= Nirvana discography =

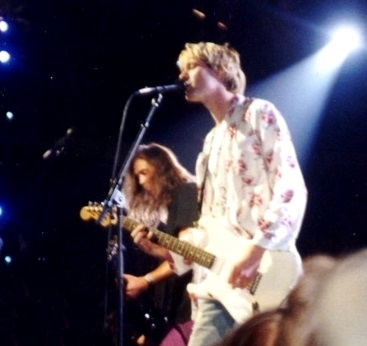
- Kurt Cobain (foreground) and Krist Novoselic at the MTV Awards in 1992
- Studio albums: 3
- Extended plays: 2
- Live albums: 5
- Compilation albums: 4
- Singles: 21
- Video albums: 7
- Music videos: 8
- Miscellaneous: 17

The discography of Nirvana, an American rock band, consists of three studio albums, twenty-one singles, five live albums, two extended plays, four compilation albums, and three box sets.

Nirvana was formed in 1987 by vocalist and guitarist Kurt Cobain and bassist Krist Novoselic, with the position of drummer being filled by various musicians. The band released its debut album, Bleach, in 1989 on independent label Sub Pop. After being joined by final drummer Dave Grohl and signing to Geffen Records subsidiary DGC Records, the band released its second studio album, Nevermind, which became one of the best selling alternative albums of the 1990s and popularized the Seattle grunge movement and alternative music. The band's third album, In Utero, was also a commercial and critical success, though it did not match the sales precedent set by Nevermind—as the members of the band expected. Nirvana disbanded in 1994 after the death of Cobain; since then several posthumous releases have been issued from the band, which once resulted in a legal conflict between Cobain's widow, Courtney Love, and the surviving members of the band over the release of the song "You Know You're Right". In 2006, Love sold a significant share of the rights to Cobain's song catalog to Primary Wave Music Publishing. Since its debut, the band has sold 27.6 million albums in the United States alone, and over 75 million records worldwide.

== Albums ==
=== Studio albums ===
Title	Album details	Chart positions										Sales	Certifications (sales thresholds)
Title	Album details	US	AUS	AUT	CAN	FIN	NLD	NZ	SWE	SWI	UK	Sales	Certifications (sales thresholds)
Bleach	Released: June 15, 1989; Label: Sub Pop (SP-34); Formats: CD, cassette (CS), LP	89	34	26	—	22	—	30	—	—	33	US: 1,900,000	RIAA: Platinum; ARIA: Platinum; BPI: Platinum; MC: Gold
Nevermind	Released: September 24, 1991; Label: DGC (24425); Formats: CD, CS, LP BD-A	1	2	2	1	1	3	2	1	2	5	US: 11,540,000; FIN: 46,830; Worldwide: 30,000,000	RIAA: 13× Platinum; ARIA: 5× Platinum; BPI: 10× Platinum; IFPI AUT: Platinum; IFPI FIN: Gold; IFPI SWE: 2× Platinum; IFPI SWI: Platinum; MC: Diamond; NVPI: Platinum; RMNZ: 7× Platinum
In Utero	Released: September 21, 1993; Labels: DGC; Formats: CD, CS, LP BD-A	1	2	8	3	6	4	3	1	16	1	US: 4,258,000; Worldwide: 15,000,000	RIAA: 6× Platinum; ARIA: 2× Platinum; BPI: 3× Platinum; IFPI AUT: Gold; IFPI SWE: Gold; MC: 6× Platinum; NVPI: Gold; RMNZ: 3× Platinum
"—" denotes releases that did not chart or were not released in that territory.

=== Live albums ===
Title	Album details	Chart positions										Sales	Certifications (sales thresholds)
Title	Album details	US	AUS	AUT	CAN	FIN	NLD	NZ	SWE	SWI	UK	Sales	Certifications (sales thresholds)
MTV Unplugged in New York	Released: November 1, 1994; Labels: DGC, Geffen (24727); Formats: CD, CS, LP	1	1	1	1	3	2	1	2	3	1	US: 5,100,000; FIN: 24,373	RIAA: 8× Platinum; ARIA: 5× Platinum; BPI: 3× Platinum; IFPI AUT: 2× Platinum; IFPI FIN: Gold; IFPI SWE: Gold; IFPI SWI: 2× Platinum; MC: 9× Platinum; NVPI: Platinum; RMNZ: 2× Platinum
From the Muddy Banks of the Wishkah	Released: October 1, 1996; Labels: DGC, Geffen (25105); Formats: CD, CS, LP	1	1	3	1	2	14	2	6	9	4	US: 1,300,000	RIAA: Platinum; ARIA: Platinum; BPI: Gold; IFPI AUT: Gold; MC: 2× Platinum
Live at Reading	Released: November 3, 2009; Label: Geffen (B0013503-02) (B0013501-00); Formats: CD, CD+DVD, 2×LP	37	—	28	17	—	64	33	—	97	32	US: 148,000	ARIA: Gold; BPI: Silver
Live at the Paramount	Released: April 5, 2019; Label: DGC; Formats: 2×LP	— (Note: Live at the Paramount did not chart on the US Billboard 200 album chart, but did chart at number 72 on the US Billboard Top Album Sales chart.)	—	—	—	—	—	—	—	—	—		
Live and Loud	Released: August 30, 2019; Label: DGC; Formats: 2×LP	— (Note: Live and Loud did not chart on the US Billboard 200 album chart, but did chart at number 47 on the US Billboard Top Album Sales chart, and at number 3 on the US Billboard Vinyl Albums chart.)	—	—	—	—	—	—	—	—	— (Note: Live and Loud did not chart on the OCC UK Albums Chart, but did chart at number 45 on the OCC UK Album Sales chart, number 38 on the OCC UK Physical Albums chart, and number 6 on the OCC UK Vinyl Albums chart.)		
"—" denotes releases that did not chart or were not released in that territory.

=== Compilation albums ===
Title	Album details	Chart positions										Sales	Certifications (sales thresholds)
Title	Album details	US	AUS	AUT	CAN	FIN	NLD	NZ	SWE	SWI	UK	Sales	Certifications (sales thresholds)
Incesticide	Released: December 14, 1992; Labels: Sub Pop, DGC (24504); Formats: CD, CS, LP	39	22	10	21	16	31	—	27	18	14	US: 1,400,000	RIAA: Platinum; ARIA: Gold; BPI: Platinum; MC: 2× Platinum
Nirvana	Released: October 29, 2002; Labels: DGC, Geffen (25105); Formats: CD, CS, LP	3	1	1	2	9	12	2	10	2	3	US: 2,400,000; FIN: 17,128	RIAA: Platinum; ARIA: 6× Platinum; BPI: 5× Platinum; IFPI AUT: Platinum; IFPI FIN: Gold; IFPI SWE: Gold; IFPI SWI: Platinum; RMNZ: 3× Platinum
Sliver: The Best of the Box	Released: November 1, 2005; Labels: DGC, Geffen (000561702), Universal (1190); Format: CD	21	95	26	—	—	—	—	—	87	56	US: 376,000	ARIA: Gold; BPI: Silver
Icon	Released: August 31, 2010; Label: Universal; Format: CD	— (Note: Icon did not chart on the US Billboard 200 album chart, but did chart at number 46 on the US Billboard Catalog Albums chart in 2017.)	—	—	—	—	—	—	—	—	—		MC: Gold
"—" denotes releases that did not chart or were not released in that territory.

== Box sets ==
Title	Album details	Chart positions										Sales	Certifications (sales thresholds)
Title	Album details	US	AUT	CAN	DEN	FRA	JPN	NLD	NZ	SWI	UK	Sales	Certifications (sales thresholds)
Singles	Released: November 6, 1995; Labels: DGC, Geffen (24901); Format: 6×CD box set	—	—	—	5	17	—	—	—	—	101		
With the Lights Out	Released: November 23, 2004; Labels: DGC, Geffen (000372700), Universal (9864838); Formats: 3×CD+DVD box set	19	34	10	—	20	16	65	39	28	56	US: 546,000	RIAA: Platinum; BPI: Silver
Nevermind: The Singles	Released: November 25, 2011; Label: Universal; Format: 4 x 10" vinyl box set	— (Note: Nevermind: The Singles did not chart on the US Billboard 200 album chart, but did chart at number 3 on the US Billboard Vinyl Albums chart.)	—	—	—	—	—	—	—	—	—		
"—" denotes releases that did not chart or were not released in that territory.

== Extended plays ==
Title	EP details	Chart positions			Comments
Title	EP details	AUS	JPN	UK Indie	Comments
Blew	Released: December 1989; Label: Tupelo; Formats: 12-inch, CD	—	—	15	Blew was intended to be released to promote an upcoming European tour, but this plan was scrapped, and the EP ended up being released exclusively in the UK shortly after its completion.
Hormoaning	Released: February 5, 1992; Labels: DGC, Geffen; Formats: 12-inch, CD, CS	2	67	—	Hormoaning was released only in Australia and Japan, with two different covers accompanying the release in each country, to promote the band's tour of the Pacific Rim. Hormoaning was re-released for Record Store Day 2011, as a limited edition.
"—" denotes releases that did not chart or were not released in that territory.

== Singles ==
=== Retail singles ===
Title	Year	Peak chart positions										Certifications	Album
Title	Year	US	AUS	BEL	FIN	FRA	IRL	NZ	PRT	SWE	UK	Certifications	Album
"Love Buzz" (Note: The "Love Buzz" single was limited to 1000 numbered retail copies and 200 promotional copies.)	1988	—	—	—	—	—	—	—	—	—	—	RIAA: Gold	Bleach
"Sliver" (Note: Though "Sliver" was initially released as a standalone single on Sub Pop in 1990, it did not chart in Ireland until after the success of the Nevermind album in 1992.)	1990	— (Note: "Sliver" did not chart on the US Billboard Hot 100 but charted at number 19 on the US Billboard Alternative Airplay chart in January 1993 following its appearance on the Incesticide compilation album which was released in December 1992.)	— (Note: "Sliver" did not chart on the Australian ARIA Singles Chart but charted at number 12 on the Australian ARIA Alternative Singles Chart.)	—	—	—	23	—	—	—	77		Non-album single
"Smells Like Teen Spirit"	1991	6	5	1	8	1	15	1	2	3	7	RIAA: Diamond; ARIA: 12× Platinum; RMNZ: 8× Platinum; IFPI SWE: Gold; BPI: 6× Platinum	Nevermind
"Come as You Are"	1992	32	25	12	8	12	7	3	8	24	9	RIAA: 5× Platinum; ARIA: 7× Platinum; SNEP: Gold; RMNZ: 6× Platinum; BPI: 3× Platinum	Nevermind
"Lithium"	1992	64	53	18	1	— (Note: "Lithium" did not chart on the French SNEP Singles Chart, but did chart at number 20 on the West Europe Airplay Chart which included France, Belgium (Wallonia), parts of Switzerland, and Monaco.)	5	28	4	— (Note: "Lithium" did not chart on the Swedish Singles Chart but did chart at number 10 on the Swedish Airplay Chart.)	11	RIAA: 3× Platinum; ARIA: 3× Platinum; RMNZ: 2× Platinum; BPI: Platinum	Nevermind
"In Bloom"	1992	— (Note: "In Bloom" did not chart on the US Billboard Hot 100 due to the lack of an American physical release, but it charted at number 5 on the US Billboard Mainstream Rock chart.)	73	—	16	—	7	20	10	30	28	RIAA: 2× Platinum; ARIA: Platinum; RMNZ: Platinum; BPI: Gold	Nevermind
"Heart-Shaped Box"	1993	— (Note: "Heart-Shaped Box" did not chart on the US Billboard Hot 100 due to the lack of an American physical release, but it charted at number 1 on the US Billboard Alternative Airplay chart, and at number 4 on the US Billboard Mainstream Rock chart.)	21	18	9	37	6	9	4	16	5	RIAA: 3× Platinum; ARIA: 3× Platinum; RMNZ: 3× Platinum; BPI: Platinum	In Utero
"All Apologies"/ "Rape Me" (Note: "All Apologies" and "Rape Me" were released together as a double A-side single.)	1993	— (Note: "All Apologies" did not chart on the Billboard Hot 100 but peaked at number 45 on the Billboard Hot 100 Airplay chart.)	58	30	—	20	20	32	— (Note: "All Apologies" / "Rape Me" did not chart on the Portuguese AFP Singles Chart, which was only a Top 10 chart at the time, but "Rape Me" did chart at number 15 on the Iberian Airplay Chart, which included Portugal and Spain.)	—	32	RIAA: Platinum / Platinum; ARIA: Platinum / Gold; RMNZ: Platinum / Gold; BPI: Gold / Silver	In Utero
"Pennyroyal Tea"	1994	— (Note: The "Pennyroyal Tea" single was cancelled after the death of Kurt Cobain in 1994, but it charted at number 1 on the Billboard Hot Singles Sales chart, when re-released for Record Store Day in 2014.)	—	—	—	—	—	—	—	—	121 (Note: The "Pennyroyal Tea" single was cancelled after the death of Kurt Cobain in 1994, but it charted at number 4 on the UK Physical Singles Sales chart, and number 121 on the UK Singles Chart, when re-released for Record Store Day in 2014.)	ARIA: Gold	In Utero
"About a Girl" (Note: The "About a Girl" retail single was released only in Continental Europe and Australia, but the song was released to radio in the US.)	1994	— (Note: "About a Girl" did not chart on the Billboard Hot 100 but peaked at number 22 on the Billboard Hot 100 Airplay chart.)	4	12	8	23	—	—	— (Note: "About a Girl" did not chart on the Portuguese AFP Singles Chart, which had been discontinued in January 1994, but did chart at number 7 on the Iberian Airplay Chart, which included Portugal and Spain.)	20	185 (Note: The "About a Girl" single charted in the UK based solely on import sales and did not receive a UK release.)	ARIA: Platinum; BPI: Platinum; RMNZ: 2× Platinum	MTV Unplugged in New York
"You Know You're Right" (Note: "You Know You're Right" was released as a promotional and downloadable single only at a time when there were no countries in the world including downloads in their music charts.)	2002	45	—	—	—	—	—	—	—	—	— (Note: "You Know You're Right" did not chart on the UK Singles Chart because it was only released as a downloadable single and no physical single was released at a time when downloads were not being counted towards the UK Singles Chart, but it charted at number 85 on the UK Airplay Chart.)	RIAA: Gold; ARIA: Gold; RMNZ: Gold	Nirvana
"—" denotes releases that did not chart or were not released in that territory.

=== Promotional singles ===
Title	Year	Peak chart positions										Certifications	Album
Title	Year	US Air	US Main	US Alt	BEL	CAN	EU Air	FRA Air	ICE	SPN Air	UK Rock	Certifications	Album
"On a Plain" (Note: Released only in the United States.)	1991	—	—	25	—	—	—	—	—	—	—	ARIA: Gold	Nevermind
"Molly's Lips" (Note: Released only in Brazil.)	1992	—	—	—	—	—	—	—	—	—	—		Incesticide
"All Apologies"	1994	45	—	—	—	—	—	—	—	16	—	RIAA: Gold; BPI: Silver	MTV Unplugged in New York
"Polly"	1994	—	—	—	—	—	—	—	—	—	—	RIAA: Gold; ARIA: Platinum; BPI: Silver	MTV Unplugged in New York
"The Man Who Sold the World"	1995	39	12	6	24	22	29	5	2	2	13	ARIA: 2× Platinum; RMNZ: Platinum; BPI: Platinum; PROMUSICAE: Gold	MTV Unplugged in New York
"Where Did You Sleep Last Night"	1995	—	—	—	—	—	—	—	3	—	—	ARIA: Platinum; BPI: Silver; RMNZ: Gold	MTV Unplugged in New York
"Lake of Fire"	1995	—	22	—	—	—	—	—	—	—	—	ARIA: Gold; RMNZ: Platinum	MTV Unplugged in New York
"Aneurysm"	1996	63	11	13	—	49	—	—	—	—	—		From the Muddy Banks of the Wishkah
"Drain You"	1996	—	—	— (Note: "Drain You" did not chart on the Billboard US Alternative Airplay chart but did chart at number 44 on the US Alternative Top 50 chart which was published by Radio & Records.)	—	—	—	—	—	—	—	RIAA: Gold; ARIA: Gold; RMNZ: Gold; BPI: Silver	From the Muddy Banks of the Wishkah
"Endless, Nameless" (Note: In 2021, "Endless, Nameless" was released as a 7-inch single included with the 30th-anniversary vinyl reissue of Nevermind.)	2021	—	—	—	—	—	—	—	—	—	—		Nevermind
"—" denotes releases that did not chart or were not released in that territory.

=== Split singles ===
Title	Year	Other artist	Peak positions			
Title	Year	Other artist	US Retail	AUS Alt	EU	UK
"Candy" / "Molly's Lips"	1991	The Fluid	64	—	—	—
"Here She Comes Now" / "Venus in Furs"	1991	Melvins	—	—	—	—
"Puss" / "Oh, the Guilt"	1993	The Jesus Lizard	10	3	36	12
"About a Girl" / "Blind Man" (Note: Released only in Mexico as a promotional single and in Italy as a jukebox 7" single limited to 500 copies.)	1994	Aerosmith	—	—	—	—
"The Man Who Sold the World" / "Walk on Water" (Note: Released only in Italy as a jukebox 7" single limited to 500 copies.)	1995	Aerosmith	—	—	—	—
"—" denotes releases that did not chart or were not released in that territory.

== Other charted and certified songs ==
Song	Year	Peak positions										Certifications	Album
Song	Year	US	AUS	CAN	GRE	HUN	IRE	LTU	NZ	UK	WW	Certifications	Album
"Been a Son"	1989	—	—	—	—	—	—	—	—	—	—	IFPI DEN: Platinum	Blew
"Breed"	1991	—	—	—	—	—	—	—	—	—	—	RIAA: Gold; ARIA: Gold; BPI: Silver; RMNZ: Gold	Nevermind
"Lounge Act"	1991	—	—	—	—	—	—	—	—	—	—	ARIA: Gold	Nevermind
"Something in the Way"	1991	46	22	34	8	25	47	34	40	76	23	RIAA: Platinum; ARIA: 2× Platinum; MC: Platinum; RMNZ: Platinum; BPI: Gold	Nevermind
"Dumb"	1993	— (Note: "Dumb" did not chart on the Billboard US Hot 100 singles chart but did chart at number 37 on the US Alternative National Airplay chart which was published by Radio & Records.)	—	—	—	—	—	—	—	— (Note: "Dumb" did not chart on the UK singles chart but did chart at number 92 on the UK airplay chart in October 1993 which was compiled by ERA.)	—	RIAA: Gold; ARIA: Platinum; RMNZ: Platinum; BPI: Silver	In Utero
"—" denotes releases that did not chart or were not released in that territory.

== Music videos ==
List of music videos, showing year released and director
Title	Year	Director(s)	Album
"In Bloom" (Sub Pop version)	1990	Steve Brown	Sub Pop Video Network Program 1
"Smells Like Teen Spirit"	1991	Samuel Bayer	Nevermind
"Come as You Are"	1992	Kevin Kerslake	Nevermind
"Lithium"	1992	Kevin Kerslake	Nevermind
"In Bloom"	1992	Kevin Kerslake	Nevermind
"Sliver"	1993	Kevin Kerslake	Incesticide
"Heart-Shaped Box"	1993	Anton Corbijn	In Utero
"You Know You're Right"	2002	Chris Hafner	Nirvana
"Dumb"	2023	RuffMercy	In Utero

== Video albums ==
Title	Video album details	Chart positions			Certifications
Title	Video album details	US	AUS	UK	Certifications
Live! Tonight! Sold Out!!	Released: November 15, 1994; Format: VHS, Laserdisc; Released: November 7, 2006; Format: DVD; Label: Geffen	1	1	2	RIAA: 3× Platinum; ARIA: Platinum; BPI: 2× Platinum
With the Lights Out	Released: November 23, 2004; Labels: DGC, Geffen (000372700), Universal (9864838); Formats: 3×CD+DVD box set	3	N/A	N/A	RIAA: Platinum
Classic Albums: Nirvana – Nevermind	Released: March 22, 2005; Label: Eagle Rock Entertainment; Format: DVD	4	13	6	RIAA: Platinum; ARIA: Platinum
MTV Unplugged in New York	Released: November 20, 2007; Label: DGC; Format: DVD	6	3	3	RIAA: 7× Platinum; ARIA: Platinum; BPI: Platinum
Live at Reading	Released: November 2, 2009; Label: DGC; Format: DVD	1	4	— (Note: The bootleg release, Nirvana - At Reading Festival, peaked at number 30 on the UK Music Video chart in 2008.)	ARIA: Platinum
Live at the Paramount	Released: September 27, 2011; Label: DGC; Format: DVD, Blu-ray	1	1	4	ARIA: Gold
Live and Loud	Released: September 24, 2013; Label: DGC; Format: DVD	1	2	7	
"—" denotes releases that did not chart or were not released in that territory.

== Other appearances ==
Song	Year	Album	US	Comments
"Spank Thru"	1988	Sub Pop 200	—	A re-recording of a song first performed on the 1985 Illiteracy Will Prevail demo by members of Nirvana as Fecal Matter.
"Mexican Seafood"	1989	Teriyaki Asthma, Vol. 1	—	Later released on Incesticide.
"Do You Love Me?"	1990	Hard to Believe: Kiss Covers Compilation	—	Cover of a 1976 Kiss song.
"Here She Comes Now"	1990	Heaven & Hell: A Tribute to The Velvet Underground	—	Cover of a 1968 Velvet Underground song. Previously released on the split single "Here She Comes Now/Venus in Furs" in 1991, it was later released on With the Lights Out in 2004 and on the Nevermind 20th anniversary deluxe editions in 2011.
"Beeswax"	1991	Kill Rock Stars	—	Later released on Incesticide.
"Dive"	1991	The Grunge Years	—	Later released on Incesticide.
"Return of the Rat"	1993	Eight Songs for Greg Sage and The Wipers	—	Cover of a 1979 Wipers song. Later released on With the Lights Out.
"Sappy"	1993	No Alternative	56	Nirvana's contribution to the Red Hot AIDS Benefit Series was an uncredited and a secret track. The song was originally titled "Sappy", but was renamed "Verse, Chorus, Verse" prior to release on No Alternative. It charted at number 9 on the US Alternative Airplay chart which was published by Radio & Records in 1994. It was later released on With the Lights Out in 2004 as "Sappy" and on the In Utero 20th and 30th anniversary deluxe editions as "Sappy" in 2013 and 2023.
"I Hate Myself and Want to Die"	1993	The Beavis and Butt-head Experience	5	The first song on The Beavis and Butt-Head Experience, it was recorded during the sessions for In Utero. This version of "I Hate Myself and Want to Die" was included as a B-side on the cancelled "Pennyroyal Tea" single but is different from the version found on With the Lights Out.
"Pay to Play"	1994	DGC Rarities Vol. 1	139	This is an early version of "Stay Away" which was a song on Nevermind. "Pay to Play" was the first new Nirvana song to be released after Cobain's death but its inclusion on the compilation album had been agreed to before he died. "Pay to Play" was later released on With the Lights Out in 2004 and on the Nevermind 20th anniversary deluxe editions in 2011.
"Radio Friendly Unit Shifter"	1996	Home Alive: The Art of Self Defense	—	Live version from a Grenoble, France concert in 1994. It received some airplay on alternative and active rock radio.
"Rape Me"	1999	Saturday Night Live: The Musical Performances Vol. 2	—	Live version from an appearance on Saturday Night Live. It was also released as a music video on MTV.

== Unreleased songs ==
Courtney Love stated in May 2002 that she owned 109 unreleased tapes made by Cobain, with or without the other members of Nirvana. Of these songs, many were released on the 61 song box set With the Lights Out in 2004, with three "freshly unearthed" songs appearing on the compilation Sliver: The Best of the Box in 2005. More unreleased Nirvana tracks were released on the deluxe and super deluxe 20th anniversary editions of the Nevermind and In Utero albums in 2011 and 2013 respectively. Many more unreleased songs were released on Montage of Heck: The Home Recordings in 2015 which was the companion soundtrack to the film Kurt Cobain: Montage of Heck. Brett Morgen stated that in Cobain's archive he discovered over 200 hours of audio on over 108 cassettes and that he thought the solo album "would be a nice complement to the film".

== See also ==
- Nirvana bootleg recordings
- Foo Fighters discography
