= Newermind =

Compilation album (tribute album) by Various artists
- Released: July 19, 2011
- Genre: Alternative rock, indie rock
- Label: SPIN Magazine

Newermind: A Tribute to Nirvana is a 2011 celebratory tribute album, created by SPIN Magazine, for the 20th anniversary of Nirvana's album Nevermind. The bands that covered each song on the album were inspired by Nirvana to pursue a musical career, with special mentions to Meat Puppets and The Vaselines who had inspired Kurt Cobain. The album was originally released for free download on July 19, 2011. It is no longer available for download on the original website.

== Track listing ==
Newermind
No.	Title	Length
1.	"Smells Like Teen Spirit" (Performed by Meat Puppets)	4:54
2.	"In Bloom" (Performed by Butch Walker)	3:25
3.	"Come as You Are" (Performed by Midnight Juggernauts)	3:48
4.	"Breed" (Performed by Titus Andronicus)	2:59
5.	"Lithium" (Performed by The Vaselines)	3:59
6.	"Polly" (Performed by Amanda Palmer)	3:32
7.	"Territorial Pissings" (Performed by Surfer Blood)	2:18
8.	"Drain You" (Performed by Foxy Shazam)	4:04
9.	"Lounge Act" (Performed by Jessica Lea Mayfield)	3:05
10.	"Stay Away" (Performed by Charles Bradley and the Menahan Street Band)	3:14
11.	"On A Plain" (Performed by Wavves)	3:07
12.	"Something In The Way" (Performed by JEFF the Brotherhood)	4:12
13.	"Endless, Nameless" (Performed by EMA)	5:24
