= On a Plain =

1991 promotional single by Nirvana

- Promo CD from Nirvana's Nevermind album

Promotional single by Nirvana

from the album Nevermind
- Released: 1991
- Recorded: May 1991
- Studio: Sound City (Van Nuys, California)
- Genre: Pop-punk
- Length: 3:16
- Label: DGC
- Songwriter: Kurt Cobain (Note: On the original release of Nevermind, the lyrics were credited to Cobain while the music was credited to the whole band. Later releases credit this song solely to Cobain.)
- Producers: Butch Vig; Nirvana

Nirvana singles chronology
| "Smells Like Teen Spirit" (1991) | "On a Plain" (1991) | "Come as You Are" (1992) |

Nevermind track listing
- 13 tracks: 1. "Smells Like Teen Spirit"; 2. "In Bloom"; 3. "Come as You Are"; 4. "Breed"; 5. "Lithium"; 6. "Polly"; 7. "Territorial Pissings"; 8. "Drain You"; 9. "Lounge Act"; 10. "Stay Away"; 11. "On a Plain"; 12. "Something in the Way"; 13. "Endless, Nameless"

"On a Plain" is a song by American rock band Nirvana, written by vocalist and guitarist, Kurt Cobain. It is the 11th track on their second album, Nevermind, released in September 1991.

The song was released as a promotional single in 1992, peaking at number 25 on Billboard Alternative Songs chart.

== Early history ==
Written in 1990, "On a Plain" was first recorded in the studio in 1991, at Music Source Studios in Seattle, Washington, by the band's audio engineer, Craig Montgomery. The private session, the band's first with drummer Dave Grohl, led to the versions of "Even in His Youth" and "Aneurysm" that were released as B-sides on the "Smells Like Teen Spirit" single in September 1991. However, the other five songs recorded during the session all featured unfinished lyrics and scratch vocals, such as "On a Plain," or were instrumental.

== Nevermind ==
The song was re-recorded for the band's second album, Nevermind, by Butch Vig in May 1991 at Sound City Studios in Van Nuys, California. Vig later called it "a great pop song," remembering it as "a really new one" that "took a few takes" to complete. The final lyrics were written at Sound City shortly before the vocals were recorded, which led to the line, "What the hell am I trying to say?"

The recording features wordless backing vocals by Grohl. Vig had wanted to end the recording with Grohl's harmonies repeated four times a capella, and originally mixed the song that way, but upon hearing the mix, Cobain decided the song should end after only one pass of the harmonies. Cobain's lead vocals were done in one take.

"On a Plain" was debuted live on May 29, 1991, at Jabberjaw in Los Angeles, California, the show at which Nirvana also debuted the future Nevermind single, "Come As You Are", before "an astonished audience," according to author Charles R. Cross. The show was Nirvana's first since completing work on Nevermind.

Cobain ultimately expressed dissatisfaction with the Nevermind recording, telling Flipside, "That song came out way too clean. I'm not happy with the way that came out at all. It should have been a lot rawer; we play it a lot better live I think."

"On a Plain" was released as a promo single in the summer of 1992, and became a moderate hit.

== Post-Nevermind ==
"On a Plain" was performed during Nirvana's MTV Unplugged appearance at Sony Music Studios in New York City on November 18, 1993. This version featured Pat Smear on second guitar and Lori Goldston on cello.

The song was performed for the final time live at Nirvana's last concert, at Terminal Eins in Munich, Germany on March 1, 1994.

== Composition and lyrics ==
=== Music ===
"On a Plain" was recorded in the key of D major, with Cobain's guitar tuned to drop D. The song starts with a noise intro played by Cobain, with an audible handclap. After a short pause the main riff comes in with the power chords D5-G5-F5-E5-F5-E5-D5 played twice then followed by the power chords D5-C5-B5-A5 followed by the first progression again. The chord progressions are played twice for all verses followed by the power chords D5-Gsus2-Bbsus2 for all choruses. After the second chorus a bridge is played with the power chords F5-E5-A5-G5. The song then goes onto the third verse followed by a final chorus which is treated as the outro with the words, "I'm on a plain/I can't complain" being repeated multiple times until all instruments and main vocals start fading out until the last thing that's heard is the repeating, wordless vocal harmony from the chorus.

"On A Plain"
A 15-second sample of Cobain singing the song's third verse. Described as his "most meta moment," the song was written about writing a song and touches on writer's block.

=== Lyrics ===
In a July 1993 interview in New York City, Cobain told English journalist Jon Savage that "On a Plain" was about "classic alienation, I guess," although he then noted he had to change his explanation every time he was asked about the meaning to his songs, saying that his lyrics were largely taken from "pieces of poetry thrown together," and that his poetry was "not usually thematic at all."

The lyric "Don't quote me on that" was a reference to a recurring joke at Sound City around the time it was written. As Grohl explained to biographer Michael Azerrad, "Someone would say something like, 'Where's the mayonnaise?' And someone else would answer, 'It's in the fridge, but don't quote me on that.'"

In his 1993 book Come As You Are: The Story of Nirvana, Azerrad wrote that the lyric "My mother died every night" was a reference to an abusive relationship Cobain's mother was in while Cobain was a teenager. Azerrad also suggested that the "black sheep" in the song was a reference to Cobain himself.

The lyric "One more special message to go" referred to the fact that "On a Plain" was the last song on Nevermind that Cobain had to complete lyrics for.

Emily Parker of NME described "On a Plain" as "Kurt's most meta moment: a song written about writing a song."

== Reception ==
In her review of Nevermind for Spin, Lauren Spencer cited the "beautifully harmonic" "On a Plain" as one of the songs "you be humming...for the rest of your life."

=== Legacy ===
"On a Plain" was listed at number 26 on Rolling Stone's 2015 ranking of 102 Nirvana songs.

In 2017, to mark what would have been Kurt Cobain's 50th birthday, the Phonographic Performance Limited released a list of the top 20 most played Nirvana songs on the TV and radio in the United Kingdom in which "On a Plain" was ranked at number 10.

== Live promotional versions ==
=== Nakano Sunplaza version ===
A live version, recorded at the Nakano Sunplaza in Tokyo, Japan on February 19, 1992, was released as a streaming single in November 2021, to promote the release of the 30th anniversary reissue of Nevermind. The full Nakano Sunplaza performance appeared on the "Super Deluxe" versions of this release.

=== Reading 1992 version ===
Another live version, recorded during the band's headlining appearance at the 1992 Reading Festival in Reading, England on August 30, 1992, was released as a promotional single in 2009, to promote the release of the live CD and DVD Live at Reading, released in November 2009. The single was released in the United Kingdom on CD-R.

== Personnel ==
Personnel adapted from Nevermind liner notes

- Kurt Cobain – guitar, vocals
- Dave Grohl – drums, backing vocals
- Krist Novoselic – bass

== Charts ==
| Chart (1992) | Peak position |
|---|---|
| US Alternative Airplay (Billboard) | 25 |

== Certifications ==
Sales certifications for "On a Plain"
| Region | Certification | Certified units/sales |
|---|---|---|
| Australia (ARIA) | Gold | 35,000^{‡} |
^{‡} Sales+streaming figures based on certification alone.

== Other releases ==
- A boombox-recorded, full-band demo version, recorded in the spring of 1991 at a barn in Tacoma, Washington the band had converted to a rehearsal space, appeared on disc two of the 20th anniversary "Deluxe" and "Super Deluxe" versions of Nevermind, released in September 2011.
- Video of another full-band demo version, recorded during the same period and at the same location, was released as after-credits bonus material on the DVD release of Live! Tonight! Sold Out!! in November 2006.
- An early "Devonshire" mix of the Nevermind version was released on the 20th anniversary "Super Deluxe" version of the album.
- A live version, recorded at the Paramount Theatre in Seattle on October 31, 1991, appeared on the live video, Live at the Paramount, released on DVD and Blu-ray in September 2011.
- Another live version, recorded at the Paradiso in Amsterdam, the Netherlands on November 25, 1991, appeared on the bonus disc included with the DVD release of Live! Tonight!! Sold Out!! The full concert was released on CD and Blu-ray on the 30th anniversary "Deluxe" and "Super Deluxe" versions of Nevermind in November 2021.
- The 30th anniversary "Super Deluxe" version of Nevermind also featured the band's full performance at The Palace in Melbourne, Australia on February 2, 1992, which featured a version of "On a Plain".
- A live version, from the band's appearance at the Roskilde Festival in Roskilde, Denmark on June 26, 1992, appeared on Live! Tonight! Sold Out!!, released in November 1994.
- The MTV Unplugged version of the song appeared on the live album MTV Unplugged in New York, which featured the full show, in November 1994. The performance was released on DVD in November 2007, which featured both an unedited version of the performance and the original MTV broadcast, which was first broadcast in December 1993.
- Two live versions of "On a Plain," from the band's concerts at the Great Western Forum in Inglewood, California on December 30, 1993, and at the Seattle Center Arena in Seattle on January 7, 1994, appear on the 30th anniversary "Super Deluxe" reissue of Nirvana's final studio album, In Utero, released in October 2023.

=== Unreleased versions ===
- The studio version recorded at Music Source in Seattle on January 1, 1991, remains unreleased.
