= Classic Albums: Nirvana – Nevermind =

Video by Nirvana
- Released: March 22, 2005
- Genre: Grunge
- Length: 74:00
- Label: Eagle Vision
- Producers: Terry Shand and Geoff Kempin, Executive Producer Jamie Rugge-Price, Series Producers Nick de Grunwald & Martin R. Smith

Nirvana chronology
Live! Tonight! Sold Out!! (1994)	Classic Albums: Nirvana – Nevermind (2005)	MTV Unplugged in New York (2007)

Classic Albums: Nirvana – Nevermind is a documentary DVD released by Eagle Vision in March 2005, as part of the Classic Albums series. It features interviews specifically for this release with Nirvana band members Dave Grohl and Krist Novoselic, as well as Nevermind album producer Butch Vig about the recording of the album. Other interview highlights include Garry Gersh (A&R DGC Records), Jonathan Ponneman and Nils Bernstein (Sub Pop Records), Thurston Moore (Sonic Youth) and Jack Endino.

== Reception ==
A review in Billboard magazine said that surviving Nirvana members, bassist Krist Novoselic and drummer Dave Grohl, "offer much insight into their old band and the recording of its breakthrough second album" and that the film "gets into the heart of the story with Grohl, Novoselic and producer Butch Vig detailing the Nevermind sessions, track by track". Billboard also noted that the deceased Nirvana band leader, Kurt Cobain, only appears briefly in interview footage but it gives a strong sense of him in what may have been the happiest time of his life.

== DVD features ==
=== Track listing (featuring excerpts from and the making of) ===
1. "Smells Like Teen Spirit"
2. "In Bloom"
3. "Come as You Are"
4. "Breed"
5. "Lithium"
6. "Polly"
7. "Territorial Pissings"
8. "Drain You"
9. "Lounge Act"
10. "Stay Away"
11. "On a Plain"
12. "Something in the Way"

=== Special feature information ===
- Drain You [the story behind the making of the track]
- Dave Grohl Joins Nirvana
- Going to Record in LA
- Making of the 'Smells Like Teen Spirit' Video
- 'Polly' [live in concert]
- Nevermind: The Album Sleeve

== Charts ==
Chart (2005–2006)	Peak position
German Albums (Offizielle Top 100)	91
Italian Music DVD (FIMI)	14
Norwegian DVDs (VG-lista)	3
UK Music Videos (Official Charts)	6
US Top Music Video Sales (Billboard)	4

== Certifications ==
Region	Certification	Certified units/sales
Australia (ARIA)	Platinum	15,000^{^}
New Zealand (RMNZ)	Gold	2,500^{^}
United States (RIAA)	Platinum	100,000^{^}
^{^} Shipments figures based on certification alone.

== See also ==
- Nevermind It's an Interview
- Nirvana discography
