= Live at the Paramount (video) =

Video by Nirvana
- Released: September 24, 2011
- Recorded: October 31, 1991
- Venues: Paramount Theatre, Seattle, Washington
- Genres: Grunge; alternative rock
- Length: 70:44
- Label: DGC

Nirvana chronology
Live at Reading (2009)	Live at the Paramount (2011)	Live and Loud (2013)

Live at the Paramount is a live video and album by American rock band Nirvana, released on September 24, 2011. It was released on DVD and Blu-ray Disc as part of the 20th anniversary of the band's second album and mainstream breakthrough, Nevermind.

It features the band's live performance at the Paramount Theatre in Seattle, Washington, on October 31, 1991. Recorded five weeks after the release of Nevermind, the footage is taken from the only Nirvana show to be shot entirely on 16 mm film, a higher quality recording than video tape. The Blu-ray features uncompressed 48 kHz/24-bit sound. On September 19, 2025, it was made available by ARTE Concert on YouTube.

As well as the standalone DVD and Blu-ray releases, a DVD along with a CD audio version of the show are available packaged together as part of the limited edition Super Deluxe box set reissue of the Nevermind album. The concert was released for the first time on vinyl in April 2019.

== Background ==
Nirvana's Paramount performance was the third of three shows in the Pacific Northwest with fellow Seattle band Mudhoney, and the final show of the North American leg of their Nevermind tour before the band departed for Europe. The three concerts, which also featured shows in Portland, Oregon and Vancouver, British Columbia, had been booked two months earlier and were originally to feature Mudhoney as the headliners. However, the surprising success of the band's second album, Nevermind, which had been released the previous month, led to Nirvana being moved to the headlining spot. The Seattle show, which also featured American rock band Bikini Kill on the bill, also had to be moved from the smaller Moore Theatre to the Paramount due to the demand for tickets.

The Paramount show was attended by approximately 2,800 people, making it the largest audience the band played to during the first part of the Nevermind tour. Tickets to the show were $10.

=== The performance ===
Nirvana's Paramount performance featured a typical set list of the time, with material from Nevermind and the band's 1989 debut album Bleach, as well as set list regulars "Aneurysm", "Been a Son" and the 1990 single, "Sliver". The show also featured a cover of "Jesus Wants Me for a Sunbeam" by Scottish rock band the Vaselines, and an early version of "Rape Me", which Cobain wrote while Nevermind was being mixed. It was filmed using 16 mm film, which is why it was able to be released in high definition on Blu-ray.

The show was filmed by a video crew the band's co-manager, John Silva, had hired for $250,000. Cobain had invited Ian Dickson and Nikki McClure, two friends of his from Olympia, Washington, to dance onstage, and they wore shirts that read "Girl" and "Boy", respectively.

English music journalist Everett True, a friend of Cobain's, described the Paramount show as "the end of an era" that showed that "incontrovertibly, Nirvana was now big news". Seattle photographer Charles Peterson, acclaimed for his role in documenting the rise of the city's grunge scene, recalled that "the record label, unbeknownst to Nirvana, had set up a big film shoot. There were six guys all clad in black running around with compact 35mm movie cameras and I was like, 'This is the beginning of the end.' It was so unfair to their home audience because it stilted the performance. It reeked of money."

=== Previously released songs ===
The idea of releasing the Paramount show in its entirety dates back to the band's lifetime. In his 1993 Nirvana biography Come As You Are: The Story of Nirvana, Michael Azerrad wrote that the show "may one day be edited into a full-length film." By the time of Cobain's death in April 1994, several songs from the soundboard recording, mixed by Andy Wallace, had been officially released. "School" and "Drain You" appeared on the second single from Nevermind, for the song "Come As You Are", in March 1992. "Been a Son" appeared on the following single, for "Lithium", in July 1992. Footage from the performance appeared in the music video for "Lithium" directed by Kevin Kerslake.

In November 1994, the Paramount versions of "About a Girl", "Breed", "Polly" and "Endless, Nameless" appeared in the home video Live! Tonight! Sold Out!!, which had been compiled by Cobain but unfinished at the time of his death. In October 1996, the Paramount version of "Negative Creep", from Wallace's mix, was released on the live compilation album From the Muddy Banks of the Wishkah, compiled primarily by bassist Krist Novoselic. The video of "Jesus Doesn't Want Me for a Sunbeam" was released on the DVD of the band's rarities box set, With the Lights Out, in November 2004, while the video of "Polly" was re-released as a bonus feature on the Classic Albums: Nirvana – Nevermind DVD in March 2005.

The full soundboard of the Wallace mix had been available in trading circles for years before the release of Live at the Paramount, but remains unreleased.

== Reception ==
Jayson Greene of Pitchfork wrote that "the joy of Live at the Paramount is hearing the charge of this moment: a great band newly famous, still reeling and flooded with nervy adrenaline." Mark Deming of AllMusic compared the release to the 1964 film A Hard Day's Night in that they "captured the artists at a moment where success was a pleasure, just before it became a burden."

Reviewing the vinyl release in 2019, Kerrang!'s Nick Ruskell wrote that the concert "doesn't even sound like the best show Nirvana ever played. But that's what makes this special – a truly spectacular band captured without hype, in the moment, just doing what they do. And for a band so steeped in legend, that is a rare thing to have.

The Blu-ray version has been widely criticized for having audio sync problems. Amazon has posted a statement from Universal that denies the problem exists, but the review at the website Blu-ray.com gives the audio a score of 0/5 because of the sync issues.

Later prints of the blu-ray disc (2012+) fixed the sync issues.

== Legacy ==
On December 12, 2021, Live at the Paramount was screened at the Paramount Theatre by Seattle Theatre Group, the nonprofit group in charge of venue. The screening featured opening live music by Seattle rock bands Them and the Black Tones, with the latter band's set mixed by Nirvana's sound engineer, Craig Montgomery.

== Track listing ==
All songs by Kurt Cobain unless noted.

1. "Jesus Doesn't Want Me for a Sunbeam" (The Vaselines cover) (Eugene Kelly, Frances McKee)- 5:48
2. "Aneurysm" (Cobain, Dave Grohl, Krist Novoselic)- 5:05
3. "Drain You" - 5:16
4. "School" - 2:57
5. "Floyd the Barber" - 2:21
6. "Smells Like Teen Spirit" (Cobain, Grohl, Novoselic)- 6:58
7. "About a Girl" - 3:02
8. "Polly" - 3:04
9. "Breed" - 2:54
10. "Sliver" (Cobain, Novoselic)- 2:18
11. "Love Buzz" (Shocking Blue cover) (Robbie van Leeuwen)- 4:01
12. "Lithium" - 6:02
13. "Been a Son" - 2:41
14. "Negative Creep" - 3:00
15. "On a Plain" - 4:09
16. "Blew" - 3:00

=== Encore ===
1. "Rape Me" (Early version) - 3:04
2. "Territorial Pissings" (intro from the song "Get Together", spoken by Krist Novoselic) - 2:55 (Cobain, Chet Powers (uncredited))
3. "Endless, Nameless" - 7:39 (Cobain, Grohl, Novoselic)

== Bonus features ==
=== Easter Eggs ===
All video releases, the stand-alone DVD, Blu-ray, and the DVD that comes with the Nevermind "Super Deluxe" boxset, feature the following hidden tracks (easter eggs) from March 8, 1991, at the Commodore Ballroom in Vancouver, British Columbia.

1. "Territorial Pissings"
2. "Breed"

=== Nevermind Super Deluxe DVD ===
The DVD that comes with the limited edition Nevermind "Super Deluxe" boxset features the music videos for the four singles from the Nevermind album. However these are not included with the standalone DVD or Blu-ray release.

1. "Smells Like Teen Spirit"
2. "Come as You Are"
3. "Lithium"
4. "In Bloom"

== Charts ==
Chart (2011)	Peak position
Australian DVD Chart (ARIA Charts)	1
Italian Music DVD (FIMI)	7
Dutch DVD Chart (MegaCharts)	4
Portuguese DVD Chart (AFP)	5
Swedish DVD Chart (Sverigetopplistan)	6
Swiss Music DVD Chart (Schweizer Hitparade)	4
UK Music Videos (Official Charts)	4
US Top Music Video Sales (Billboard)	1

== Certifications ==
Region	Certification	Certified units/sales
Australia (ARIA)	Gold	7,500^{^}
^{^} Shipments figures based on certification alone.

== 2019 vinyl release ==
The concert was released as a double LP vinyl set on April 12, 2019, which came with a 12x24" poster and a replica of the VIP pass that was used on the night as a download card.

=== Track listing ===
Side A

1. Jesus Doesn't Want Me for a Sunbeam
2. Aneurysm
3. Drain You
4. School
5. Floyd the Barber

Side B

1. Smells Like Teen Spirit
2. About a Girl
3. Polly
4. Breed
5. Sliver

Side C

1. Love Buzz
2. Lithium
3. Been a Son
4. Negative Creep
5. On a Plain

Side D

1. Blew
2. Rape Me
3. Territorial Pissings
4. Endless, Nameless

=== Charts ===
Chart (2019)	Peak position
Belgian Albums (Ultratop Flanders)	70
Belgian Albums (Ultratop Wallonia)	107
German Albums (Offizielle Top 100)	99
UK Rock & Metal Albums (Official Charts)	16
US Top Album Sales (Billboard)	72
US Rock Album Sales (Billboard)	28
US Alternative Album Sales (Billboard)	14

== Personnel ==
- Kurt Cobain – lead vocals, guitar
- Krist Novoselic – bass guitar, intro vocals on "Territorial Pissings"
- Dave Grohl – drums, backing vocals
