= Nirvana – A Classic Album Under Review – In Utero =

- Produced by: Thomas Walker
- Starring: Nirvana
- Music by: Nirvana
- Release date: November 21, 2006

Nirvana – A Classic Album Under Review – In Utero

Video by Nirvana
- Released: November 21, 2006
- Label: MVD
- Producer: Thomas Walker

Nirvana – A Classic Album Under Review – In Utero (also known as Nirvana's In Utero) is a 2006 music documentary released exclusively to DVD dealing with grunge band Nirvana's third studio album, In Utero. The film purports to offer a "rare insight" into the influential music group, and consists of live and studio performances by Nirvana, interspersed with interviews with the band and with music industry notables and experts. It was released on November 21, 2006, and has a running time of 70 minutes.

The film is narrated by Tony Ponfret and produced by Thomas Walker. Those interviewed include Nirvana's original drummer Chad Channing, Kurt Cobain's biographer Charles R. Cross, and music producer Jack Endino. The DVD also include biographies of the contributors, an interactive Nirvana quiz, and a two-minute bonus discussion of the Unplugged in New York album.

The DVD received generally negative reviews. PopMatters.com said, "That the album warrants a focused discussion on its creation and impact, both at the time and ongoing, is without debate," but felt that it was "surprising and disappointing" that the collected critics and writers found "so little new to say about the band and their work". It was criticized for its poor choice in people interviewed (mainly British musicians and journalists with little connection to Nirvana).

Record Collector Magazine also felt that "In Utero’s legacy as Kurt Cobain’s final work" represented "an ideal topic for a classic album study", but complained that "as the album edges into more abrasive territory with Milk It and Tourettes, the review glosses over them abruptly", and said that the DVD was "essentially only of Biography Channel standard".

Chris Akin of Blogcritics.com was more appreciative and said that the documentary "paints [the] picture of Nirvana's historic rise and tragic fall with a clarity and lack of bias that most of the others can't seem to muster."

== See also ==
- In Utero
- Nirvana discography
