= From the Muddy Banks of the Wishkah =

Live album by Nirvana
- Released: October 1, 1996
- Recorded: 1989, 1991–1994
- Genres: Grunge; alternative rock
- Length: 53:55
- Label: DGC
- Producers: Shauna O' Brien, Diane Stata

Nirvana chronology
Singles (1995)	From the Muddy Banks of the Wishkah (1996)	Nirvana (2002)

From the Muddy Banks of the Wishkah is a live album by American rock band Nirvana, released on October 1, 1996 by DGC Records. It features live performances recorded from 1989 to 1994.

Compiled largely by bassist Krist Novoselic, it was released two years after the multi-platinum-selling live album, MTV Unplugged in New York, which was the first Nirvana album to be released after the suicide of the band's songwriter, singer and guitarist, Kurt Cobain, in April 1994. From the Muddy Banks of the Wishkah was intended to show the band's heavier side, in contrast to the acoustic MTV Unplugged album, and was originally meant to be packaged alongside the MTV Unplugged set in a double album called Verse Chorus Verse. However, most of what became From the Muddy Banks of the Wishkah was eventually recompiled.

The album debuted at number one on the Billboard 200, selling nearly 159,000 copies in its first week of release. It spent 25 weeks on the chart and became the band's sixth platinum album in the US since 1991. The album's first promotional single, for the song "Aneurysm", reached number 11 on the Billboard Mainstream Rock Tracks chart and number 13 on its Modern Rock Tracks chart, while its music video topped the charts on Much Music in Canada. A second promotional single, for the song "Drain You", charted briefly as well.

From the Muddy Banks of the Wishkah was ranked ninth best album of 1996 in Rolling Stone's 1997 critics' poll.

== Background ==
From the Muddy Banks of the Wishkah was the second Nirvana album released following the death of vocalist and guitarist Kurt Cobain in April 1994. It was compiled primarily by bassist Krist Novoselic, who also wrote the album's liner notes. Novoselic and drummer Dave Grohl had originally intended to release a live album in 1994 to accompany what became MTV Unplugged in New York in a two-disc set originally titled Verse Chorus Verse (which had also been a working title for the band's final studio album, In Utero, as well as the title of two Nirvana songs). However, Novoselic and Grohl reportedly had a difficult time working on the album so soon after Cobain's death, and the album was compiled, but never mixed. The original track list featured several songs not present on From the Muddy Banks of the Wishkah—"Serve the Servants", "Dive", "Rape Me", "Sappy" and "Territorial Pissings"—and different versions of the overlapping songs, other than "Negative Creep" and "Scentless Apprentice".

The album's title refers to the Wishkah River in Aberdeen, Washington, where Cobain claimed to have spent nights sleeping under the Young Street Bridge as a teenager (as referenced in the song "Something in the Way", from Nevermind). This claim has since been refuted by Novoselic, who said, "He never lived under that bridge. He hung out there, but you couldn't live on those muddy banks, with the tide coming up and down. That was his own revisionism."

== Performances used ==
From the Muddy Banks of the Wishkah avoids all songs that appear on MTV Unplugged, with the exception of "Polly", using a heavier, electric version of the song from 1989, as it was originally performed live. It also avoids using any versions of songs previously released as B-sides, or on the home video Live! Tonight! Sold Out!!, which had been compiled by Cobain, and was released in unfinished form in November 1994.

Recording locations of the From the Muddy Banks of the Wishkah album.
From the Muddy Banks of the Wishkah (USA West)
From the Muddy Banks of the Wishkah (Europe)

=== London Astoria ===
From the Muddy Banks of the Wishkah uses three tracks from the band's show at the London Astoria on December 3, 1989, including "Intro", which features Cobain screaming at the start of the show over a distorted guitar as a vocal warm-up. It also uses "Polly" and "Breed", the latter of which then featured the working title "Imodium", and a slower tempo than the version of the song which eventually appeared on Nevermind. These songs mark the only appearance of Chad Channing, the band's drummer from 1988 to 1990, on the compilation.

The London Astoria show was praised by the British music press at the time, with the NME calling the band "Sub Pop's answer to The Beatles".

=== Paramount Theatre ===
Only one song, "Negative Creep", appears from the band's performance at the Paramount Theatre in Seattle on October 31, 1991, although the vinyl version features additional stage banter from this show on side four. The Paramount concert was the band's first performance in Seattle since the release of Nevermind the previous month, and has retrospectively been described by English music journalist Everett True as "the end of an era" that showed that "incontrovertibly, Nirvana was now big news".

"Negative Creep" became the eighth song from the show to be officially released, after "Drain You", "School" and "Been a Son" appeared as Nevermind B-sides in 1991 and 1992, and "About a Girl", "Breed", "Polly" and ""Endless, Nameless" appeared on Live! Tonight! Sold Out!!. The full show was released on CD and DVD as Live at the Paramount as part of the Nevermind 20th anniversary Super Deluxe box set in 2011, and on vinyl in 2019.

=== Teatro Castello ===
The version of "Spank Thru" which appears on the album was taken from the band's show at Teatro Castello in Rome, Italy on November 19, 1991. Although the show was professionally filmed and recorded, "Spank Thru" remains the only song from this concert to be officially released.

=== Paradiso ===
Nirvana were originally scheduled to play at the Melkweg in Amsterdam on November 24, 1991, but due to the band's increasing popularity, the show was rescheduled to a night later at the larger Paradiso in Amsterdam. The versions of "School", "Lithium", "Been a Son" and "Blew" on the compilation are all taken from this show.

As with the Paramount show, several other songs from the Paradiso concert appeared on Live! Tonight!! Sold Out!!. The full show was released in November 2021 on CD and Blu-Ray on the 30th anniversary Super Deluxe version of Nevermind.

=== Del Mar Fairgrounds ===
The versions of "Drain You", "Aneurysm" and "Smells Like Teen Spirit" from the compilation are taken from the band's show at the Del Mar Fairgrounds in Del Mar, California, on December 28, 1991. The show was part of a four-date Californian mini-tour in late December with American rock bands Red Hot Chili Peppers, who headlined, and Pearl Jam, who were the first openers. Describing the tour in his 1993 Nirvana biography Come As You Are: The Story of Nirvana, American music journalist Michael Azerrad wrote that "No one was happy about Nirvana playing second fiddle to the Peppers, but they had already committed to it during the chaos of the American tour. At any rate, Nirvana stole the show."

The full show was released in November 2021 on the 30th anniversary Super Deluxe version of Nevermind, which featured the complete concert on CD.

=== Reading Festival ===
Only one song, "tourette's", appears from the band's headlining set on August 30, 1992 at the annual Reading Festival in Reading, England. The song, which later appeared on In Utero, was introduced by Cobain under its working title of "The Eagle Has Landed".

"tourette's" became the second song from the concert to be officially released, following "Lithium" on Live! Tonight! Sold Out!! The full concert was released as Live at Reading on CD and DVD in November 2009.

=== Springfield Civic Center ===
"Sliver" is taken from the band's show at the Springfield Civic Center, Springfield on November 10, 1993. The vinyl version of the album also features additional stage banter from this concert, as well as a brief clip of band performing "Dumb" before stopping it after Cobain accidentally repeats the second verse instead of playing the bridge. These represent the earliest appearance, chronologically, of second guitarist Pat Smear on the album. "Milk It" from this show was released on the 30th anniversary Deluxe and Super Deluxe editions of the In Utero album in October 2023.

=== "Live and Loud" ===
"Scentless Apprentice" is taken from the band's "Live and Loud" show, which was filmed by MTV on December 13, 1993 at Pier 48 in Seattle. An abridged version of the show, which included "Scentless Apprentice", was first broadcast by the network on December 31, 1993.

The show was set to feature Pearl Jam and Nirvana as co-headliners, but the former band cancelled shortly before the performance, which led to Nirvana playing a longer set. The concert featured American hip-hop act Cypress Hill and American alternative rock band The Breeders as supporting acts. Nirvana's full set was released on CD and DVD as Live and Loud as part of the In Utero 20th anniversary Super Deluxe box set in 2013, and on vinyl in 2019.

=== The Forum ===
"Heart-Shaped Box" is taken from a show, which benefitted the non-profit media watch organization Fairness & Accuracy in Reporting, at The Forum in Los Angeles, on December 30, 1993. At that show Cobain also dedicated a song to the recently deceased River Phoenix. The vinyl version features additional stage banter from this show. "The Man Who Sold the World" from this show appeared on a bootleg in 2022. The band reportedly played to an audience of about 13,000. The full show was released on the 30th anniversary Super Deluxe edition of the In Utero album in October 2023.

=== Seattle Center Arena ===
"Milk It" is the only performance from 1994, taken from the band's show at the Seattle Center Arena on January 7, 1994. The vinyl version features additional stage banter from this show, including a clip of Cobain dedicating a song to recently deceased celebrities Frank Zappa, River Phoenix, Fred Gwynne, Dixie Lee Ray and Tip O'Neil, along with "you dumb ass who just threw water on me." "Serve the Servants" from this show was included on the abandoned Verse Chorus Verse album. The full show was released on the 30th anniversary Super Deluxe edition of the In Utero album in October 2023.

== Release and reception ==
=== Promotion ===
No commercial singles were released from the album, but promotional singles were sent out for radio play for a number of the songs. The first promotional single from the album was "Aneurysm" which reached number 11 on Billboard's US Mainstream Rock airplay chart, number 13 on Billboard's US Alternative Airplay chart, and number 63 on Billboard's all genre US Hot 100 Airplay chart. A music video was also released for "Aneurysm" which reached number one on the Canadian MuchMusic Countdown in November 1996. "Drain You" was released as the album's second promotional single and reached number 44 on the Radio & Records US Alternative Top 50 chart. Follow up promotional singles were released for "Lithium" in Portugal and the Netherlands, and for "Smells Like Teen Spirit" in France, Portugal and Spain where it charted at number 14 on the Spanish airplay chart. A limited edition promotional box set was also released in Australia containing three promotional singles for the songs "Aneurysm", "Heart-Shaped Box", and "Polly". The box set also included Nevermind It's an Interview, a promotional interview disc released in 1992.

=== Commercial performance ===
From the Muddy Banks of the Wishkah became Nirvana's third consecutive album to debut at number one on the US Billboard 200, and fourth to top the chart overall. It also reached number one in Australia, Canada, France, Portugal, and Greece.

=== Critical reception ===
Professional ratings
Review scores
Source	Rating
AllMusic	4/5 stars
Entertainment Weekly	B+
The Guardian	4/5 stars
Los Angeles Times	3.5/4 stars
NME	9/10
Q	4/5 stars
Rolling Stone	4.5/5 stars
The Rolling Stone Album Guide	4/5 stars
Spin	8/10
The Village Voice	A

Lorraine Ali of Rolling Stone described From the Muddy Banks of the Wishkah as the "emotional, visceral flip side" of MTV Unplugged in New York, and as "riotous and liberating", showing the band "in their most natural state, smashing instruments and inducing irreversible tinnitus." Johnny Cigarettes of the NME called it "a gloriously electrifying aural photo-book of a truly legendary rock’n’roll band, the like of which burns across our skies all too rarely in this sterile, cynical and safely post-modern age."

The album was ranked at number nine in Rolling Stone's 1997 critics' poll of the top 10 albums of 1996, and number 14 in Spin's "20 Best Albums of 1996" list. Greek magazine Pop & Rock rated it album of the month in November 1996. Readers of the same magazine voted it sixth best album of the month in December 1996.

=== Legacy ===
In his Allmusic review, Stephen Thomas Erlewine called the compilation "a little scattershot" but "still a terrific record" which "finds a great band in top form." American music critic Robert Christgau wrote, "I play Unplugged to refresh my memory of a sojourner's spirituality. I'll play this one when I want to remember a band's guts, fury, and rock and roll music"; Tim Peacock of uDiscover called the album "the formidable yang to the subtle, acoustic yin of MTV Unplugged," and praised the selections from the band's "scintillating" Paradiso and "transcendent" Del Mar Fairgrounds shows in particular.

Radio & Records described the 1996 documentary Teen Spirit: The Tribute to Kurt Cobain as the "video scrapbook companion to Nirvana's From the Muddy Banks of the Wishkah LP".

== Track listing ==
All tracks are written by Kurt Cobain, except where noted.

No.	Title	Writer(s)	Date/location	Length
1.	"Intro"		December 3, 1989 at the London Astoria	0:52
2.	"School"		November 25, 1991 at Paradiso, Amsterdam, Netherlands	2:40
3.	"Drain You"		December 28, 1991 at Del Mar Fairgrounds, CA	3:34
4.	"Aneurysm"	Cobain, Dave Grohl, Krist Novoselic	December 28, 1991 at Del Mar Fairgrounds, California	4:31
5.	"Smells Like Teen Spirit"	Cobain, Grohl, Novoselic	December 28, 1991 at Del Mar Fairgrounds, California	4:47
6.	"Been a Son"		November 25, 1991 at Paradiso, Amsterdam, Netherlands	2:07
7.	"Lithium"		November 25, 1991 at Paradiso, Amsterdam, Netherlands	4:10
8.	"Sliver"	Cobain, Novoselic	November 10, 1993 at the Springfield Civic Center, Springfield, Massachusetts	1:55
9.	"Spank Thru"		November 19, 1991 at Il Castello Vi de Porta, Castello 41 Rome, Italy	3:10
10.	"Scentless Apprentice"	Cobain, Grohl, Novoselic	December 13, 1993 at Pier 48, Seattle	3:31
11.	"Heart-Shaped Box"		December 30, 1993 at the Great Western Forum, Los Angeles	4:41
12.	"Milk It"		January 7, 1994 at the Seattle Center Arena	3:45
13.	"Negative Creep"		October 31, 1991 at the Paramount Theatre, Seattle, Washington	2:43
14.	"Polly"		December 3, 1989 at the London Astoria	2:30
15.	"Breed"		December 3, 1989 at the London Astoria	3:28
16.	"tourette's"		August 30, 1992 at the Reading Festival, Reading, England	1:55
17.	"Blew"		November 25, 1991 at Paradiso, Amsterdam, Netherlands	3:36

Vinyl edition bonus track
No.	Title	Length
18.	"Untitled" (various concert outtakes and stage banter on side 4)	5:47

Notes:

- The performance of "tourette's" was later released on Live at Reading in 2009.
- The performance of "Negative Creep" was later released as part of the 20th anniversary edition of Nevermind.
- The performance of "Scentless Apprentice" was later released as part of the 20th anniversary edition of In Utero.
- The four Amsterdam songs and three California songs above were later released as part of the 30th anniversary edition of Nevermind.
- Both live performances of "Milk It" and "Heart-Shaped Box" were later released as a part of the 30th anniversary edition of In Utero.

Recording information:

- Tracks 1, 14, 15 by Craig Montgomery
- Tracks 2, 6, 7, 17 by VPRO-TV
- Tracks 3, 4, 5 by Westwood One
- Tracks 8, 11, 12 by Craig Overbay
- Track 9 by Stereoral
- Track 10 for MTV Live and Loud by Scott Litt
- Track 13 by Andy Wallace
- Track 16 by Fujisankei Communications International, Inc.

== Personnel ==
Nirvana

- Kurt Cobain – vocals, guitar
- Krist Novoselic – bass guitar
- Dave Grohl – drums (except on "Intro", "Polly" and "Breed"), background vocals on "Drain You", "Aneurysm", "Been a Son", "Sliver" and "Heart-Shaped Box"
- Chad Channing – drums on "Intro", "Polly" and "Breed"
- Pat Smear – rhythm guitar on "Sliver", "Scentless Apprentice", "Heart-Shaped Box" and "Milk It", background vocals on "Sliver" and "Heart-Shaped Box"

Production

- Scott Litt, Craig Montgomery, Craig Overbay – engineering
- Bob Ludwig – mastering
- Shauna O'Brien, Diane Stata – production, production coordination
- Andy Wallace – engineering, mixing on tracks 3, 4, 5, 10, 12, and 13
- Krist Novoselic – liner notes
- Robert Fisher – design
- Lisa Johnson, Kevin Mazur, Charles Peterson – photography
- Mark Kates – photography

== Charts ==
=== Weekly charts ===
Chart (1996)	Peak position
Australian Albums (ARIA)	1
Australian Alternative Albums (ARIA)	1
Austrian Albums (Ö3 Austria)	3
Belgian Albums (IFPI Belgium)	9
Belgian Albums (Ultratop Flanders)	10
Belgian Albums (Ultratop Wallonia)	4
Canada Top Albums/CDs (RPM)	1
Canada Albums (The Record)	1
Dutch Albums (Album Top 100)	14
Estonian Albums (Sõnumileht)	10
European Top 100 Albums (Music & Media)	3
Finnish Albums (The Official Finnish Charts)	2
French Albums (SNEP)	1
German Albums (Offizielle Top 100)	38
Greek Albums (IFPI Greece)	1
Greek Albums (Pop & Rock)	12
Hungarian Albums (MAHASZ)	4
Irish Albums (IFPI Ireland)	7
Italian Albums (FIMI)	15
Italian Albums (Musica e dischi)	14
Japanese Albums (Oricon)	12
Malaysian Albums (RIM)	8
New Zealand Albums (RMNZ)	2
Norwegian Albums (VG-lista)	8
Portuguese Albums (AFP)	1
Scottish Albums (Official Charts)	3
Spanish Albums (PROMUSICAE)	7
Swedish Albums (Sverigetopplistan)	6
Swiss Albums (Schweizer Hitparade)	9
UK Albums (Official Charts)	4
UK Rock & Metal Albums (Official Charts)	1
US Billboard 200	1
US Top 100 Pop Albums (Cashbox)	1

=== Year-end charts ===
Chart (1996)	Position
Australian Albums (ARIA)	29
Canadian Albums (RPM)	20
Euro Top 100 Albums (Music & Media)	37
French Albums (SNEP)	25
Italian Albums (Musica e dischi)	87
UK Albums Chart	109
US Billboard 200	140

Chart (1997)	Position
Canadian Hard Rock Albums (Nielsen Soundscan)	24
US Billboard 200	182

== Certifications ==
Region	Certification	Certified units/sales
Argentina (CAPIF)	Gold	30,000^{^}
Australia (ARIA)	Platinum	70,000^{^}
Austria (IFPI Austria)	Gold	25,000^{*}
Belgium (BRMA)	Gold	25,000^{*}
Canada (Music Canada)	2× Platinum	200,000^{^}
France (SNEP)	2× Gold	200,000^{*}
Japan (RIAJ)	Gold	100,000^{^}
New Zealand (RMNZ)	Platinum	15,000^{^}
Spain (Promusicae)	Gold	50,000^{^}
United Kingdom (BPI)	Gold	100,000^{*}
United States (RIAA)	Platinum	1,300,000
^{*} Sales figures based on certification alone.^{^} Shipments figures based on certification alone.
