= Live at Reading =

2009 live album by Nirvana

Live album by Nirvana
- Released: November 2, 2009
- Recorded: August 30, 1992
- Venues: Reading Festival, Reading, England
- Genres: Grunge; alternative rock; punk rock
- Length: 78:00
- Label: Geffen
- Producers: Nirvana, Michael Meisel, John Silva

Nirvana chronology
Sliver: The Best of the Box (2005)	Live at Reading (2009)	Icon (2010)

Nirvana video chronology
MTV Unplugged in New York (2007)	Live at Reading (2009)	Live at the Paramount (2011)

Live at Reading is a live CD/DVD by American rock band Nirvana, released on November 2, 2009. It features the band's headlining performance at the Reading Festival in Reading, England, on August 30, 1992. Bootlegged for years, the new issues present the performance for the first time mastered and color corrected.

Live at Reading marks the first time that Chet Powers received songwriting credit on a Nirvana release for the use of his lyrics from the song "Get Together" as the intro for "Territorial Pissings".

== Background ==
Nirvana's appearance at the 1992 Reading Festival was the band's second performance at the annual music festival and their first since the success of their second album Nevermind had elevated them to the position of what Pitchfork called the "biggest" rock band in the world. It was also their final concert in the United Kingdom. The band's first appearance at Reading had been on 23 August 1991, when they played an approximately 40-minute set on the afternoon of the first day of the festival, during their two-week European tour with American rock band Sonic Youth.

The 30 August 1992 concert in Reading occurred shortly after the birth of Frances Bean Cobain, the daughter of Nirvana's vocalist and guitarist Kurt Cobain and his wife Courtney Love, vocalist and guitarist of the American rock band, Hole. It was also performed amid press reports of Nirvana's possible dissolution, due to rumors of Cobain's addiction to heroin and tension within the band. Cobain discussed the rumors in the 1993 Nirvana biography Come As You Are: The Story of Nirvana by Michael Azerrad, calling them examples of "classic, typical English journalism. Sensationalism." As Nirvana's drummer Dave Grohl recalled in a 2018 interview with Kerrang!, "I remember showing up to Reading '92 and there being so many rumours that we weren't going to play, that we had cancelled. I walked backstage and some of my best friends in bands that were opening would see me and say, ‘What are you doing here?' And I'd go, ‘We're fucking headlining!' And they'd be like, ‘You're actually going to play?!' I didn't realise there was any question that we were going to play."

With Nirvana closing the third and final night of the festival, Cobain had programmed the day's bill, which featured acts like the Melvins, the Screaming Trees, Pavement, Bjorn Again, Beastie Boys, L7, Teenage Fanclub (who allowed Eugenius to play one song after the tent they were due to play in blew down), Mudhoney, and Nick Cave and the Bad Seeds, and intentionally excluded what Cobain called "lame-ass limey bands." The 1992 Reading Festival which Nirvana headlined was sold out and it was reported that the co-existing British music festival held at Donington Park had suffered an attendance loss of 10,000 as a result. According to Grohl, there was an audience of 50,000 in attendance at Nirvana's 1992 Reading Festival appearance, while Loudersound reported 60,000.

== The performance ==
Mocking the rumors of his poor health, Cobain was pushed onstage in a wheelchair, wearing a hospital gown and wig, by English music journalist Everett True. He was met by Nirvana's bassist Krist Novoselic, who shook his hand and told the audience that "with the support of his friends and family, he's gonna make it." Cobain pretended to struggle to his feet as he stood up in front of the microphone, sang a line from the Amanda McBroom song "The Rose," then collapsed to the ground. After lying motionless briefly, Cobain returned to his feet, put his guitar on and the band immediately started their set.

The performance included most of Nevermind (everything other than "Something in the Way" and "Endless, Nameless"), along with several songs from their 1989 debut album Bleach, the Sub Pop 200 compilation track "Spank Thru," and set list regulars "Aneurysm," "Been a Son" and the 1990 single, "Sliver." It also included a cover of the Wipers' "D-7," which had been released as a b-side on the "Lithium" single in July 1992, and Fang's "The Money Will Roll Right In." The band also performed the unreleased songs "tourette's," "All Apologies" and "Dumb," all three of which appeared on their final studio album, In Utero, in September 1993. Cobain introduced "All Apologies" by announcing, "This song is dedicated to my 12-day-old daughter, and my wife. She thinks everybody hates her," and then encouraged the crowd to chant, "Courtney, we love you!" Pavement guitarist Scott Kannberg later recalled being impressed by the future In Utero material, telling Matt Allen of Mojo in 2023, "The new songs sounded great. With 'All Apologies' it was like they were a completely different band. I'd seen them a bunch before Nevermind and I was like, 'These guys are actually a lot cooler than I used to think.'"

A large part of the audience sang along to the lyrics of the band's current single "Lithium," which Grohl would later cite it as one of the band's biggest moments. The performance of "Smells Like Teen Spirit," the band's 1991 breakthrough single from Nevermind, incorporated part of the 1976 Boston single "More Than a Feeling" at the beginning, a reference to the similarities between the two songs' main guitar riffs. From the DVD, you can see that after the final song, "Territorial Pissings" the band began trashing their equipment. Novoselic performed several high bass tosses, whilst Cobain pushed over his amplifiers. As his guitar fed back, Grohl started to take apart his drum kit finally throwing his cymbals at the drum set. Then Cobain played the American national anthem, "The Star-Spangled Banner" and finished off the set by climbing down to the crowd and handing his guitar to a fan. He retraced his steps and left the stage.

The show featured the band's friend Antony Hodgkinson, nicknamed "Dancing Tony," dancing onstage for 12 of the 25 songs performed. It was the final of an estimated nine shows that Hodgkinson danced for the band, including their appearances at the 1991 Reading Festival and the 1990 Leeds Polytechnic Students' Union concert.

Cobain played three different guitars during the show. He started by playing a sunburst Fender Jaguar. However, he changed to a sunburst Fender Stratocaster with a black strap, just before playing the eighth song, "About a Girl". For four songs towards the end of the set ("Dumb", "Stay Away", "Spank Thru", "Love Buzz") he changed to a third guitar, a black Stratocaster with a white strap. The guitar was heavily out of tune by the opening chords of "Love Buzz". Cobain tried to retune it several times during the song, but without success, leading him to throw it on the ground at around 2:30 into the performance. For the next song he returned to the sunburst Stratocaster which he then played for the rest of the evening.

== Previously-released songs ==
On January 29, 1993, the performance of "Lithium" was broadcast on ABC's In Concert TV series.

On September 5, 1993, the performances of "Lithium", "In Bloom", and "All Apologies" were broadcast on the UK TV show The Beat.

In November 1994, the performance of "Lithium" appeared on the band's first home video, Live! Tonight! Sold Out!!.

On December 22, 1994, the performances of "Smells Like Teen Spirit", "Sliver", and "About a Girl" were broadcast on the UK TV show The Beat.

In October 1996, "Tourette's" appeared on the Novoselic-compiled live compilation album, From the Muddy Banks of the Wishkah.

Amateur footage of Cobain's wheelchair entrance and performance of "The Rose," as well as the instrument destruction at the end, also appears on Live! Tonight! Sold Out!!.

== Reception ==
Professional ratings
Aggregate scores
Source	Rating
AnyDecentMusic?	8.5/10
Metacritic	93/100
Review scores
Source	Rating
AllMusic	5/5 stars
The A.V. Club	B+
Billboard	4.5/5 stars
Entertainment Weekly	A
MSN Music (Consumer Guide)	A
Pitchfork	9.5/10
PopMatters	10/10
The Rolling Stone Album Guide	5/5 stars
Slant Magazine	4.5/5 stars
Spin	9/10

According to Metacritic, Live at Reading holds a score of 93 out of 100, indicating "universal acclaim" and it is ranked 18th on the site's list of best-reviewed albums, and first among alternative albums.

Stuart Berman of Pitchfork called Live at Reading "an indispensable document of a legendary band at their most invincible." Joe Gross of Spin called the set "a mindblower," describing it as "sloppy indie rock as stadium-filling psychedelic punk." Allmusic's Stephen Thomas Erlewine praised the release as "Nirvana's purest blast of rock & roll" and called it "one of the greatest live rock & roll albums ever."

Cobain himself expressed satisfaction with the performance, giving it "an eight on a scale of ten," according to Come As You Are. Looking back at the set in 2018, Grohl called it "a really reassuring, genuinely magical moment of everything coming together at the right time," despite the band's lack of sufficient practice for the show.

The CD version of Live at Reading debuted at number 37 on the Billboard 200 in the U.S., while the DVD debuted at number 1 in the top 40 on the magazine's Top Music Video Chart, remaining in the top 40 for 25 weeks. Nielson SoundScan reported that, as of 2016 the Live at Reading album has sold 148,000 copies in the United States alone.

== Track listing ==
All tracks are written by Kurt Cobain except where noted.

No.	Title	Writer(s)	Original release	Length
1.	"Breed"		Nevermind (1991)	2:57
2.	"Drain You"		Nevermind	3:54
3.	"Aneurysm"	Cobain, Dave Grohl, Krist Novoselic	"Smells Like Teen Spirit" single (1991)	4:34
4.	"School"		Bleach (1989)	3:12
5.	"Sliver"		"Sliver" single (1990)	2:13
6.	"In Bloom"		Nevermind	4:33
7.	"Come as You Are"		Nevermind	3:34
8.	"Lithium"		Nevermind	4:23
9.	"About a Girl"		Bleach	3:09
10.	"tourette's"		Previously unreleased	1:51
11.	"Polly"		Nevermind	2:48
12.	"Lounge Act"		Nevermind	3:04
13.	"Smells Like Teen Spirit" (DVD version includes Boston's "More Than a Feeling" intro – 5:30)	Cobain, Grohl, Novoselic	Nevermind	4:23
14.	"On a Plain"		Nevermind	3:00
15.	"Negative Creep"		Bleach	2:54
16.	"Been a Son"		Blew EP (1989)	3:23
17.	"All Apologies"		Previously unreleased	3:25
18.	"Blew"		Bleach	5:23

Encore
No.	Title	Writer(s)	Original release	Length
19.	"Dumb"		Previously unreleased	2:34
20.	"Stay Away"		Nevermind	3:41
21.	"Spank Thru"		Sub Pop 200 (1988)
22.	"Love Buzz" (DVD version only, Shocking Blue cover)	Robbie van Leeuwen	Bleach	4:56
23.	"The Money Will Roll Right In" (Fang cover)	Tom Flynn, Chris Wilson	Previously unreleased	2:13
24.	"D-7" (the Wipers cover)	Greg Sage	"Lithium" single (1992)	3:43
25.	"Territorial Pissings"	Cobain, Chet Powers	Nevermind	4:30

== Personnel ==
- Kurt Cobain – vocals, guitar
- Krist Novoselic – bass guitar, backing vocals on "The Money Will Roll Right In", intro vocals on "Territorial Pissings"
- Dave Grohl – drums, backing vocals
- Antony Hodgkinson – dancer

Production

- Nirvana – executive producers
- Michael Meisel – producer
- John Silva – producer
- Jeff Fura – DVD producer
- Nathaniel Kunkel – 5.1 surround and stereo mixes
- Bob Ludwig – audio mastering at Gateway Mastering
- Concert originally filmed by Fujisankei Communications International
- CCI Digital West – DVD production facility
- Kelly McFadden – menu design
- Matt Ferguson – authoring
- Jared J. White – editorial
- Vartan – art direction
- Ryan Rogers at Oddopolis – design
- Charles Peterson – photography
- Monique McGuffin Newman – production manager
- Adam Starr – product manager

== Charts ==
=== Weekly charts ===
Album
Chart (2009)	Peak position
Austrian Albums (Ö3 Austria)	28
Belgian Albums (Ultratop Flanders)	71
Belgian Albums (Ultratop Wallonia)	79
Canadian Albums (Billboard)	17
Dutch Albums (Album Top 100)	64
French Albums (SNEP)	17
German Albums (Offizielle Top 100)	66
Greek Albums (IFPI)	16
Irish Albums (IRMA)	43
Italian Albums (FIMI)	53
Japanese Albums (Oricon)	7
Mexican Albums (Top 100 Mexico)	59
New Zealand Albums (RMNZ)	33
Norwegian Albums (VG-lista)	28
Scottish Albums (Official Charts)	34
Swiss Albums (Schweizer Hitparade)	97
UK Albums (Official Charts)	32
UK Rock & Metal Albums (Official Charts)	2
US Billboard 200	37
US Top Rock Albums (Billboard)	13

Chart (2010)	Peak position
Greek Albums (IFPI)	16

=== DVD charts ===
Chart (2009)	Peak position
Australian Music DVDs (ARIA)	4
Austrian Music DVDs (Ö3 Austria)	3
Belgian Music DVDs (Ultratop Flanders)	1
Belgian Music DVDs (Ultratop Wallonia)	1
Danish Music DVDs (Hitlisten)	9
Dutch Music DVDs (MegaCharts)	25
Hungarian Music DVDs (MAHASZ)	11
Italian Music DVD (FIMI)	9
New Zealand Music DVDs (RIANZ)	4
Spanish Music DVDs (PROMUSICAE)	8
Swedish Music DVDs (Sverigetopplistan)	16
Swiss Music DVDs (Schweizer Hitparade)	6
US Top Music Videos (Billboard)	1

2008 bootleg release
Chart (2008)	Peak position
UK Music Videos (Official Charts)	30

== Certifications ==
=== Album certifications ===
Region	Certification	Certified units/sales
Australia (ARIA)	Gold	35,000^{‡}
United Kingdom (BPI)	Silver	60,000^{*}
^{*} Sales figures based on certification alone.^{‡} Sales+streaming figures based on certification alone.

=== DVD certifications ===
Region	Certification	Certified units/sales
Australia (ARIA)	Platinum	15,000^{^}
New Zealand (RMNZ)	Gold	2,500^{^}
^{^} Shipments figures based on certification alone.
