= Sliver (song) =

1990 single by Nirvana

Single by Nirvana
- B-side: "Dive"
- Released: September 1, 1990 (US); January 28, 1991 (UK)
- Recorded: July 11, 1990
- Studio: Reciprocal Recording (Seattle, Washington)
- Genre: Grunge; punk rock; alternative rock
- Length: 2:16
- Label: Sub Pop
- Songwriters: Kurt Cobain; Krist Novoselic
- Producer: Jack Endino

Nirvana singles chronology
"Blew" (1989)	"Sliver" (1990)	"Candy / Molly's Lips" (1991)

CD issue

Music video
- "Sliver" on YouTube

"Sliver" is a song by the American rock band Nirvana, written by vocalist and guitarist Kurt Cobain and bassist Krist Novoselic. It was first released as a non-album single by the band's then record label, Sub Pop, in the United States in September 1990, and by Tupelo in Britain in January 1991. The same recording was re-released on the compilation album Incesticide by DGC in December 1992, and a new music video, directed by Kevin Kerslake, was released in May 1993.

Described as featuring some of Cobain's most straightforward lyrics, "Sliver" is a semi-autobiographical, first-person account of a child who is forced to spend a day at his grandparents' house, insists on being taken home, falls asleep, and finally wakes up in his "mother's arms." It was recorded shortly before the addition of the band's final drummer, Dave Grohl, and features drums by Dan Peters, of the Seattle rock band, Mudhoney.

Cobain saw the song as an important indicator of Nirvana's musical direction, as the band moved away from the heavier grunge sound of their 1989 debut album, Bleach, towards the more commercial music of their 1991 major label debut, Nevermind.

== Early history ==
"Sliver" was written in 1990. According to the 1993 biography Come As You Are: The Story of Nirvana by Michael Azerrad, the song was written during a rehearsal with Dan Peters, who briefly played the drums with Nirvana while the future of his band, Mudhoney, was uncertain. According to Azerrad, the lyrics to "Sliver" were written shortly before they were recorded, although an acoustic demo of the song, first released on Nirvana box set With the Lights Out in November 2004, suggests that Cobain had written some of the lyrics before entering the studio to record the vocals. "I decided I wanted to write the most ridiculous pop song I had ever written," Cobain explained to Azerrad, in order "to prepare people for the next album," which became their 1991 release, Nevermind.

== "Sliver" single ==
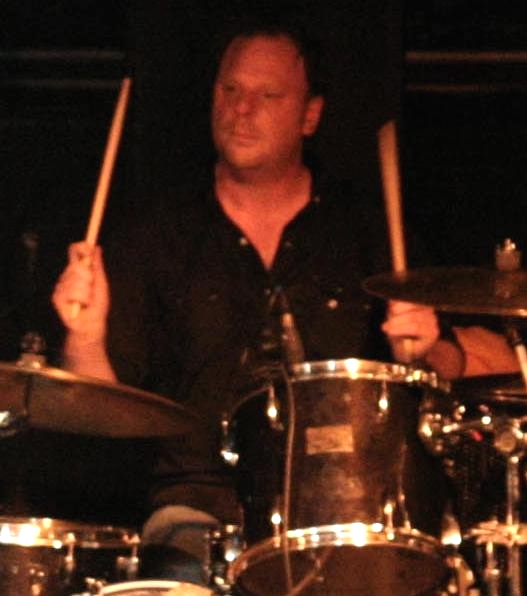
"Sliver" marks the only appearance of Mudhoney drummer Dan Peters on a Nirvana studio recording.

The studio version of "Sliver" was recorded by Jack Endino at Reciprocal Recording in Seattle, Washington. Most of the instruments were recorded on July 11, 1990, during a studio break by the Sub Pop band, TAD "We called Tad up and asked if we could come over and record the song," Cobain recalled in a Melody Maker interview with journalist Push in December 1990. "We used their instruments while they sat around eating. But that's nothing new...the key to a successful album is to get the fuck out of the studio before you're sick of the songs." With Peters on drums, the band recorded the song's music in less than an hour. Two weeks later, on July 24, Cobain returned to the studio and recorded his vocals as well as an additional guitar with Endino, who then mixed the track.

Cobain was pleased with the recording, telling Azerrad, "It has a massive naïveté to it. It was done so fast and raw and perfect that I don't think we could capture that again if we decided to rerecord it. It's just one of those recordings that happened and you can't try to reproduce it.

Unlike most Nirvana songs, "Sliver" was recorded in the studio before it had ever been played live. Its live debut was on September 22, 1990, at the Motor Sports International Garage in Seattle, the only show that Peters ever played with the band. "Sliver" also represents Peters' only appearance on a Nirvana studio recording. Cobain was happy with the time Peters spent with Nirvana, telling Azerrad, "The chemistry was definitely there...We could have ended up writing some really good songs together." As Nirvana bassist Krist Novoselic explained, however, "If Dan were to have joined our band it would've been certain that Mudhoney was finished, and we didn't want to be responsible for that."

== Post-"Sliver" single ==
In December 1992, a live version of "Sliver," recorded at Del Mar Fairgrounds in Del Mar, California, on December 28, 1991, was released as a B-side on the fourth and final Nevermind single, "In Bloom."

The same month, the studio version of "Sliver" appeared on Incesticide, a rarities compilation released in the wake of the surprising success of the band's major label debut, Nevermind. A music video was filmed for the song in March 1993 and first aired in May 1993. It was the only music video released from the album.

The final live performance of "Sliver" was at Nirvana's last concert, at Terminal Eins in Munich, Germany, on March 1, 1994.

== Composition and lyrics ==
=== Music ===
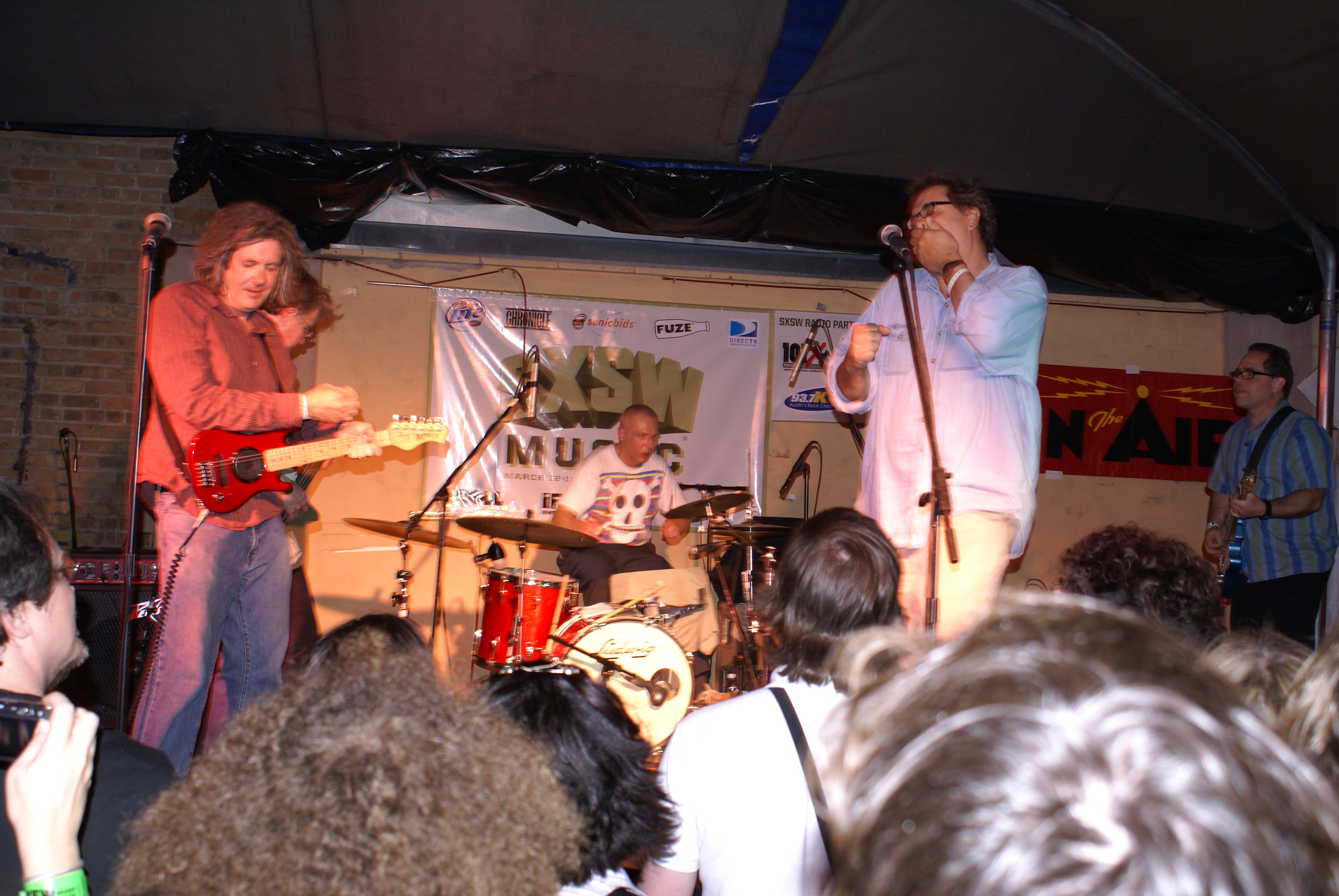
According to Cobain, "Sliver" was inspired by bands like the Vaselines, Beat Happening and Half Japanese (pictured in 2008).

In an October 1990 interview in London, England, Cobain told Rupert Brankin-Frisby of Vice Lizard that the song "was inspired by 'cutie' bands like the Vaselines, Beat Happening and Half Japanese." In a 1992 advertisement for Incesticide, he described it as "an experiment in dynamics and simplicity inspired by Half Japanese, ELP, and ELO."

=== Lyrics ===
According to Azerrad, "Sliver" contained the most literal lyrics that Cobain ever wrote, telling a story of a boy who was left with his grandparents for the day by his parents, had a difficult time eating dinner and playing, and insisted on being taken home until finally falling asleep after eating ice-cream and watching television, and later waking up in his mother's arms. Despite the straightforward lyrics, the song was given an intentionally confusing title, with Cobain explaining, "I had a feeling if I called it 'Sliver,' most people would call it 'Silver.'"

== Release ==
The "Sliver" single was first released on 7-inch vinyl in the US in 1990 by Sub Pop. The initial run of 3,000 copies was pressed on black, marbled blue, or clear pink vinyl. It was released on CD single, 7-inch vinyl and 12-inch vinyl in the UK in 1991 on the Tupelo record label, and peaked at number 90 on the UK Singles Chart. Noted music photographer Charles Peterson provided black and white photography. The single charted at number 23 in Ireland in 1992, due to the success of the band's second album, Nevermind, released in September 1991.

Following its re-release on Incesticide in December 1992, the song was sent to radio and reached number 19 on the US Modern Rock Tracks chart in early 1993. The "Sliver" single re-charted at number 77 on the UK Singles Chart in December 1992, due to the release of Incesticide.

The Incesticide and CD single versions omitted a phone conversation between a hungover Novoselic and Sub Pop co-founder Jonathan Poneman that appears at the end of the song in the vinyl single. The exchange, which ended with a confused-sounding Novoselic advising Poneman to call back later that day, was accidentally recorded on Novoselic's answering machine.

The single was re-released on silver 7-inch vinyl on 26 March 2021 by Jackpot Records and it is limited to 1,000 copies.

=== Posthumous success ===
In August 2024, the "Sliver" single entered the UK Official Vinyl Singles chart at number 39 and the UK Official Physical Singles chart at number 53, marking the band's first appearance on either chart. In March 2025, it made its second appearance on the latter chart, reentering at number 98.

=== Critical reception ===
Reviewing the single in a 1990 issue of Melody Maker, Everett True wrote, "Sure, the vocals are lazily throat splitting, the guitars belligerently grungy, the bass up and out of place . . . but check the melodies, damn fools, check the melodies. The only reason this isn't 'Single Of The Week' is because three even mightier singles were released this week."

=== Legacy ===
In a July 2018 retrospective review of Incesticide, Jenny Pelly of Pitchfork wrote that "Sliver" was "a hilarious caricature" of a pop song that featured "the exaggerated naivete and cool simplicity of Olympia bands that Cobain loved, like Beat Happening and the Go Team.

In 2011, NME ranked the song at number nine on their list of the 10 best Nirvana songs. In 2015, Rolling Stone placed it at number three on their ranking of 102 Nirvana songs. In 2020, it was ranked at number one on Kerrang!'s "The 20 Greatest Nirvana Songs - Ranked" list, with Sam Law calling it "a finely-balanced moment in time, powered by the frontman’s tortured intelligence but not yet corrupted by the anguish and addiction that would eventually spell his demise." In 2023, Stephen Thomas Erlewine ranked it seventh in the A.V. Club's "Essential Nirvana: Their 30 greatest songs, ranked" list.

Rivers Cuomo, of the American alternative rock band Weezer, cited "Sliver" as the song that made the biggest impact on his life in his early 20s, and shared his memory of hearing it for the first time in a 2015 Pitchfork interview: "It was just one of those things where, by the time it got through the first chorus, I was just running around the store ... [It] had the simplicity of the Velvet Underground in the structure and the chords ... [and] the melody and the major chord progression of the pop music I love, like ABBA, but also this sense of destructiveness ... and it came out in this new hybrid style."

In 2022, Paris Jackson paid homage to the music video for "Sliver" with the music video for her song "Lighthouse" which was filmed in a similar setting and also included a picture of Kurt Cobain.

== Music video ==
The music video for "Sliver" was not filmed until March 1993. This meant that when the song featured on ITV's The Chart Show indie chart in February 1991 in the UK, only the single's cover art was shown with the audio of the song playing over it.

The song's music video was directed by Kevin Kerslake, who had also directed three previous videos for the band, "Come As You Are," "Lithium" and "In Bloom." The video starts with Cobain's infant daughter Frances Bean Cobain dancing to the song's bassline, held by Kurt from behind while his arms were sticking out of two holes he cut through a piece of cardboard, then switches to the band performing the song in Cobain's garage. The video shows Dave Grohl on drums, although he does not appear on the track. Cobain does not play the guitar in the video, only singing into a microphone while wearing a red and black striped mohair sweater his wife, Courtney Love, had bought for him from a fan after a Nirvana show in Belfast, Northern Ireland. Cobain's garage itself had been decorated with toys, posters and artifacts he had collected over several years, and kept in storage since before Nevermind was recorded in May 1991. Among the items featured in the video is a Chim-Chim toy which had been given to Cobain by the Japanese rock band Shonen Knife as a present.

The video was accepted by MTV in May, but frames featuring the logos of the magazines Maximumrockandroll and Better Homes and Gardens had to be removed due to the network's rules on product placement. It was also played on MTV Europe. It was also played on The Afternoon Show in Australia.

== Track listings ==
Standard edition (Note: 1990 US 7 inch single, 1991 UK 7 inch single, 2021 US 7 inch single)

1. "Sliver" (Cobain, Novoselic) – 2:16
2. "Dive" (Cobain, Novoselic) – 3:55

1991 UK 12 inch single

3. "About a Girl" (Note: Live February 9, 1990, at the Pine Street Theatre, Portland, OR)

1991 UK CD single

3. "About a Girl"
4. "Spank Thru"

== Charts ==
=== Original 1990 US release ===
Chart (1990–91)	Peak position
Australia Alternative Singles (ARIA)	12
US College Radio (Singles) (CMJ)	30
US College Radio (Albums / EP's) (CMJ)	62
US Progressive Retail (CMJ)	49

=== 1991 UK release ===
Chart (1991)	Peak position
UK Singles (Official Charts); Original 1991 peak	90
UK Indie Singles (Melody Maker); Original 1991 peak	3
UK Indie Singles (Music Week); Original 1991 peak	13
UK Indie Singles (NME); Original 1991 peak	4

=== 1992 re-release ===
Chart (1992)	Peak position
Ireland (IRMA)	23
UK Singles (OCC); 1992 re-entry: only Top 75 archived by OCC for week of 5 Dec 1992	77
UK Indie Singles (Melody Maker); 1992 re-entry	5
UK Indie Singles (Music Week); 1992 re-entry	6
UK Indie Singles (NME); 1992 re-entry	6

=== 1993 US promo release ===
Chart (1993)	Peak position
US Alternative Airplay (Billboard)	19

=== 2015 Jackpot Records release ===
Chart (2015)	Peak position
UK Physical Singles Sales (OCC); Charted as "Sliver/Dive"	81

Chart (2024)	Peak position
UK Physical Singles Sales (OCC); Charted as "Sliver/Dive"	62

Chart (2024)	Peak position
UK Physical Singles Sales (OCC); Charted as "Sliver"	53

Chart (2024)	Peak position
UK Vinyl Singles (OCC); Charted as "Sliver"	39

== Accolades ==
Year	Publication	Country	Accolade	Rank
1998	Kerrang!	United Kingdom	20 Great Nirvana Songs Picked by the Stars	3
2004	Q	United Kingdom	High Spirits: 10 Greatest Nirvana Songs Ever	4
2011	NME	United Kingdom	Nirvana: Their 10 Best Tracks	9
2019	The Guardian	United Kingdom	Nirvana's 20 greatest songs - ranked!	5
2023	The A.V. Club	United States	Essential Nirvana: Their 30 greatest songs, ranked	7

== Other releases ==
- The solo acoustic demo that originally appeared on With the Lights Out was re-released on the compilation album, Sliver: The Best of the Box, in November 2005.
- A live version, recorded at the Paramount Theatre in Seattle on October 31, 1991, appeared on the live video, Live at the Paramount, in September 2011.
- A live version, recorded at the Paradiso in Amsterdam, the Netherlands on November 25, 1991, appeared on the live video, Live! Tonight! Sold Out!!, in November 1994. The full show was released on CD and Blu-ray in November 2021, on the 30th-anniversary "Deluxe" and "Super Deluxe" versions of Nevermind.
- The 30th-anniversary "Deluxe" and "Super Deluxe" versions of Nevermind featured three other live versions of "Sliver." In addition to the full Del Mar show, the set included the band's complete performances at The Palace in Melbourne, Australia on February 2, 1992, and the Nakano Sunplaza in Tokyo, Japan on February 19, 1992, both of which featured versions of the song.
- A live version, recorded at the 1992 Reading Festival in Reading, England on August 30, 1992, appeared on Live at Reading, released in November 2009 on CD and DVD.
- A live version, recorded at the Springfield Civic Center in Springfield, Massachusetts on November 10, 1993, appeared on the live compilation, From the Muddy Banks of the Wishkah, released in November 1996.
- A live version, recorded at Pier 48, in Seattle on December 13, 1993, was released on the live video Live and Loud in September 2013.
- Two live versions, from the band's shows at the Great Western Forum in Inglewood, California on December 30, 1993, and at the Seattle Center Arena in Seattle on January 7, 1994, appeared on the 30th anniversary "Super Deluxe" reissue of Nirvana's final album, In Utero, released in October 2023.

== Cover versions ==
Year	Artist	Album
2007	Asylum Street Spankers	Mommy Says No!
2010	Caspar Babypants	This is Fun!
2011	Little Roy	Battle for Seattle
2012	The Gaslight Anthem	Handwritten
2013	Rise Against	Long Forgotten Songs

== Personnel ==
Adapted from the single liner notes.

- Kurt Cobain (Note: Credited as "Kurdt Kobain") – vocals, guitar
- Krist Novoselic (Note: Credited as "Chris Novoselic") – bass guitar
- Chad Channing – drums (on "Dive")
- Dan Peters – drums ("Sliver")
- Jack Endino – recording ("Sliver"), mixing engineer, producer
- Butch Vig – recording ("Dive")
- Michael Lasine – color photo
- Charles Peterson – B&W photo
- Jane Higgins – design
- Jon Poneman – phone call
