= Live and Loud (Nirvana video) =

Video by Nirvana
- Released: September 23, 2013
- Recorded: December 13, 1993
- Venues: Pier 48, Seattle, Washington
- Genres: Grunge, alternative rock
- Length: 2:05:00
- Label: DGC
- Producer: Scott Litt

Nirvana chronology
| Live at the Paramount (2011) | Live and Loud (2013) |

Live and Loud is a live video by American rock band Nirvana, released on September 23, 2013. It was released as part of the 20th anniversary of the band's third and final studio album, In Utero.

It features the band's full concert on December 13, 1993, at Pier 48 in Seattle, which had been recorded by MTV and broadcast in abridged form. The DVD also contains bonus footage from other performances from the In Utero tour.

As well as the standalone DVD release, a DVD and audio CD version of the show are available packaged together as part the limited edition Super Deluxe 20th anniversary box set reissue of the In Utero album.

== Background ==
Featuring Nirvana, American hip hop act Cypress Hill, and American rock band the Breeders, the Pier 48 concert was pre-recorded for a worldwide New Year's Eve broadcast. The show was originally set to feature American grunge band Pearl Jam as the co-headlining act, and was conceived in part as a reconciliation between Nirvana and Pearl Jam, following Nirvana's vocalist and guitarist Kurt Cobain's attacks on the latter in the press. However, Pearl Jam cancelled their appearance the day of the show, with the official reason being that the band's vocalist, Eddie Vedder, had the flu. This left Nirvana as the sole headliners, and led to the band playing an extended set. As the show's director, Beth McCarthy-Miller, recalled, "[Cobain] couldn't have been more helpful and lovely to me [after Vedder's cancellation]; during sound check, he was just awesome, just asking 'Beth, do you need more?'"

MTV had originally planned to film the show in New York City, but Vedder wanted it to be in his hometown of Seattle, which led to MTV finding Pier 48, an industrial building on the Puget Sound. Amy Finnerty, an MTV employee and friend of the band's, recalled that Pearl Jam's cancellation was "no big deal" to Cobain, and that "he was only concerned that the Breeders would still get to play and were taken care of. He didn't want it to just be 'The Nirvana Show.' That's how he was." In a 2018 Rolling Stone interview, Cypress Hill's lead rapper, B-Real, discussed the impact that Pearl Jam's cancellation had on the night, saying that "it bumped us into the co-headline spot to open up for Nirvana for a MTV event, and that was big for us. So thank you, Eddie Vedder, that was awesome of you not to show up."

=== The performance ===
With Pearl Jam's cancellation, Nirvana's extended set resembled a typical concert from the In Utero tour, although it excluded the two quietest set list regulars, "Polly" and "Dumb". Also absent was the band's 1991 breakthrough single, "Smells Like Teen Spirit". The concert featured material from the band's 1991 sophomore album, Nevermind, and In Utero most prominently, along with three songs from their 1989 debut album, Bleach, and the 1990 single, "Sliver". It also included a cover of "The Man Who Sold the World" by English rock musician David Bowie, which they occasionally performed during the In Utero tour, including their MTV Unplugged appearance the previous month. The show ended with a rare In Utero-era performance of the Nevermind hidden track, "Endless, Nameless".

The performance featured second guitarist Pat Smear, who had joined the band at the start of the In Utero tour, and cellist Lori Goldston. As with other shows on the tour, the stage was decorated with winged anatomical models and fake trees.

At the end of "Endless, Nameless," the band smashed their instruments and stage props, with Cobain decapitating one of the winged models with his guitar. As McCarthy-Miller recalled, "There's a shot where [Cobain] walks up to the camera guy on stage, a guy named Charlie Huntley, and I'm in the booth directing, telling [Charlie] 'Stay with him!' And then Kurt ends up spitting in the lens. It was a moment." Finnerty added, "I was standing on the side of the stage, it was an incredible view, the way they built the set the fans were able to get really close, so, at the end of the show, Kurt was grabbing their hands and pulling them onto the stage. I've seen them trash a lot of stages, and they did it again here, but that one was pretty amazing because the audience was just so close to it all."

The concert, which began with the Breeders' set at 5 p.m., was filmed in front of approximately 2,000 fans. Nirvana's set ended at 8:15 p.m.

=== Previously-released songs ===
The original broadcast first aired at 10 p.m. on December 31, 1993. It featured an edited version of the show, omitting the songs "Sliver," "All Apologies," "Blew," "The Man Who Sold the World," "School," "Come As You Are" and "About a Girl," and including only part of the final song, "Endless, Nameless". It also featured short skits by Anthony Kiedis and Flea of the Red Hot Chili Peppers. The special was followed by a New Year's special, Janet's Live New Year's Jam, a half-hour special featuring a live performance by Janet Jackson from Madison Square Garden in New York, and coverage of Times Square's ball drop.

In October 1996, the Pier 48 version of "Scentless Apprentice" appeared on the live compilation From the Muddy Banks of the Wishkah, the only commercially available official release from the concert prior to the release of the DVD. In November 1996, MTV2 in the US began airing the Pier 48 version of "Drain You" as a music video for promotion of the From the Muddy Banks of the Wishkah album, even though it is a different version recorded on December 28, 1991 at Del Mar Fairgrounds in Del Mar, California, that appears on the album. The video was also played on Rage, Red and ARC in Australia. There is no known footage of the Del Mar Fairgrounds version.

== Track listing ==
Live & Loud: Live at Pier 48, Seattle – 12/13/93 All songs written by Kurt Cobain, except where noted.

1. "Radio Friendly Unit Shifter"
2. "Drain You"
3. "Breed"
4. "Serve the Servants"
5. "Rape Me"
6. "Sliver"
7. "Pennyroyal Tea"
8. "Scentless Apprentice" (Cobain, Grohl, Novoselic)
9. "All Apologies"
10. "Heart-Shaped Box"
11. "Blew"
12. "The Man Who Sold the World" (David Bowie)
13. "School"
14. "Come as You Are"
15. "Lithium"
16. "About a Girl"
17. "Endless, Nameless" (Cobain, Grohl, Novoselic)

DVD bonus tracks

18. "Very Ape" (Live & Loud rehearsal – 12/13/93)
19. "Radio Friendly Unit Shifter" (Live & Loud rehearsal – 12/13/93)
20. "Rape Me" (Live & Loud rehearsal – 12/13/93)
21. "Pennyroyal Tea" (Live & Loud rehearsal – 12/13/93)
22. "Heart-Shaped Box" (Original music video and director's cut)
23. "Rape Me" (Live on Nulle Part Ailleurs – Paris, France – 02/04/94)
24. "Pennyroyal Tea" (Live on Nulle Part Ailleurs – Paris, France – 02/04/94)
25. "Drain You" (Live on Nulle Part Ailleurs – Paris, France – 02/04/94)
26. "Serve the Servants" (Live on Tunnel – Rome, Italy – 02/23/94)
27. "Radio Friendly Unit Shifter" (Live at Terminal 1, Munich, Germany – 03/01/94)
28. "My Best Friend's Girl" (Ric Ocasek) (Live in Munich, Germany – 03/01/94)
29. "Drain You" (Live in Munich, Germany – 03/01/94)

== Personnel ==
=== Nirvana ===
- Kurt Cobain – lead vocals, guitar
- Dave Grohl – drums, backing vocals
- Krist Novoselic – bass guitar
- Pat Smear – guitar, backing vocals
- Chad Channing - Ex drummer

=== Additional personnel ===
- Lori Goldston – cello

== Chart positions ==
| Chart (2013) | Peak position |
|---|---|
| Australian DVD Chart (ARIA) | 2 |
| Belgium DVD Chart (Ultratop) | 9 |
| Dutch DVD Chart (MegaCharts) | 16 |
| Italian Music DVD (FIMI) | 18 |
| Swedish DVD Chart (Sverigetopplistan) | 13 |
| UK Music Videos (Official Charts) | 7 |
| US Top Music Video Sales (Billboard) | 1 |

== 2019 vinyl release ==
Live and Loud was released for the first time on vinyl (as well as a standalone streaming release) on August 30, 2019.

=== Track listing ===
LP1

1. "Radio Friendly Unit Shifter"
2. "Drain You"
3. "Breed"
4. "Serve the Servants"
5. "Rape Me"
6. "Sliver"
7. "Pennyroyal Tea"
8. "Scentless Apprentice"
9. "All Apologies"
10. "Heart-Shaped Box"

LP2

1. "Blew"
2. "The Man Who Sold the World"
3. "School"
4. "Come as You Are"
5. "Lithium"
6. "About a Girl"
7. "Endless, Nameless"

=== Charts ===
| Chart (2019) | Peak position |
|---|---|
| Belgian Albums (Ultratop Wallonia) | 174 |
| Scottish Albums (Official Charts) | 44 |
| UK Album Sales (OCC) | 45 |
| UK Physical Albums (OCC) | 38 |
| UK Vinyl Albums (OCC) | 6 |
| UK Rock & Metal Albums (Official Charts) | 5 |
| US Top Album Sales (Billboard) | 47 |
| US Rock Album Sales (Billboard) | 8 |
| US Alternative Album Sales (Billboard) | 5 |
| US Vinyl Albums (Billboard) | 3 |
