= Drain You =

1991 song by Nirvana

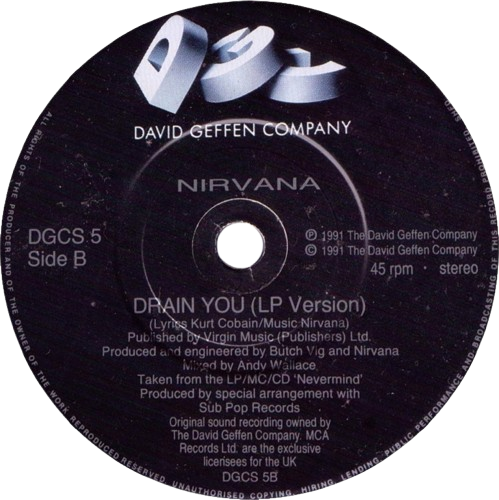
- UK B-side label

Song by Nirvana

from the album Nevermind
- A-side: "Smells Like Teen Spirit" (UK only)
- Released: September 24, 1991
- Recorded: May 1991
- Studio: Sound City (Van Nuys, California)
- Genre: Grunge; punk rock; alternative rock
- Length: 3:43
- Label: DGC Records
- Songwriter: Kurt Cobain (Note: On the original release of Nevermind, the lyrics were credited to Cobain while the music was credited to the whole band. Later releases credit this song solely to Cobain.)
- Producers: Butch Vig; Nirvana

"Drain You"
- "Drain You" promo single for the album From the Muddy Banks of the Wishkah

Promotional single by Nirvana

from the album From the Muddy Banks of the Wishkah
- Released: 1996
- Recorded: Del Mar, California, December 28, 1991
- Genre: Alternative rock; grunge
- Length: 3:34
- Label: DGC Records
- Songwriter: Kurt Cobain
- Producers: Westwood One; Andy Wallace

Nirvana singles chronology
"Aneurysm" (1996)	"Drain You" (1996)	"You Know You're Right" (2002)

"Drain You" is a song by American rock band Nirvana, written by vocalist and guitarist, Kurt Cobain. It is the eighth track on their second album, Nevermind, released in September 1991. The song was released as a promotional single in late 1991, and also appeared as a b-side on UK retail editions of the first single from that album, "Smells Like Teen Spirit".

A live version, recorded on December 28, 1991, at Del Mar Fairgrounds in Del Mar, California, was released as the second promotional single from the live compilation, From the Muddy Banks of the Wishkah, in 1996. This version peaked at number 44 on the Radio & Records US Alternative Top 50 chart.

In a 1993 Rolling Stone, Cobain cited "Drain You" as one of his favorite songs he had written, saying that it was "definitely as good as" their most popular song, "Smells Like Teen Spirit".

== Early history ==
Originally titled "Formula", "Drain You" was written in 1990.

The song was first recorded in the spring of 1991, when Cobain and Nirvana drummer Dave Grohl visited Melvins drummer Dale Crover and his then-girlfriend Debbi Shane in San Francisco, California, on their way to record what became Nevermind in Van Nuys. During their visit, the four recorded several songs on a four track, including "Drain You", under the band name, the Retards. "At the time, Kurt was into starting bands with everybody," Shane recalled, "so we went to the practice space my band Dumbhead shared with the Melvins, and formed the Retards for two days".

According to Shane, the band worked on songs by all four members, with one person recording, and Cobain eventually "announced he had a song, which wasn't a Nirvana song because it didn't have a drum part. When Dale started playing drums, he was like, 'Wow, we have a drum part.'" The instrumental interlude was also developed during this session, which Shane says changed the song's character "from metal to a more Sonic Youth noise thing". With the song's structure now in place, the band brought it to the Nevermind recording sessions at Sound City Studios in May 1991.

== Nevermind ==
According to Nevermind's producer Butch Vig in the 2005 Classic Albums: Nirvana – Nevermind DVD, "Drain You" featured more guitar overdubs than any other song on the album: one clean track and five distorted tracks, two using a Mesa Boogie amp, two using a Fender Bassman amp, and one that they called the "super grunge" track, using a pedal on the Fender Bassman.

Due to Cobain's reluctance to double track his vocals, Vig says he often falsely claimed that certain parts were not recorded correctly or were out of tune, and needed to be recorded again. Cobain recorded three vocal takes, with all three takes being used throughout the recording.

The sounds during the song's interlude were made by Cobain in a variety of ways, including using his squeaky mouse and rubber duck toys that he brought into the studio. Sound engineer Andy Wallace added delay to these sounds to complete the effect.

== Post-Nevermind ==
On September 3, 1991, the band recorded a version during a John Peel session for the BBC at Maida Vale Studios in London. The full session, which also featured versions of the Nevermind hidden track "Endless, Nameless" and then-unreleased "Dumb", was produced by Dale Griffin, was first broadcast on November 3, 1991.. This version of "Drain You" was posthumously released on the 20th anniversary "Deluxe" and "Super Deluxe" versions of Nevermind in September 2011.

In March 1992, a live version, recorded at the Paramount Theatre in Seattle, Washington on October 31, 1991, appeared as a b-side on the second single from Nevermind, for the song "Come as You Are".

A live version, featuring Pat Smear on second guitar, was recorded for the television show Nulle Part Ailleurs in Paris, France on February 4, 1994. During the song's interlude, Cobain's guitar cut out completely, which led to him throwing it to the floor and finishing the song on vocals only.

The final live performance of "Drain You" was at Nirvana's last concert, on March 1, 1994, at Terminal Eins in Munich, Germany.

== Composition ==
=== Music ===
"Drain You" is an alternative rock song that runs for a duration of three minutes and forty-three seconds. According to the sheet music published at Musicnotes.com by BMG Rights Management, it is written in the time signature of common time, with a moderately fast rock tempo of 134 beats per minute. The song is composed in the key of A major, while Kurt Cobain's vocal range spans two octaves and five notes, from the low-note of F#_{3} to the high-note of B_{5}. The song follows a basic sequence of A_{5}–C#_{5}–F#_{5}–B_{5} in the verses and alternates between the chords of D_{5} and B_{5} during the refrain as its chord progression. The tight musical arrangement begins with Cobain strumming his electric guitar unaccompanied while singing, "One baby to another says I'm lucky to have met you." After the song's opening lines, there is an arrival of loud distortion alongside a thunderous combination of drums and bass.

=== Lyrics ===
In the 1993 Nirvana biography Come As You Are: The Story of Nirvana, Michael Azerrad described "Drain You" as "a love song, or rather a song about love", in which the babies in the lyrics "represent two people reduced to a state of perfect innocence by their love". Cobain told Azerrad that the lyrics made him think of "two brat kids who are in the same hospital bed". The song's imagery predicted the medical themes that would feature heavily in the lyrics of Nirvana's following album, In Utero.

According to the 2001 Cobain biography Heavier Than Heaven by Charles Cross, "Drain You" was one of "a half dozen...memorable songs" Cobain wrote following his break-up with American musician, Tobi Vail, in November 1990. Cross described the lyric "It is now my duty to completely drain you" as "both an acknowledgement of the power [Vail] had over [Cobain] and an indictment".

== Release and reception ==
Drain You (Live)
A 23-second sample of "Drain You" from the live album From the Muddy Banks of the Wishkah (1996). Unlike the studio recording, the live version of the song is in standard tuning with Cobain screaming harsher and in a higher pitch.

According to a February 1997 Goldmine article by American journalist Gillian G. Gaar, "Drain You" was originally planned as the second single from Nevermind. A promotional single was released in late 1991, but the song "never really was played" on the radio, according to DGC's director of publicity Jim Merlis, possibly because it was overshadowed by the popularity of "Smells Like Teen Spirit". "Come As You Are" was released as the album's second commercial single instead in March 1992.

Cobain cited "Drain You" as one of his favorite compositions, telling David Fricke in a 1993 Rolling Stone interview that he thought it was as good, if not better, than "Smells Like Teen Spirit". "I love the lyrics, and I never get tired of playing it," he said. "Maybe if it was as big as 'Teen Spirit', I wouldn’t like it as much."

=== Legacy ===
In 2016, Billboard's William Goodman wrote that "Drain You" was "perhaps the Nevermind tune with the poppiest, most tightly-wound songcraft" and that "in another context, it could be translated to any number of genres – but on Nevermind, it's perfection".

In 2013, "Drain You" was voted fifth in Rolling Stone's reader's poll of the top 10 Nirvana songs. In 2015, it was ranked ninth in Rolling Stone's "No Apologies: All 102 Nirvana Songs Ranked" list. In 2019, The Guardian ranked it ninth on their list of "Nirvana's 20 greatest songs". In 2023, Stephen Thomas Erlewine ranked it at number 15 on the A.V. Club's "Essential Nirvana: Their 30 greatest songs, ranked" list.

In 2017, to mark what would have been Kurt Cobain's 50th birthday, the Phonographic Performance Limited released a list of the top 20 most played Nirvana songs on TV and radio in the U.K., in which "Drain You" was ranked at number 11.

The song's title was used for a chapter in Shakey: Neil Young's Biography, a 2002 biography of Canadian rock musician Neil Young, by Jimmy McDonough. The chapter focused on Young's reaction to Cobain's suicide, and included an anecdote of Young enjoying a video of Nirvana performing the song at an unnamed concert.

The Nevermind version of "Drain You" appears in the video games Rock Band 2 and Rock Band Unplugged.

On April 24, 2020, the song was performed by American musician Post Malone as part of his 15-song Nirvana tribute concert, which was livestreamed on YouTube and raised over $4 million for the COVID-19 Solidarity Response Fund.

== Del Mar Fairgrounds version ==
A live version of "Drain You", recorded on December 28, 1991, at Del Mar Fairgrounds in Del Mar, California, appeared on the live compilation From the Muddy Banks of the Wishkah, released in October 1996. It was released as the second promotional single from the album, peaking at number 44 on the US Alternative Top 50 chart which was published by Radio & Records, a sister publication to Billboard. This version was the 11th most played song of 1997 on Boston's WBCN (FM).

== Music video ==
A live version of the song, recorded by MTV at the band's Live and Loud performance on December 13, 1993, at Pier 48 in Seattle, was released as a music video on MTV2 in November 1996, to support the release of the From the Muddy Banks of the Wishkah album, even though it was a different version, recorded at Del Mar Fairgrounds in 1991, that actually appeared on the album. No known footage exists of the Del Mar Fairgrounds performance. The video also aired on Rage, Red and ARC in Australia.

== Personnel ==
Personnel adapted from Nevermind liner notes

- Kurt Cobain – guitars, vocals, sound effects
- Dave Grohl – drums, backing vocals
- Krist Novoselic – bass

== Charts ==
Chart performance for "Drain You"
Chart (1996)	Peak position
US Alternative Top 50 (Radio & Records)	44

Chart (2020)	Peak position
LyricFind U.S. (Billboard)	23

== Certifications ==
Certifications for "Drain You"
Region	Certification	Certified units/sales
Australia (ARIA)	Gold	35,000^{‡}
New Zealand (RMNZ)	Gold	15,000^{‡}
United Kingdom (BPI)	Silver	200,000^{‡}
United States (RIAA)	Gold	500,000^{‡}
^{‡} Sales+streaming figures based on certification alone.

== Accolades ==
Accolades for "Drain You"
Year	Publication	Country	Accolade	Rank
1998	Kerrang!	United Kingdom	20 Great Nirvana Songs Picked by the Stars	11
2013	Rolling Stone	United States	Readers’ Poll: The 10 Best Nirvana Songs	5
2019	The Guardian	United Kingdom	Nirvana's 20 greatest songs – ranked!	10
2023	The A.V. Club	United States	Essential Nirvana: Their 30 greatest songs, ranked	15

== Other releases ==
- The demo recorded with Crover on drums in San Francisco in the spring of 1991 was released on the Nirvana box set, With the Lights Out, in November 2004.
- An alternate mix of the Nevermind version appeared on the 20th anniversary "Super Deluxe" version of Nevermind, which featured a disc of Vig's early "Devonshire" mixes.
- The full Paramount concert, including "Drain You", was released on DVD and Blu-Ray on Live at the Paramount in September 2011.
- A live version, recorded at the Paradiso in Amsterdam, the Netherlands on November 25, 1991, appeared on the live video Live! Tonight! Sold Out!!, released in November 1994. The full show was released on CD and Blu-Ray on the 30th anniversary "Super Deluxe" version of Nevermind in November 2021.
- Three other live versions of "Drain You" appeared on the 30th anniversary "Super Deluxe" version of Nevermind. In addition to the complete Del Mar Fairgrounds show, the release contained the band's full performances at The Palace in Melbourne, Australia on February 2, 1992, and the Nakano Sunplaza in Tokyo, Japan on February 19, 1992, both of which also featured versions of the song.
- A live version, from the band's appearance at the 1992 Reading Festival in Reading on August 30, 1992, appeared on Live at Reading, released on CD and DVD in November 2009.
- A live version, recorded for MTV at Pier 48 in Seattle on December 13, 1993, was released on the live video, Live and Loud, in September 2013. An edited version of the concert, including "Drain You", was first aired on MTV on December 31, 1993.
- Two live versions, from the band's shows at the Great Western Forum in Inglewood, California on December 30, 1993, and at the Seattle Center Arena in Seattle on January 7, 1994, appear on the 30th anniversary "Super Deluxe" reissue of In Utero, released in October 2023.
- The band's performance of the song on Nulle Part Ailleurs in Paris on February 4, 1994, as well as the final live version, recorded at Terminal Einz in Munich on March 1, 1994, both appeared as bonus material on the Live and Loud DVD.

== Cover versions ==
A cover version of "Drain You" was performed by Portland indie folk band Horse Feathers. The cover was released as on vinyl as double-A-sided 7-inch single, alongside "Bonnet of Briars". The single premiered online by PopMatters, which called the cover "moving". "Drain You" was covered by Cincinnati glam rock band Foxy Shazam. Regarding the song, bassist Daisy Caplan stated: "Right away I knew 'Drain You' would be best for us. We’re more of a vocally oriented band than anything else, and the melody line lets us showcase that." Admitting that it would've been intimidating to perform one of Nirvana's big hit singles, he claims five minutes after choosing the song, the band was "getting drunk and jamming out on it". Their cover was included on the 2011 tribute album, Newermind, created in celebration of the 20th anniversary the band's breakthrough album.
