= Aneurysm (song) =

Nirvana song

Promotional single by Nirvana

from the album From the Muddy Banks of the Wishkah
- Released: October 8, 1996
- Recorded: Del Mar, California, December 28, 1991
- Genre: Grunge
- Length: 4:31; 4:35 (Incesticide version); 4:47 (b-side version)
- Label: DGC
- Songwriters: Kurt Cobain; Dave Grohl; Krist Novoselic
- Producers: Westwood One; Andy Wallace

Nirvana singles chronology
"Lake of Fire" (1995)	"Aneurysm" (1996)	"Drain You" (1996)

Music video
- "Aneurysm" on YouTube

"Aneurysm" is a song by the American rock band Nirvana, written by vocalist and guitarist Kurt Cobain, bassist Krist Novoselic, and drummer Dave Grohl. It first appeared as a B-side on the band's breakthrough "Smells Like Teen Spirit" single in September 1991. A second studio version was released on the rarities compilation Incesticide in December 1992.

The song is believed to be about Cobain's relationship with Tobi Vail of the American punk rock band Bikini Kill. It is also one of the few Nirvana songs to directly reference drug use.

A live version, recorded on December 28, 1991, at Del Mar Fairgrounds in Del Mar, California, was released as the first promotional single from the live compilation From the Muddy Banks of the Wishkah in November 1996. It reached number 11 on the Billboard Mainstream Rock Tracks chart and number 13 on its Modern Rock Tracks chart. Its music video, featuring a medley of two other live versions from the 1994 home movie Live! Tonight! Sold Out!!, reached number one on the MuchMusic Countdown in Canada in November 1996.

== Origin and recording ==
=== Early history ===
Written in 1990, "Aneurysm" is one of the few Nirvana songs credited to all three members. It was first performed live on November 25, 1990, at the Off Ramp Café in Seattle, Washington.

=== "Smells Like Teen Spirit" single ===
The first studio version was recorded on January 1, 1991, at Music Source in Seattle, Washington, where the band had recorded material for their Blew EP with Steve Fisk in 1989. Still under contract with Sub Pop, the private session was recorded for free by the band's audio engineer Craig Montgomery, who was friends with Music Source employee Brian Nelson. The seven-song session was the band's first with Grohl, who had joined Nirvana in September 1990.

According to Montgomery, the band "would play the songs live and then Kurt would either put a vocal on it or he wouldn't. It was all first take." The session tapes were later purchased by DGC, whom the band officially signed with in April 1991, and the two finished songs, "Aneurysm" and "Even in His Youth," were remixed by Andy Wallace and released as b-sides on the "Smells Like Teen Spirit" single in September 1991.

Both songs were re-released on the Australian and Japanese tour EP, Hormoaning, in January 1992. "Aneurysm" later appeared on the Nirvana rarities box set With the Lights Out in November 2004, and on the 20th anniversary "Deluxe" and "Super Deluxe" editions of Nevermind, in September 2011.

=== Incesticide ===
A second studio version of "Aneurysm" was recorded by Miti Adhikari for the BBC program The Evening Session at Maida Vale Studios in London, England on November 9, 1991. This version was later released on the band's rarities compilation Incesticide in December 1992, along with versions of "Polly" and "Been a Son" from the same session.

Of the four songs recorded during the session, the band spent the longest working on "Aneurysm", using fade-ins and fade-outs on the backing vocals during the verses to give the recording an "unusual" vocal effect, as described by author Gillian G. Garr, and overall "lighter" feel than the Music Source version.

=== Post-Incesticide ===
Despite never being released on a studio album, "Aneurysm" was a regular part of the band's setlist in 1991 and 1992. The song's final live performance was on August 6, 1993, at the King Cat Theatre in Seattle.

== Lyrics and composition ==
=== Music ===
"Aneurysm"
A 28-second sample of the song's first verse. It features an echoed, descending guitar riff built around a simple, crunching two-chord sequence. Cobain loudly snarls parodic lyrics.

"Aneurysm" is a grunge song that lasts for a duration of four minutes and thirty-five seconds. According to the sheet music published at Musicnotes.com by BMG Rights Management, it is written in common time, with a moderately fast rock tempo of 132 beats per minute. "Aneurysm" is composed in the key of B minor, while Kurt Cobain's vocal range spans one octave and five notes, from a low of A_{3} to a high of F♯_{5}. The song has a basic sequence of F♯_{5}–C–B_{5}–A_{5} during the introduction, alternates between the chords of B_{5} and D_{5} in the verses and follows F♯_{5}–G♯_{5}–A_{5}–B♭_{5}–B_{5}–B♭_{5}–A_{5} at the refrain as its chord progression. Its arrangement begins with an extended introduction, opening with an echoed, descending guitar riff. The song's verses are structured around a simplistic, crunching two-chord sequence.

=== Lyrics ===
According to Charles Cross in the 2002 Cobain biography Heavier Than Heaven, "Aneurysm" was the first of "a half dozen" songs written by Cobain following his break-up with American musician Tobi Vail in November 1990. Cross described "Aneurysm" as an attempt to win Vail back, unlike later songs like "Drain You," which instead expressed "his deep level of hurt." Throughout the number, Cobain loudly snarls parodic lyrics insisting listeners to "Come on over and do the twist." His lyrics for the song make fun of pop conventions and drug-use rituals ("shoot the shit"), ("beat me out of me"). The song concludes with enigmatic praise for an unidentified woman: "She keeps it pumpin' straight to my heart."

== Reception ==
Reviewing Incesticide for the NME in December 1992, Angela Lewis dismissed the album's side two as "not terribly good" and wrote that "91s ‘Aneurysm’ is lyrically baffling and sounds tired."

=== Legacy ===
In his AllMusic review of Incesticide, Stephen Thomas Erlewine described "Aneurysm" as "perhaps the greatest single song the group ever recorded." AllMusic's Mark Deming wrote that the song "may have been [Nirvana's] final grunge masterpiece" before the release of their mainstream breakthrough Nevermind in September 1991, and described it as being characterized by "big, loud rock riffs, pop culture parody, self-conscious self-disgust, and a finale worthy of a thousand upheld Bic lighters." Jenny Pelly of Pitchfork called the song "the apex of [Incesticide] and Nirvana's career," writing that it "never fails to put the stupidest grin on my face, and I cannot hear it without flailing every inch of my body to its squirming emotional upheaval, without jerking my shoulders to its torrential feedback of the heart, as if succumbing to every knot and crevice of this punk song could save my life." Pitchfork's Jeremy D. Larson called it "an absolutely perfect, blood-boiling, body-moving, and still severely underrated song."

In 2013, "Aneurysm" was voted the seventh-best Nirvana song in a Rolling Stone's reader's poll. In 2015, it was ranked at number 30 on Rolling Stone's "No Apologies: All 102 Nirvana Songs Ranked" list. In 2019, The Guardian placed it at number six on their list of Nirvana's 20 greatest songs, with Alex Petridis calling it "every bit the equal of anything on Nevermind."

In 2017, to mark what would have been Cobain's 50th birthday, the Phonographic Performance Limited released a list of the top 20 most played Nirvana songs on television and radio in the UK, in which "Aneurysm" was ranked at number nine.

=== Covers ===
On April 10, 2014, "Aneurysm" was performed by surviving Nirvana members Grohl, Novoselic and Pat Smear, with lead vocals by Kim Gordon, vocalist and bassist of the American indie rock band Sonic Youth, at Nirvana's Rock and Roll Hall of Fame induction ceremony at Barclays Centre in Brooklyn, New York. Rolling Stone named it one of the 10 Best Cover Songs of 2014, calling it a "fitting" end to the ceremony given Sonic Youth's role in helping Nirvana attain mainstream success, and writing that "Kurt would've approved." Gordon discussed the performance in her 2015 autobiography Girl in a Band, writing that "Onstage, I was reminded that Kurt was the most intense performer I had ever seen ... I sang 'Aneurysm,' with its chorus, 'Beat me out of me,' bringing in all my own rage and hurt from the last few years - a four-minute-long explosion of grief, where I could finally let myself feel the furious sadness of Kurt's death and everything else surrounding it."

== Del Mar Fairgrounds version ==
A live version of "Aneurysm," recorded on December 28, 1991, at Del Mar Fairgrounds in Del Mar, California, appeared on the live compilation From the Muddy Banks of the Wishkah, released in October 1996. It was released as the album's first promotional single, peaking at number 11 on Billboard's Modern Rock Tracks chart and number 13 on Billboard's Alternative Songs chart. The song also received some radio airplay in Australia. It was also voted in at number 17 on Poland's LP3 chart in 1996. In a review of the album for Melody Maker, journalist David Bennun stated that ""Aneurysm" really does mimic arteries imploding in your brain".

== Music video ==
Footage of the band performing the song from a 1994 home video, Live! Tonight! Sold Out!!, was used as a music video on MTV, MuchMusic, and The Box to promote the From the Muddy Banks of the Wishkah album in 1996, even though it is a different version that appears on the album. The Live! Tonight!! Sold Out!! version is an edit of two different live versions, from shows at the Paradiso in Amsterdam, Netherlands on November 25, 1991, and the Hollywood Rock festival in Rio de Janeiro, Brazil on January 23, 1993. No footage of the Del Mar Fairgrounds performance is known to exist.

The "Aneurysm" video reached number one on the Canadian MuchMusic Countdown in November 1996. The video was also played on Rage and Red in Australia, and on The Box in the UK and Ireland.

== Charts ==
=== Weekly charts ===
(From the Muddy Banks of the Wishkah version)

Chart (1996)	Peak position
Canada Top Singles (RPM)	49
Canada Contemporary Album Radio (The Record)	38
Canada Rock/Alternative (RPM)	1
Finland Airplay (The Official Finnish Charts)	40
US Radio Songs (Billboard)	63
US Mainstream Rock Airplay (Billboard)	11
US Alternative Airplay (Billboard)	13
US Rock Tracks Top 50 (Radio & Records)	22
US Alternative Top 50 (Radio & Records)	12
US Active rock Top 50 (Radio & Records)	10

=== Year-end charts ===
Chart (1996)	Peak position
Canada Rock/Alternative (RPM)	8
US Alternative (Radio & Records)	94
US Mainstream Rock (Billboard)	97
US Modern Rock (Billboard)	90

== Accolades ==
Year	Publication	Country	Accolade	Rank
1998	Kerrang!	United Kingdom	20 Great Nirvana Songs Picked by the Stars	15

== Other releases ==
- A live version, recorded at the Paramount Theatre in Seattle, Washington on October 31, 1991, was released on DVD and Blu-Ray on Live at the Paramount in September 2011.
- The full "Live in Amsterdam" version recorded at the Paradiso on November 25, 1991 was released in November 2021 on the 30th anniversary "Super Deluxe" version of Nevermind, which featured the complete show on CD and Blu-Ray. This version of Nevermind also featured the full Del Mar Fairgrounds show, as well as the band's complete performances at The Palace in Melbourne, Australia on February 1, 1992 and the Nakano Sunplaza in Tokyo, Japan on February 19, 1992, both of which also featured versions of "Aneurysm."
- A live version, from the band's 1992 Reading Festival appearance at Reading, England on August 30, 1992, appeared on Live at Reading, released on CD and DVD in November 2009.

== Covers ==
Nashville songwriter/producer Shane Tutmarc released an all electronic version of the song as a single, and music video, in 2013.

== Bibliography ==
- Azerrad, Michae (1993). Come as You Are: The Story of Nirvana. New York City: Doubleday. ISBN 0-86369-746-1.
- St. Thomas, Kurt; Smith, Troy (2004). Nirvana: The Chosen Rejects. St. Martin's Press. ISBN 0-312-20663-1.
