= Endless, Nameless (song) =

1991 song by Nirvana

- "Endless, Nameless" cover art for 7-inch single

Promotional single by Nirvana

from the album Nevermind
- A-side: "Come as You Are"
- B-side: "Even In His Youth" "Aneurysm"
- Released: September 24 1991
- Recorded: May 1991
- Genre: Grunge; noise rock; sludge metal; no wave; experimental rock
- Length: 6:43
- Label: DGC
- Songwriter: Kurt Cobain
- Producers: Butch Vig; Nirvana

Nirvana singles chronology
"You Know You're Right" (2002)	"Endless, Nameless" (1991)

Nevermind track listing
- 13 tracks: 1. "Smells Like Teen Spirit"; 2. "In Bloom"; 3. "Come as You Are"; 4. "Breed"; 5. "Lithium"; 6. "Polly"; 7. "Territorial Pissings"; 8. "Drain You"; 9. "Lounge Act"; 10. "Stay Away"; 11. "On a Plain"; 12. "Something in the Way"; 13. "Endless, Nameless"

"Endless, Nameless" is a song by the American rock band Nirvana, written by vocalist and guitarist Kurt Cobain. It is the 13th and final song on the band's second studio album, Nevermind, released in September 1991.

This song was released as a hidden track, beginning approximately 10 minutes after the end of the album's final listed song, "Something in the Way", and occupying the same track. It was first credited by name when it was re-released as a B-side on the album's second single, "Come As You Are", in March 1992.

== Origin and recording ==
=== Early history ===
The earliest known live performance of "Endless, Nameless" was at the No More Wars anti–Gulf War benefit show on January 18, 1991, at the Evergreen State College Library 4300 in Olympia, Washington.

=== Nevermind ===
The song was first recorded in the studio during the recording sessions for the band's second album, Nevermind, in May 1991 at Sound City Studios in Van Nuys, California. It was recorded following a failed attempt at recording the future Nevermind single "Lithium," with a "frustrated" Cobain instructing producer Butch Vig to continue recording while he, Grohl and Novoselic began playing "Endless, Nameless." As Vig recalled, “the rage and frustration in [Cobain's] voice was fuckin’ scary to hear, because he kind of lost it.” Vig remembered Cobain being "really pissed off, thrashing and screaming" during the take.

Unlike the rest of Nevermind, the song was recorded live, with no overdubs added afterwards. Cobain's vocals and guitar were recorded in the middle of the room, with Cobain singing into a Shure SM57 microphone that had been setup for conversation and not music. Vig recalled that "we had tremendous bleed from the bass and drums all pouring into Kurt's microphone." Cobain smashed his guitar during the recording, which halted recording for the day after the band realized it was the only left-handed guitar available. According to the 1993 Nirvana biography Come As You Are by Michael Azerrad, the sound of Cobain smashing the guitar can be heard around 19:32 on the track. A photograph of the destroyed guitar, a black Japanese Fender Stratocaster and not a Mosrite as claimed by Vig, appears in Come As You Are.

=== Post-Nevermind ===
On September 3, 1991, the song was recorded during a John Peel session for the BBC by Dale Griffin at Maida Vale Studios in London, England. This version of the song featured Cobain briefly singing part of "Turning Japanese", the 1980 single by English rock band the Vapors. The full session, which also included versions of the Nevermind song "Drain You" and future In Utero song "Dumb", was first broadcast on November 3, 1991.

When played live, "Endless, Nameless" was usually performed last, with the band members frequently destroying their instruments and the stage during the end. The final live performance of the song was on December 13, 1993, at Pier 48 in Seattle during the Live and Loud concert, filmed for MTV. The original broadcast of the performance, on December 31, 1993, only included a noise jam at the end of the recognizable song that was not credited as "Endless, Nameless." However, the jam was included as part of the song when the full show was released on DVD in September 2013.

== Composition ==
According to Come As You Are, Cobain himself was unsure of what he was singing during their first performance of the song, but believed the lyrics included the lines, "I think I can, I know I can."

== Release and reception ==
According to author Chuck Crisafulli, the song's placement on Nevermind was in part inspired by the use of hidden tracks by the Beatles, such as "Her Majesty" on their 1969 album, Abbey Road.

In a 1991 interview with ICE, Geffen Records’ vice president of marketing Robert Smith explained that using the song as a hidden track "was kind of a joke for the band to do, as in we're not going to list it in the packaging, or mention it exists. It's for that person who plays the CD, it ends, they're walking around the house and ten minutes later... Kaboom!" In the 1992 promotional interview CD, Nevermind: It's an Interview, Grohl theorized that "the original reason for [the song's placement] was because 'Something in the Way' is sort of a slow song. It's the last song on the record and most likely to be listened to by someone who would have a carousel player. So, why not screw up their little carousel deal?"

The song was accidentally omitted from the first pressing of Nevermind, which led to many who purchased this version of the album later trading their copies in for the less valuable second pressing. The album features a runtime of 59 minutes and 23 seconds with the song, and 42 minutes and 39 seconds without it. The album's mastering engineer, Howie Weinberg, recalled receiving "a heavy call from Kurt" after the band noticed the song's initial absence, asking him, "Where the hell is the extra song?" and demanding he "Fix it!"

=== Legacy ===
In 2015, Rolling Stone ranked "Endless, Nameless" at number 60 on their ranking of all 102 Nirvana songs. In 2019, Vulture ranked it at number 16 on their "Best Nirvana Songs, Ranked" list, calling it "a revolting sound that Nirvana brought to bear on millions of Middle American homes" that "surfaced like a nightmare, a cherry bomb in a disc changer, Cobain’s stomach pain manifested in sound." In 2023, PopMatters included it on their list of "The 10 Heaviest Nirvana Songs," with Dean Brown describing it as "an obstinate emission hell-bent on rupturing the mournful mood left by 'Something in the Way.'"

American musical comedian "Weird Al" Yankovic parodied the song on his 1992 album Off the Deep End with the seven-second-long hidden track, "Bite Me." Off the Deep End also featured the lead single "Smells Like Nirvana," a parody of the 1991 Nevermind single "Smells Like Teen Spirit," and an album cover that parodied the cover of Nevermind.

== Track listing ==
7" vinyl

All tracks are written by Kurt Cobain.

No.	Title	Length
1.	"Endless, Nameless"	6:43
2.	"Even in His Youth"	3:03
3.	"Aneurysm"	4:47
Total length:		14:33

"Even in His Youth" and "Aneurysm" originally appeared as B-sides on the "Smells Like Teen Spirit" single, released in September 1991.

== Other releases ==
- A live version of the song, from the band's appearance at the 1991 Reading Festival in Reading, England on August 23, 1991, appeared on the live video The Year Punk Broke, released in 1992. Footage from this performance of the song, including Cobain jumping into the drum set at the end, later appeared in the music video for "Lithium" in 1992.
- The studio version recorded for the BBC in London on September 3, 1991 appeared on the Nirvana box set With the Lights Out, in November 2004.
- A live version of the song, recorded at the Paramount Theatre in Seattle on October 31, 1991, appeared on the live video Live! Tonight! Sold Out!!, released in November 1994. Footage from this performance of the song also later appeared in the "Lithium" video. The full concert was released on DVD and Blu-ray in September 2011.

== Personnel ==
- Kurt Cobain – guitar, vocals
- Krist Novoselic – bass guitar
- Dave Grohl – drums
