= Breed (song) =

Song by Nirvana

from the album Nevermind
- Released: September 24, 1991
- Recorded: May 1991
- Studio: Sound City (Van Nuys, California); Devonshire (North Hollywood, California)
- Genre: Punk rock
- Length: 3:03
- Label: DGC
- Songwriter: Kurt Cobain (Note: On the original release of Nevermind, the lyrics were credited to Cobain while the music was credited to the whole band. Later releases credit this song solely to Cobain.)
- Producers: Butch Vig; Nirvana

"Breed" is a song by the American grunge band Nirvana, written by vocalist and guitarist Kurt Cobain. It is the fourth song on their second studio album, Nevermind, released in September 1991.

Originally titled "Imodium", the demo for "Breed" had a slower tempo. It was one of two Nevermind songs, along with "Polly", dating back to 1989, when the band were still supporting their debut album, Bleach. It was never released as a single, but remained a regular part of the band's setlist until Cobain's suicide in April 1994.

== Early history ==
Written by Cobain in 1989, "Breed" was originally titled "Imodium", after the anti-diarrhea medicine used by Tad Doyle, lead singer of Seattle rock band Tad, during Nirvana's and Tad's shared European tour. It was first performed live on October 8, 1989, at the Lif Ticket Lounge in Omaha, Nebraska.

"Breed" was first recorded in the studio in April 1990 by Butch Vig at Smart Studios in Madison, Wisconsin, during the recording sessions for what was intended to be the band's second album on Sub Pop, their original label. However, this planned album was cancelled after the departure of drummer Chad Channing, and the session was instead used as a demo tape, which led to the band signing with DGC Records in 1991.

== Nevermind ==
Vig re-recorded the song during the sessions for what became the band's second album and major label debut, Nevermind, in May 1991 at Sound City Studios in Van Nuys, California. Cobain recorded four vocal takes for the song, with each successive take "getting worse because he blew his voice out," as Vig recalls. The first take was chosen as the master. Both recordings of the song also feature the guitar being panned from one channel to the next during the guitar solo to create what Cobain biographer Charles R. Cross called "a dizzying" effect.

== Post-Nevermind ==
"Breed" was performed for the last time live at Nirvana's final concert, at Terminal Eins in Munich, Germany on March 1, 1994.

== Composition ==
"Breed"
A 20-second sample of the song's first verse and chorus. "Breed" is a surging punk rock song that showcases purposefully nonsensical lyrics. They address themes of teenage apathy and fear in the American middle-class.

=== Music ===
"Breed" is a punk rock song that runs for a duration of three minutes and three seconds. According to the sheet music published at Musicnotes.com by BMG Rights Management, it is written in the time signature of common time, with a moderately fast rock tempo of 160 beats per minute. "Breed" is composed in the key of F♯ minor, while Kurt Cobain's vocal range spans one octave and three notes, from the low-note of C_{5} to the high-note of F♯_{5}. The song follows a basic sequence of F♯_{5}–E_{5}–F♯_{5}–A_{5}–E_{5} in the verses and bridge and D_{5}–A_{5}–C_{5}–B_{5} during the refrain as its chord progression.

=== Lyrics ===
Lyrically, the song addresses themes of teenage apathy and fear within the American middle-class. Stevie Chick of Kerrang wrote that lyrics such as "We can plant a house, we can build a tree" displayed Cobain's "gift for crafting witty, purposeful nonsense."

== Reception ==
In 2015, Rolling Stone ranked "Breed" at number four on their ranking of 102 Nirvana songs, with Julianne Escobedo Shepherd calling it "one of the most alive songs on Nevermind." In 2020, it was ranked 13th on Kerrang!'s "The 20 Greatest Nirvana Songs – Ranked" list, with Sam Law writing that it was "probably Nirvana's greatest heads-down banger," and that "its 184 seconds feel guaranteed to light the fuse on every mosh within a 100-mile radius." In 2023, Stephen Thomas Erlewine ranked it at number 13 on the A.V. Club's "Essential Nirvana: Their 30 greatest songs, ranked" list.

In 2017, to mark what would have been Cobain's 50th birthday, the Phonographic Performance Limited released a list of the top 20 most played Nirvana songs on television and the radio in the United Kingdom, in which "Breed" was ranked at number 13.

Fans have observed that there are some musical similarities between "Breed" and Wipers' song "Potential Suicide". Nirvana also covered their tracks "D-7" and "Return of the Rat".

On April 24, 2020, the song was performed by American musicians Post Malone and Travis Barker during their 15-song Nirvana tribute concert, which was livestreamed on YouTube and raised more than $4 million for the COVID-19 Solidarity Response Fund.

== Legacy ==
In 2022, actor Jim Carrey said that "'Breed' is one of the greatest, unsung, really... It's kind of an unsung piece; it's overshadowed by other hits they had. But 'Breed' is one of the most kick-ass tracks ever in history. It's wonderful".

== In popular culture ==
The Nevermind version of "Breed" appears in the 2007 American action film Shoot 'Em Up, directed by Michael Davis. It also appears in the video games Guitar Hero: On Tour, Tony Hawk's Proving Ground and MotorStorm. On October 21, 2008, it was released as downloadable content for the music-based video game series Rock Band as part of "Nirvana Pack 01". It was also added to the list of tracks playable in the video game Fortnite Festival on May 2, 2024.

The surviving members of Nirvana performed the song with St. Vincent on January 30, 2025 at Kia Forum in Inglewood, California for FireAid to help with relief efforts for the January 2025 Southern California wildfires.

The song is the opening theme to the Japanese anime television series, The Guy She Was Interested in Wasn't a Guy at All, set to premiere in January 2027.

== Personnel ==
Personnel taken from the liner notes of Nevermind

- Kurt Cobain – guitar, vocals
- Dave Grohl – drums
- Krist Novoselic – bass

== Certifications ==
Sales certifications for "Breed"
Region	Certification	Certified units/sales
Australia (ARIA)	Gold	35,000^{‡}
New Zealand (RMNZ)	Gold	15,000^{‡}
United Kingdom (BPI) Sales since 2004	Silver	200,000^{‡}
United States (RIAA)	Gold	500,000^{‡}
^{‡} Sales+streaming figures based on certification alone.

== Accolades ==
Year	Publication	Country	Accolade	Rank
2020	Kerrang!	United Kingdom	"The 20 Greatest Nirvana Songs - Ranked"	13
2023	The A.V. Club	United States	"Essential Nirvana: Their 30 greatest songs, ranked"	13

== Other releases ==
- A live version, recorded on December 3, 1989 at the London Astoria in London, England, appeared on the live compilation From the Muddy Banks of the Wishkah in November 1996. It features Chad Channing on drums.
- The studio version recorded at Smart Studios in April 1990 was released on the 20th anniversary "deluxe" and "super deluxe" versions of Nevermind in September 2011.
- A live version, recorded at the Commodore Ballroom in Vancouver, Canada, appeared as an Easter egg on the live video Live at the Paramount, released on DVD and Blu-ray in September 2011.
- An early "rough mix" of the Nevermind version appeared on the band's posthumous box set, With the Lights Out, in November 2004. In September 2011, a second mix appeared on the 20th anniversary "super deluxe" version of Nevermind, which contained the early "Devonshire mixes" for the album.
- A live version, recorded during the band's October 31, 1991 show at the Paramount Theatre in Seattle, Washington, appeared on the live video Live! Tonight! Sold Out!! in November 1994. The full concert was released on DVD and Blu-ray on Live at the Paramount.
- In November 2021, a version of the song recorded at the Paradiso in Amsterdam, the Netherlands on November 25, 1991 was released on Blu-ray and CD on the 30th anniversary "super deluxe" version of Nevermind.
- The 30th anniversary "super deluxe" version of Nevermind also featured live versions of the song recorded at Del Mar Fairgrounds in Del Mar, California on December 28, 1991, at The Palace in Melbourne, Australia on February 2, 1992, and at the Nakano Sunplaza in Tokyo, Japan on February 19, 1992.
- A live version, recorded at the 1992 Reading Festival, on August 30, 1992, in Reading, England, appeared on the CD and DVD release Live at Reading in November 2009.
- A live version, recorded for MTV on December 13, 1993, at Pier 48 in Seattle, Washington, appeared on the live video, Live and Loud in September 2013, An edited version of the show, including "Breed," first aired on MTV on December 31, 1993.
- The 30th anniversary "super deluxe" reissue of Nirvana's final studio album, In Utero, released in October 2023, featured the band's full concerts at the Great Western Forum in Inglewood, California on December 30, 1993, and at the Seattle Center Arena in Seattle on January 7, 1994. Both shows featured performances of "Breed".

== Cover versions ==
Year	Artist	Album
2002	Steve Earle	Side Tracks
2007	Otep	The Ascension
