= The Palace (entertainment complex) =

Former Australian entertainment complex

Coordinates: 37°52′02.32″S 144°58′32.06″E

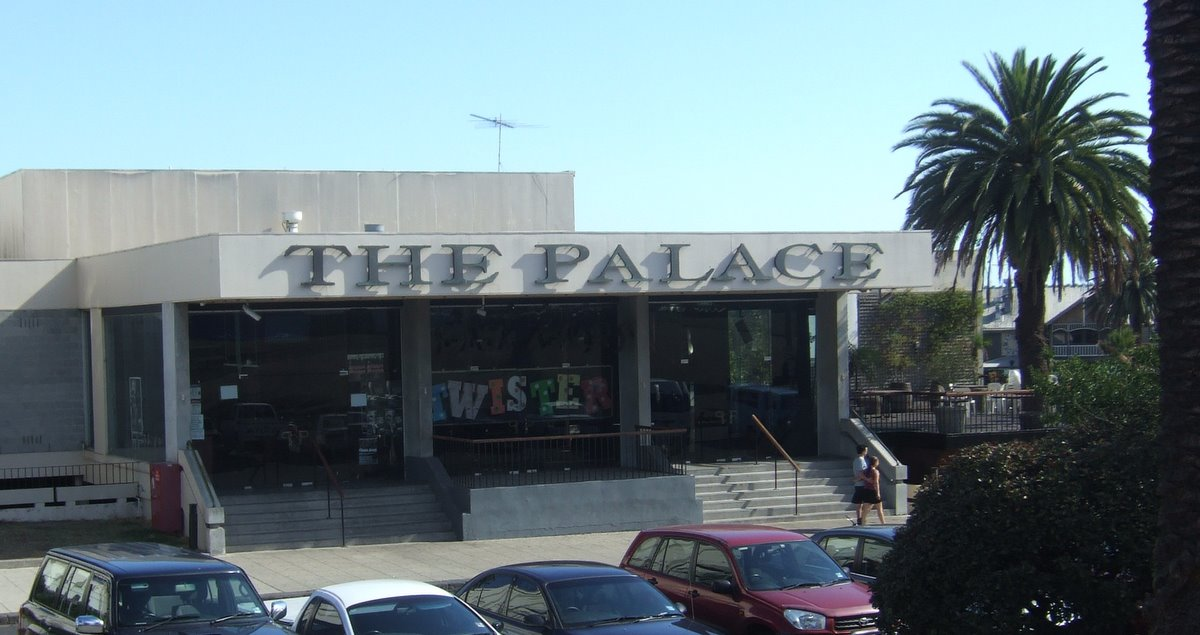

The Palace was an entertainment complex located in St Kilda, Melbourne, Australia. It was built in 1972 on the site of the former Palais de Danse, which had burned down in 1968. It hosted both local and international bands and performances over thirty-five years, one of the most iconic being Nirvana’s Nevermind World Tour concerts in 1992, before its closure on 12 June 2007 after a lengthy legal battle between the Victorian state government and The Palace's former operators, Bradto Pty. Ltd.

Less than a month after its closure, on 11 July 2007, the building was badly damaged by a fire. Half of the former nightclub was destroyed. Seventy firefighters fought the blaze which brought Jacka Boulevard to a standstill. They were forced to fight the fire from outside the building as vandalism to the dancefloor had made it too dangerous to fight from the inside. It took an hour and a half to control the blaze. The arson squad investigated how the fire started, determining the fire was fuelled by rolled up carpet and chipboard which had been pulled from the roof and ceiling. The building has subsequently been completely demolished.
