= Nirvana bootleg recordings =

Unofficial Nirvana releases

The Nirvana bootleg recordings are a number of recordings of musical performances by the American rock band Nirvana, which were previously not officially released by the band, or under any other legal authority. The recordings consist of both live performances and outtakes from studio sessions unavailable as a legal release.

The 1997 book Nirvana: The Alternative CD & Vinyl Collectors Guide identified more than 300 Nirvana CD and vinyl bootlegs.

== Overview ==
Nirvana was formed by singer/guitarist Kurt Cobain and bassist Krist Novoselic in Aberdeen, Washington, in 1987, and featured drummer Dave Grohl for the majority of the band's career. They had previously gone through a succession of drummers, most notably Chad Channing, Dale Crover and Dan Peters. Jason Everman was briefly added as a second guitarist in 1989. Pat Smear joined the band as a touring guitarist in 1993. Although Nirvana existed for less than a decade, they released three studio albums, starting with 1989's Bleach, followed by their major label breakthrough album, Nevermind in 1991. In Utero was released in 1993, just seven months prior to Cobain's death in April 1994. Also released in 1992 was the compilation album Incesticide.

In 1991, Gavin Report stated that Nirvana had appeared on bootlegs sporadically after their 1989 debut album Bleach had been released. This increased during the two-year gap until their second album Nevermind was released in 1991, with early versions of the unreleased Nevermind song "Lithium" appearing on bootlegs with the title "Broken Mirrors".

As Nirvana's popularity grew following the success of Nevermind, unreleased recordings of the band began to surface in the form of unofficial bootleg CDs, often originating from companies in Europe and Japan. The sound quality and album art would frequently range from appalling to appealing, sometimes sounding like and resembling something of a legitimate release. Some of the recordings came from "tape trading" circles while others may have been recorded or obtained specifically for the bootleg CD. Material was sometimes gathered from already existing vinyl bootlegs or other bootleg CDs as they became available. Additionally, songs issued only as a b-side or compilation track became frequent candidates for use as filler material. Nirvana would not see any royalties from these releases, nor would they have anything to do with their production. The first Nirvana bootleg CD was released in 1992 by Post Script, simply titled Europe 1991. Since then, hundreds of recordings of concerts, demos and various unreleased material have surfaced in this format. Billboard reported in August 1992 that Italian record label Living Legend was selling a Nirvana bootleg titled Nirvana: The Live Spirit - Live 1991. Billboard also reported in September 1992 that two companies in Germany had thousands of live recordings by various artists that they were selling as bootlegs, including by Nirvana.

The official release Incesticide was issued in late 1992, including demos, outtakes and radio sessions, some of which were previously circulating in lower quality on bootleg CDs. Despite MTV Unplugged in New York being released less than a year after the performance occurred, it would still become one of the band's most bootlegged shows. Billboard reported in July 1995 that Nirvana bootlegs were on sale in Canada, and in August 1995 that they were on sale in Australia.

After the first several instalments of the unofficial Outcesticide collection came through, the official live album From the Muddy Banks of the Wishkah was released in 1996, containing various performances recorded between 1989 and 1994, and with RPM noting that by that time there were hundreds of live bootlegs in circulation. Billboard reported again in 1997 that Nirvana bootlegs were still being sold. FMQB reported in 2001 that Seattle radio station KNDD had played a live Nirvana bootleg in April to commemorate the anniversary of Cobain's death. The official With the Lights Out box set was released in 2004, which included many rare, unreleased recordings, while the official Live at Reading debuted Nirvana's now classic 1992 Reading Festival performance in 2009, after years of endless bootlegging.

Due to the fact that there is an uncountable number of unofficial releases and their accompanying versions, below is a partial list of the most sought-after and talked about bootleg CD recordings, including the A Season in Hell Part One box set, the Into the Black box set, and the complete Outcesticide series. Since bootleg CDs are notorious for including erroneously listed information pertaining to song titles, dates and venues, the information below has omitted any false listings and replaced them with the correct information.

== Outcesticide albums ==
The Outcesticide albums are the most well known Nirvana bootleg CD series in existence and carry a name recognition second only to Nirvana's official releases. In 2011, NME ranked the first Outcesticide album at number 12 on their list of 30 bootleg albums you need to hear. These unofficial compilation albums consisted of live material, demo recordings, television appearances, radio performances and other various unreleased material. Although Blue Moon Records originally produced the series and manufactured multiple pressings throughout the 1990s, they have been endlessly cloned, with counterfeit versions accounting for the majority of the market. Other companies to later issue the series included Darkside Records, Red Robin Records and Kobra Records, among others. A review by Ultimate Guitar gave Outcesticide: In Memory of Kurt Cobain a score of 8.7 out of 10.

=== Outcesticide: In Memory of Kurt Cobain ===
Released within a month of Kurt Cobain's death in April 1994. All songs written by Kurt Cobain except where noted.

No.	Title	Writer(s)	Length
1.	"If You Must"		3:46
2.	"Downer"		1:36
3.	"Floyd the Barber" (original mix)		2:06
4.	"Paper Cuts" (original mix)		3:50
5.	"Spank Thru"		3:17
6.	"Beeswax"		2:32
7.	"Pen Cap Chew"		2:47
8.	"Blandest"		3:39
9.	"Polly"		2:20
10.	"Don't Want it All"		2:20
11.	"Sappy"		2:22
12.	"Do You Love Me?" (from Hard to Believe - originally performed by Kiss)	Stanley/Ezrin/Fowley	3:27
13.	"Been a Son" (from Blew)		2:21
14.	"Token Eastern Song"		3:26
15.	"Opinion"		1:39
16.	"D-7" (test mix - originally performed by the Wipers)	Sage	2:31
17.	"Breed"		3:03
18.	"Pay to Play"		3:21
19.	"Sappy"		3:24
20.	"Here She Comes Now" (originally performed by The Velvet Underground)	Reed	4:40
21.	"Where Did You Sleep Last Night"	Traditional; Lead Belly	4:58
22.	"Return of the Rat" (from Eight Songs for Greg Sage and The Wipers - originally performed by the Wipers)	Sage	2:59
23.	"Talk to Me"		3:21
Total length:			69:57

- Tracks 1–7 from an early demo tape recorded at Reciprocal Recording in Seattle on January 23, 1988. "Spank Thru" remains unreleased.
- Track 8 recorded summer 1988 at Reciprocal Recording in Seattle with songs that appeared on the "Love Buzz" single and later appeared on With the Lights Out.
- Tracks 9–11 recorded on a 4-track at the Cobain residence in Olympia, Washington, in 1988.
- Track 14 from an audience source recorded live at The Duchess of York in Leeds, England, on October 25, 1989.
- Track 15 recorded for Boy Meets Girl on KAOS radio at The Evergreen State College in Olympia, Washington, on September 25, 1990, and later appeared on With the Lights Out.
- Track 16 from the BBC radio session recorded at Maida Vale Studios in London on October 21, 1990. The final mix appeared on Hormoaning.
- Tracks 17–19 recorded at Smart Studios, Madison, Wisconsin, in April 1990. "Pay to Play" appeared on DGC Rarities Volume 1.
- Tracks 20 and 21 recorded for Nozems-a-Gogo on VPRO radio at Jingle Production Room 2 in Hilversum, Netherlands, on November 25, 1991.
- Track 23 from an audience source recorded live at Bloom in Mezzago, Italy, on November 17, 1991.

=== Outcesticide II: The Needle & the Damage Done ===
A 1997 review stated that "Another excellent compilation hot on the heels of Volume One. Courtney (Love) provided the Rio demo for this one and is thanked on the sleeve. Some songs are pretty rough quality-wise, notably towards the end of the disc, but the rarity factor means it's well worth it". All songs written by Kurt Cobain except where noted.

No.	Title	Writer(s)	Length
1.	"In Bloom"		4:30
2.	"Breed"		3:05
3.	"Help Me I'm Hungry"		2:36
4.	"Oh, the Guilt"		3:12
5.	"Smells Like Teen Spirit"	Cobain/Novoselic/Grohl	4:48
6.	"Pennyroyal Tea"		4:16
7.	"Closing Time"	Cobain/Love/Schemel	2:38
8.	"Heart-Shaped Box"		5:28
9.	"Scentless Apprentice"	Cobain/Novoselic/Grohl	9:43
10.	"Been a Son"		2:07
11.	"Something in the Way"		3:20
12.	"Negative Creep"		2:03
13.	"Where Did You Sleep Last Night"	Traditional; Lead Belly	2:26
14.	"Baba O'Riley" (originally performed by The Who)	Townshend	3:13
15.	"The End" (originally performed by The Doors)	Morrison/Krieger/Manzarek/Densmore	2:22
16.	"Lithium" (mix 6)		2:55
17.	"Dumb"		2:25
18.	"Molly's Lips" (originally performed by The Vaselines)	Kelly/McKee	2:21
19.	"Verse Chorus Verse"		3:07
20.	"The Man Who Sold the World" (originally performed by David Bowie)	Bowie	4:35
21.	"Smells Like Teen Spirit"	Cobain/Novoselic/Grohl	2:56
Total length:			74:14

- Tracks 1 and 16 recorded at Smart Studios in Madison, Wisconsin, in April 1990. "In Bloom" was later featured on the DVD portion of With the Lights Out.
- Tracks 2 and 18 from an audience source recorded live at Kultur-Basar, Hanau, West Germany on November 18, 1989.
- Track 3 from a soundboard source recorded live at U4, Vienna, Austria on November 22, 1989.
- Track 4 from an audience source recorded live at Bloom in Mezzago, Italy, on November 17, 1991.
- Tracks 5, 8 and 9 recorded live at the Hollywood Rock Festival, Rio de Janeiro, Brazil on January 23, 1993. "Smells Like Teen Spirit" features Flea on trumpet.
- Track 6 from a soundboard source recorded live at the Cabaret Metro, Chicago, Illinois, on October 12, 1991.
- Track 7 recorded at BMG Ariola Ltda., Studio B, Rio de Janeiro, Brazil on January 21, 1993, and features members of Hole with Cobain on bass.
- Tracks 10–12 from an acoustic in-store performance recorded live at Northern Lights Records, Minneapolis, Minnesota, on October 14, 1991.
- Track 13 from an audience source recorded live at Castaic Lake Amphitheatre, Castaic, California, on September 26, 1992, where Cobain performed solo acoustic.
- Track 14 from an audience source recorded live at Salle Omnisports, Rennes, France, on December 7, 1991, and features vocals by Novoselic and Grohl.
- Track 15 from an audience source recorded live at Vooruit, Ghent, Belgium on November 23, 1991.
- Track 17 from a soundboard source recorded live at Palaghiaccio, Marino, Italy on February 22, 1994.
- Track 19 from a soundboard source recorded during soundcheck at The Palladium, Hollywood, California, on August 17, 1990, with Dale Crover on drums.
- Track 20 from an audience source recorded live at the Salem Armory Auditorium, Salem, Oregon, on December 14, 1993.
- Track 21 recorded for The Word at Limehouse Studios in London on November 8, 1991.

=== Outcesticide III: The Final Solution ===
A 1997 review stated that "Another great instalment in the Outcesticide series. If you want rare Nirvana, here is the place to find it, and overall the quality of the material used is excellent. As usual, upon release this was copied and re-issued world-wide". All songs written by Kurt Cobain except where noted.

No.	Title	Writer(s)	Length
1.	"Rape Me"		2:49
2.	"Pennyroyal Tea"		3:54
3.	"Drain You"		3:47
4.	"Color Pictures of a Marigold" (from Pocketwatch)	Grohl	3:08
5.	"Dive"	Cobain/Novoselic	3:38
6.	"Mr. Moustache" (early version)		3:38
7.	"Blandest"		3:52
8.	"Even in His Youth"		3:14
9.	"Polly"		2:35
10.	"Smells Like Teen Spirit"	Cobain/Novoselic/Grohl	4:34
11.	"Serve the Servants"		3:24
12.	"Dumb"		2:37
13.	"Tourette's" (early version)		2:09
14.	"Aneurysm" (early version)	Cobain/Novoselic/Grohl	4:43
15.	"Oh, the Guilt" (early version)		3:16
16.	"Dive"	Cobain/Novoselic	4:06
17.	"About a Girl"		2:43
18.	"The Money Will Roll Right In" (originally performed by Fang)	Wilson/Flynn	2:17
19.	"Verse Chorus Verse"		3:14
20.	"Curmudgeon"		2:51
21.	"High on the Hog" (originally performed by Tad)	Tad	2:10
22.	"Raunchola"		4:05
23.	"Beans"		1:17
Total length:			74:19

- Tracks 1–3 recorded for Nulle Part Ailleurs at Canal+ in Paris on February 4, 1994.
- Track 5 from an audience source recorded live at Kultur-Basar in Hanau, West Germany, on November 18, 1989.
- Tracks 6 and 7 recorded summer 1988 at Reciprocal Recording in Seattle with songs that appeared on the "Love Buzz" single. "Blandest" later appeared on With the Lights Out.
- Tracks 8 and 9 recorded at The Music Source in Seattle in September 1989 and later appeared on With the Lights Out.
- Track 10 recorded live at MTV Studios in New York City on January 10, 1992.
- Tracks 11 and 12 recorded for Tunnel at RAI Centro di Produzione TV Studi Nomentano in Rome on February 23, 1994. "Dumb" features Melora Creager on cello.
- Tracks 13 and 18 from an audience source recorded live at the Reading Festival in England on August 30, 1992, and later appeared in soundboard form on Live at Reading. Tourettes being labeled as "The Eagle Has Landed".
- Tracks 14, 15 and 19 from an audience source recorded live at the Off Ramp Café in Seattle on November 25, 1990. The majority of the show is available on the first disc of A Season in Hell Part One.
- Tracks 16 and 17 recorded for Nozems-a-Gogo on VPRO radio at Villa 65 in Hilversum, Netherlands, on November 1, 1989.
- Track 20 from an audience source recorded live at Vooruit in Ghent, Belgium, on November 23, 1991.
- Track 21 from an audience source recorded live at Bloom in Mezzago, Italy, on November 26, 1989, where Cobain performed an encore with Tad.
- Track 22 recorded live at the Community World Theatre in Tacoma, Washington, on January 23, 1988, and later appeared on With the Lights Out, this track includes a Led Zeppelin cover called Moby Dick .
- Track 23 recorded on a 4-track at the Cobain residence in Olympia, Washington, in 1988 and later appeared on With the Lights Out.

=== Outcesticide IV: Rape of the Vaults ===
A 1997 review stated "Another excellent collection of rarities amazing how unreleased songs can be located this late in the day, just when you think you've heard it all, Outcesticide unearths more. This volume even includes a fact-packed booklet as part of its packaging". All songs written by Kurt Cobain except where noted.

No.	Title	Writer(s)	Length
1.	"Pennyroyal Tea" (Scott Litt remix)		3:38
2.	"Spank Thru" (from Sub Pop 200)		3:21
3.	"Territorial Pissings"		2:41
4.	"Smells Like Teen Spirit"	Cobain/Novoselic/Grohl	3:02
5.	"Rape Me" (early version)		2:48
6.	"Pay to Play"		3:44
7.	"Scoff"		3:58
8.	"Love Buzz" (originally performed by Shocking Blue)	van Leeuwen	3:10
9.	"Floyd the Barber"		2:28
10.	"Here She Comes Now" (originally performed by The Velvet Underground)	Reed	3:43
11.	"D-7" (originally performed by the Wipers)	Sage	3:50
12.	"Drain You"		3:00
13.	"About a Girl"		2:45
14.	"Lithium"		4:21
15.	"Blew"		2:58
16.	"All Apologies" (early version)		4:44
17.	"Radio Friendly Unit Shifter"/"My Sharona" (originally performed by The Knack)	Fieger/Averre	5:18
18.	"Sappy"		3:32
19.	"Bambi Slaughter"		1:30
20.	"Clean Up Before She Comes"		3:04
21.	"Black & White Blues"		1:58
22.	"Montage of Heck Part 1"		5:50
23.	"Montage of Heck Part 2"		1:28
Total length:			77:00

- Track 1 appeared on the Wal-Mart and Kmart versions of In Utero, as well as the album's discontinued third single.
- Track 3 recorded for Tonight with Jonathan Ross at The Greenwood in London on December 6, 1991, and later appeared in part on Live! Tonight! Sold Out!!.
- Track 4 recorded for Top of the Pops at BBC Elstree Centre in Hertfordshire, England, on November 28, 1991, and appeared on Live! Tonight! Sold Out!!.
- Track 5 from a soundboard source recorded live at the Teatro Castello in Rome on November 19, 1991.
- Tracks 6 and 10 from a soundboard source recorded live at Duffy's Tavern in Lincoln, Nebraska, on May 13, 1990.
- Tracks 7–9 from a soundboard source recorded live at Bogart's in Long Beach, California, on February 16, 1990, taken from the 7-inch vinyl bootleg Penu Baby.
- Track 11 from an audience source recorded live at the Reading Festival in England on August 30, 1992, and later appeared in soundboard form on Live at Reading.
- Track 12 recorded on a 4-track at the Melvins practice space in San Francisco in April 1991 with Dale Crover on drums and Grohl on bass. The track later appeared without the intro on With the Lights Out.
- Track 13 recorded on a 4-track at the Cobain residence in Olympia, Washington, in 1988 and later appeared on With the Lights Out.
- Track 14 recorded in the television studio of The Evergreen State College in Olympia, Washington, on March 20, 1990.
- Track 15 recorded summer 1988 at Reciprocal Recording in Seattle, Washington, with songs that appeared on the "Love Buzz" single.
- Track 16 from an audience source recorded live at Rock City in Nottingham, England, on December 3, 1991, taken from the 12-inch vinyl bootleg Entertain Us.
- Tracks 17 and 18 from an audience source recorded live at Salle Omnisports in Rennes, France, on February 16, 1994.
- Tracks 19–23 recorded on a 4-track at the Cobain residence, Olympia, Washington, in 1987. "Clean Up Before She Comes" later appeared on With the Lights Out.

=== Outcesticide V: Disintegration ===
Released in 1998. All songs written by Kurt Cobain except where noted.

No.	Title	Writer(s)	Length
1.	"Live Through This" (alternate mix)	Love/Erlandson	4:28
2.	"Love Buzz" (originally performed by Shocking Blue)	van Leeuwen	3:30
3.	"In His Hands"		3:14
4.	"Lithium"		4:07
5.	"Rape Me"		2:27
6.	"On a Plain"		2:46
7.	"Stain"		2:23
8.	"School"		2:50
9.	"Molly's Lips" (originally performed by The Vaselines)	Kelly/McKee	1:58
10.	"Aneurysm"	Cobain/Novoselic/Grohl	4:37
11.	"Love Buzz" (originally performed by Shocking Blue)	van Leeuwen	3:53
12.	"Floyd the Barber"		2:43
13.	"Downer"		2:29
14.	"Mexican Seafood"		2:54
15.	"White Lace and Strange" (originally performed by Thunder and Roses)	Bond	2:39
16.	"Spank Thru"		3:26
17.	"Suicide Samurai"		3:32
18.	"Hairspray Queen"		4:58
19.	"Pen Cap Chew"		4:13
20.	"More Than a Feeling" (originally performed by Boston)	Scholz	0:56
21.	"My Best Friend's Girl" (originally performed by The Cars)	Ocasek	2:24
22.	"Autopilot"		5:07
Total length:			71:46

- Track 1 is a Hole song with prominent vocal contributions from Cobain, which were mixed down before it appeared on Live Through This.
- Track 2 recorded for Nozems-a-Gogo on VPRO radio at Villa 65 in Hilversum, Netherlands, on November 1, 1989.
- Track 3 from a soundboard source recorded during soundcheck at The Palladium in Hollywood, California, on August 17, 1990, with Dale Crover on drums.
- Tracks 4 and 5 from a soundboard source recorded live at Palau Municipal dels Esports in Barcelona, Spain, on February 9, 1994, taken from an FM broadcast.
- Tracks 6–10 recorded at MTV Studios in New York City on January 10, 1992. "On a Plain" and "Stain" were played during soundcheck, while the rest of the songs were performed live but not broadcast.
- Tracks 11–19 recorded for Out of Order on KAOS radio at The Evergreen State College, Olympia, Washington in April 1987 with Aaron Burckhard on drums. "White Lace and Strange" and "Anorexorcist" later appeared on With the Lights Out.
- Track 20 from an audience source recorded live at the Reading Festival in England on August 30, 1992, and later appeared in soundboard form on Live at Reading.
- Track 21 from a TV report recorded live at Terminal 1, Flughafen München-Riem in Munich, Germany, on March 1, 1994, and would be the band's last show.
- Track 22 "You Know You're Right", wrongly transcribed as "Autopilot" by David Frickie, from an audience source recorded live at the Aragon Ballroom in Chicago on October 23, 1993.

== Outcesticide 2022: Resurrection ==
Outcesticide 2022: Resurrection

Compilation album by Nirvana
- Released: February 2022
- Recorded: 1989–1993
- Genres: Alternative rock, grunge
- Length: 70:49
- Label: Not On Label (BMCD 2022)

Outcesticide 2022: Resurrection is a bootleg CD compilation, created by an unknown manufacturer, and sold online in extremely limited quantities in February 2022. The original release is housed in a CD jewel case, with information on the recordings within the CD compilation. Spanning the 18-track CD are selected live tracks from Nirvana concerts from 1989 to 1993 which weren't available in top-tier quality elsewhere, several alternate, unheard demos of songs, home demos, and previously unreleased rehearsal versions of songs, and compilation tracks. The CD is not related in any way to the Outcesticide series of the 1990s, and seems to only bear the name, in homage to the series itself. The CD was later released by the Japanese company Empress Valley Supreme Disc, also in 2022.

=== Outcesticide 2022: Resurrection ===
All songs written by Kurt Cobain except where noted.

No.	Title	Writer(s)	Length
1.	"Closing Time" (Studio Demo from 1993-01-21 "BMG Ariola, Rio De Janeiro, BR. Upgrade to previous version found on Outcesticide II.)	Cobain, Love, and Schemel	3:13
2.	"Mr. Moustache" (Live Soundboard recording from 1989-11-03 Tivoli, Utrecht, NL. Previously unavailable.)		3:44
3.	"Return Of The Rat" (Studio Alternate Mix/Instrumental from 1992-04-XX Laundry Room Studio, Seattle, WA session.)	Greg Sage	3:10
4.	"Where Did You Sleep Last Night?" (Live Soundboard from 1989-11-29. Previously unavailable.)	Traditional	4:10
5.	"Sappy" (1990-04-XX - Smart Studios (Mix 2) studio demo. Previously unavailable.)		3:44
6.	"Come As You Are" (Live Audience recording from 1991-09-16 Beehive Music & Video, Seattle, WA)		3:17
7.	"Frances Farmer Will Have Her Revenge On Seattle" (Alternate Mix/Instrumental from 1992-04-XX Laundry Room Studio, Seattle, WA.)		4:33
8.	"Rape Me" (Live Soundboard Recording from 1992-09-11 Seattle Center Coliseum, Seattle, WA.)		2:24
9.	"Lithium" (Studio recording from 1990-04-XX "Smart Studios, Madison, WI" (Mix 3). Previously unavailable.)		4:28
10.	"Sappy" (Studio outtake from Nevermind Session - 1991-05-XX Sound City Studios. Previously leaked in 2015.)		3:47
11.	"In Bloom" (live version from 1992-10-30 Estadio Jose Amalfitano, Buenos Aires, AR, from professional video source.)		4:59
12.	"Oh, Me" (Soundboard Rehearsal from 1993-11-18 "Sony Music Studios (MTV Unplugged), New York, NY. Previously unavailable.)	The Meat Puppets	3:24
13.	"The Money Will Roll Right In" (Live soundboard recording from 1992-07-02 Plaza de Toros de Valencia, Valencia, ES)	Fang	2:30
14.	"Old Age" (Home Demo, from 199X Cobain Residence. Previously available in trading circles.)		4:43
15.	"Serve The Servants" (Live soundboard recording from 1993-04-09 "Cow Palace, Daly City, CA. Previously unavailable.)		3:30
16.	"Lounge Act" (Studio Recording, alternate mix from 1991-05-XX "Sound City Studios. Originally leaked in 2015.)		2:38
17.	"The Man Who Sold The World" (Live soundboard recording, from 1993-12-30 Great Western Forum, Inglewood, CA, USA. Previously unavailable.)	David Bowie	4:28
18.	"Unknown Jam" (Live soundboard recording, from 1993-12-29 San Diego Sports Arena, San Diego, CA. Previously unavailable.)		7:57
Total length:			70:49

== A Season in Hell Part One ==
A Season in Hell Part One

Box set by Nirvana
- Released: 1994
- Recorded: 1988–1993
- Genres: Alternative rock, grunge
- Length: 218:07
- Label: Banzai

A Season in Hell Part One is a bootleg CD box set manufactured in Italy and released by Banzai in 1994. The collection is housed in a matte finish, square box that also includes a 7-inch×7″ booklet with 24 pages of photographs and information on the recordings featured in the set. Spanning the three disc, 66-track collection are two shows from 1990, several demos, some rare live material, various b-sides and compilation tracks. This is one of only two bootleg CD releases to feature the Off Ramp Café performance, and the only to feature the Town Pump show. A portion of the box set would later be officially released on With the Lights Out. In 1996, the inferior A Season In Hell Part Two was released by Razor's Edge, containing the 1994 Le Zénith show and an array of miscellaneous material, most of which was lifted from the Outcesticide series and official releases. A 1997 review stated "Nice 7" x 7" box with booklet. The Seattle gig features quite a few rarities and probably would have fared better as a single disc release. The Vancouver gig is nothing special and the rest of the set is made up of stuff found elsewhere with ease".

=== A Season in Hell Part One, CD 1 ===
All songs written by Kurt Cobain except where noted.

No.	Title	Writer(s)	Length
1.	"Aneurysm" (early version)	Cobain/Novoselic/Grohl	5:01
2.	"Oh, the Guilt" (early version)		3:27
3.	"Mr. Moustache"		3:26
4.	"Pay to Play"		3:31
5.	"Breed"		3:00
6.	"Floyd the Barber"		2:10
7.	"About a Girl"		3:38
8.	"Verse Chorus Verse"		3:20
9.	"In Bloom"		5:08
10.	"Swap Meet"		2:57
11.	"Been a Son"		2:10
12.	"Stain"		1:53
13.	"Blew"		4:07
14.	"Sappy"		3:37
15.	"Lithium"		3:54
16.	"School"		2:44
17.	"D-7" (originally performed by the Wipers)	Sage	4:42
18.	"Here She Comes Now" (originally performed by The Velvet Underground)	Reed	4:41
19.	"Sliver"		3:39
Total length:			66:57

- All tracks from an incomplete audience source recorded live at the Off Ramp Café in Seattle on November 25, 1990, and would be the ninth ever performance to feature Dave Grohl on drums. Missing the encore.

=== A Season in Hell Part One, CD 2 ===
All songs written by Kurt Cobain except where noted.

No.	Title	Writer(s)	Length
1.	"Love Buzz" (originally performed by Shocking Blue)	van Leeuwen	3:31
2.	"Floyd the Barber"		2:53
3.	"Scoff"		5:41
4.	"Dive"	Cobain/Novoselic	3:45
5.	"Spank Thru"		3:35
6.	"About a Girl"		2:44
7.	"Sappy"		3:00
8.	"School"		3:08
9.	"Breed"		3:36
10.	"Been a Son"		2:11
11.	"Stain"		2:43
12.	"Negative Creep"		2:40
13.	"Blew"		4:40
14.	"Beans"		1:24
15.	"Montage of Heck" (short version)		1:13
16.	"Spank Thru" (from Sub Pop 200)		3:21
17.	"About a Girl"		2:33
18.	"Mr. Moustache" (early version)		3:38
19.	"Sifting" (instrumental version)		5:28
20.	"Blew" (early version)		2:55
21.	"Do You Love Me?" (from Hard to Believe - originally performed by Kiss)	Stanley/Ezrin/Fowley	3:24
22.	"Been a Son"		2:20
23.	"Stain"		2:38
24.	"Even in His Youth"		3:15
Total length:			76:18

- Tracks 1–13 from a near complete audience source recorded live at the Town Pump, Vancouver, British Columbia, on March 12, 1990, just two months prior to the departure of drummer Chad Channing.
- Tracks 14 and 15 recorded on a 4-track at the Cobain residence, Olympia, Washington in 1988. "Beans" later appeared on With the Lights Out.
- Tracks 18–20 recorded summer 1988 at Reciprocal Recording, Seattle, Washington, with songs that appeared on the "Love Buzz" single.
- Track 21 recorded in 1989, released later in a Kiss Tribute Album Hard to Believe: A Kiss Covers Compilation
- Tracks 22–24 recorded at The Music Source in Seattle in September 1989. "Been a Son" and "Stain" appeared on the Blew EP. "Even in His Youth" later appeared on With the Lights Out.

=== A Season in Hell Part One, CD 3 ===
All songs written by Kurt Cobain except where noted.

No.	Title	Writer(s)	Length
1.	"Polly"		2:47
2.	"Help Me I'm Hungry"		2:41
3.	"Polly"		2:39
4.	"About a Girl" ("Sliver" b-side)		2:28
5.	"Spank Thru" ("Sliver" b-side)		2:59
6.	"Molly's Lips" (from The Fluid split single - originally performed by The Vaselines)	Kelly/McKee	2:00
7.	"D-7" (from Hormoaning - originally performed by the Wipers)	Sage	3:42
8.	"Aneurysm" ("Smells Like Teen Spirit" b-side)	Cobain/Novoselic/Grohl	4:48
9.	"Even in His Youth" ("Smells Like Teen Spirit" b-side)		3:04
10.	"Talk to Me"		3:05
11.	"Smells Like Teen Spirit"	Cobain/Novoselic/Grohl	3:08
12.	"Something in the Way"		3:15
13.	"Been a Son"		1:55
14.	"Smells Like Teen Spirit"	Cobain/Novoselic/Grohl	5:02
15.	"Territorial Pissings"		2:40
16.	"Return of the Rat" (from Eight Songs for Greg Sage and The Wipers - originally performed by the Wipers)	Sage	3:08
17.	"Curmudgeon" ("Lithium" b-side)		2:59
18.	"Oh, the Guilt" (from The Jesus Lizard split single)		3:23
19.	"Sappy" (from No Alternative)		3:25
20.	"I Hate Myself and Want to Die" (from The Beavis & Butt-Head Experience)		2:45
21.	"Marigold" ("Heart-Shaped Box" b-side)	Grohl	2:32
22.	"Moist Vagina" ("All Apologies"/"Rape Me" b-side)		3:34
23.	"Gallons of Rubbing Alcohol Flow Through the Strip"		7:31
Total length:			75:32

- Track 1 recorded at The Music Source in Seattle in September 1989 and later appeared on With the Lights Out.
- Track 2 from a soundboard source recorded live at U4 in Vienna, Austria on November 22, 1989.
- Tracks 3, 12 and 13 from BBC radio sessions recorded at Maida Vale Studios in London in 1989 and 1991. "Been a Son" appeared on Incesticide.
- Tracks 4–6 from a soundboard source recorded live at the Pine Street Theatre in Portland, Oregon, on February 9, 1990. The complete show would later be released as a bonus to the reissue of Bleach in 2009.
- Track 10 from an audience source recorded live at Bloom in Mezzago, Italy, on November 17, 1991.
- Track 11 recorded for Top of the Pops at BBC Elstree Centre in Hertfordshire, England, on November 28, 1991, and appeared on Live! Tonight! Sold Out!!.
- Tracks 14 and 15 recorded for Saturday Night Live at NBC Studios in New York City on January 11, 1992.
- Track 23 appeared as a bonus on non-US pressings of In Utero.
- The third disc of this collection is the least significant since the majority of the tracks are taken from b-sides of singles and compilation appearances. The release of With the Lights Out further denotes the importance of this disc, though it does still contain some unreleased material and even had some stolen by Blue Moon Records for its Outcesticide series.

== Into the Black ==
Into the Black

Box set by Nirvana
- Released: 1994
- Recorded: 1988–1994
- Genres: Alternative rock, grunge
- Length: 415:06
- Label: Tribute

Into the Black is a six CD box set released by Tribute in 1994, which is often considered the preferred Nirvana bootleg box set due to it being compiled by a knowledgeable fan. It is housed in a glossy box, including a 22-page booklet made of thick cardstock. Several recordings were obtained specifically for the set and it contains a large amount of material that had not yet surfaced up to the time of its release. The extensive 116-track collection includes demo recordings, two band-made compilations, the 1992 Reading Festival performance and BBC radio sessions from Maida Vale Studios. The set also contains two Seattle shows; the 1991 Halloween homecoming performance for their North American Nevermind tour, and their last ever American show in 1994. Following Into the Black, Tribute released the 2-CD companion piece, New Year's Eve, featuring Nirvana's 1993 performance at the Oakland Coliseum as well as the 1988 Sub Pop 200 record release show in Seattle. A 1997 review stated "If you want to start a collection, here's the place to start. A superb piece of packaging including a great colour booklet in an oblong box. Much of the material featured here, which is all excellent quality, is now out on single discs and more cost effective. However, this is the only place to find the last US show. The bottom line".

=== Ultra Rare Demos & Sessions ===
All songs written by Kurt Cobain except where noted.

No.	Title	Writer(s)	Length
1.	"If You Must"		3:54
2.	"Downer"	Cobain/Novoselic	1:34
3.	"Floyd the Barber"		2:07
4.	"Paper Cuts"		3:49
5.	"Spank Thru"		3:18
6.	"Beeswax"		2:33
7.	"Pen Cap Chew"		2:47
8.	"Beans"		1:18
9.	"Hairspray Queen"		4:05
10.	"Lithium"		4:04
11.	"Sappy"		3:15
12.	"Polly" (original mix)		2:42
13.	"Son of a Gun" (originally performed by The Vaselines)	Kelly/McKee	2:46
14.	"Dive"	Cobain/Novoselic	3:44
15.	"About a Girl"		2:37
16.	"Opinion" (includes interview with Calvin Johnson)		2:45
17.	"(New Wave) Polly"	Cobain/Novoselic/Grohl	1:48
18.	"Aneurysm"	Cobain/Novoselic/Grohl	4:36
19.	"Something in the Way"		3:14
20.	"Been a Son"		1:52
21.	"Polly"		2:33
22.	"Smells Like Teen Spirit"	Cobain/Novoselic/Grohl	4:34
23.	"Territorial Pissings"		2:40
Total length:			68:36

- Tracks 1–7 and 9 recorded at Reciprocal Recording in Seattle on January 23, 1988. "Spank Thru" remains unreleased.
- Tracks 10–12 recorded at Smart Studios in Madison, Wisconsin, in April 1990 and are sourced from the 7-inch vinyl bootleg Total Fucking Godhead. "Sappy" and "Polly" can be found on Master Demo Recordings in better quality.
- Tracks 14 and 15 recorded for Nozems-a-Gogo on VPRO radio at Villa 65, Hilversum, Netherlands, on November 1, 1989.
- Track 16 recorded for Boy Meets Girl on KAOS radio at The Evergreen State College in Olympia, Washington, on September 25, 1990, and later appeared without the interview on With the Lights Out.
- Tracks 17–20 from the BBC radio session recorded at Maida Vale Studios in London on November 9, 1991, sourced from the 7-inch vinyl bootleg Smells Like Nirvana.
- Tracks 21–23 recorded live at MTV Studios in New York City on January 10, 1992.

=== Master Demo Recordings ===
All songs written by Kurt Cobain except where noted.

No.	Title	Writer(s)	Length
1.	"Aero Zeppelin"		4:31
2.	"Escalator to Hell" (short version)		0:39
3.	"Beeswax"		2:51
4.	"Mexican Seafood"		2:04
5.	"Pen Cap Chew"		2:59
6.	"Mr. Moustache" (early version)		3:37
7.	"Blandest"		4:03
8.	"Downer"	Cobain/Novoselic	1:41
9.	"Floyd the Barber" (original mix)		2:16
10.	"Paper Cuts" (original mix)		4:03
11.	"Spank Thru"		3:28
12.	"Sifting" (instrumental version)		5:23
13.	"In Bloom"		4:29
14.	"Breed"		3:14
15.	"Pay to Play"		3:31
16.	"Polly" (original mix)		2:52
17.	"Dive" (original mix)	Cobain/Novoselic	3:59
18.	"Lithium" (mix 6)		4:27
19.	"Sappy"		3:26
Total length:			63:31

- Tracks 1–12 from a band made compilation of songs from two Reciprocal Recording sessions on January 23, 1988, and summer 1988, with the exception of "Escalator to Hell" which was recorded on a 4-track at the Cobain residence in 1988. "Escalator to Hell", "Mr. Moustache", "Spank Thru" and "Sifting" remain unreleased.
- Tracks 13–19 recorded at Smart Studios in Madison, Wisconsin, in April 1990. They were taken from a cassette Nirvana was sending to record labels in 1990 after the original intention for release as the second Sub Pop album was scrapped.

=== Paramount Theatre ===
All songs written by Kurt Cobain except where noted.

No.	Title	Writer(s)	Length
1.	"Jesus Doesn't Want Me for a Sunbeam" (originally performed by The Vaselines)	Kelly/McKee	3:53
2.	"Aneurysm"	Cobain/Novoselic/Grohl	4:56
3.	"Drain You" "School"		7:08
4.	"Floyd the Barber"		3:12
5.	"Smells Like Teen Spirit"	Cobain/Novoselic/Grohl	4:52
6.	"About a Girl"		3:08
7.	"Polly"		3:04
8.	"Breed"		3:35
9.	"Sliver"	Cobain/Novoselic	2:24
10.	"Love Buzz" (originally performed by Shocking Blue)	van Leeuwen	3:38
11.	"Lithium"		4:46
12.	"Been a Son"		2:16
13.	"Negative Creep"		2:48
14.	"On a Plain"		3:08
15.	"Blew"		7:22
16.	"Rape Me" (early version)		2:54
17.	"Territorial Pissings"		2:46
18.	"Endless, Nameless"		6:23
Total length:			72:12

- All tracks from a near complete soundboard source recorded live on October 31, 1991, at the Paramount Theatre in Seattle. "Jesus Doesn't Want Me for a Sunbeam" was later featured on the DVD portion of With the Lights Out. "Drain You" and "School" were issued as b-sides to the "Come As You Are" single. "About a Girl", "Polly", "Breed" and portions of "Endless, Nameless" later appeared on Live! Tonight! Sold Out!!. "Been a Son" was issued as a b-side to the "Lithium" single. "Negative Creep" was later included on From the Muddy Banks of the Wishkah. Several songs from this performance were also featured on Nevermind It's an Interview. Live at the Paramount, the official blu-ray release of the complete show, rendered this disc obsolete in 2011.

=== Reading Festival ===
All songs written by Kurt Cobain except where noted.

No.	Title	Writer(s)	Length
1.	"Breed"		3:28
2.	"Drain You"		3:55
3.	"Aneurysm"	Cobain/Novoselic/Grohl	4:36
4.	"School"		3:13
5.	"Sliver"		2:15
6.	"In Bloom"		4:34
7.	"Come as You Are"		3:35
8.	"Lithium"		4:40
9.	"Smells Like Teen Spirit"	Cobain/Novoselic/Grohl	5:54
10.	"On a Plain"		3:01
11.	"Negative Creep"		2:55
12.	"Been a Son"		3:01
13.	"All Apologies" (early version)		3:23
14.	"Dumb" (early version)		2:33
15.	"Stay Away"		3:37
16.	"Territorial Pissings"		2:51
17.	"Smells Like Teen Spirit"	Cobain/Novoselic/Grohl	4:51
18.	"Territorial Pissings"		2:46
Total length:			65:07

- Tracks 1–16 from an incomplete soundboard source recorded August 30, 1992, at the Reading Festival in England, taken from the second FM broadcast. Although many bootleg CDs feature this performance, they have become somewhat obsolete since the release of Live at Reading. However, most bootleg CD releases maintain better continuity as compared to the official release CD version, which despite maintaining a more complete set list, was heavily edited due to time restraints.
- Tracks 17 and 18 recorded for Saturday Night Live at NBC Studios in New York City on January 11, 1992.

=== Last American Show Part 1 ===
All songs written by Kurt Cobain except where noted.

No.	Title	Writer(s)	Length
1.	"Radio Friendly Unit Shifter"		5:17
2.	"Drain You"		4:10
3.	"Breed"		3:20
4.	"Serve the Servants"		3:50
5.	"Come as You Are"		3:24
6.	"Smells Like Teen Spirit"	Cobain/Novoselic/Grohl	4:35
7.	"Sliver"		2:22
8.	"Dumb"		2:52
9.	"In Bloom"		4:18
10.	"About a Girl"		2:50
11.	"Lithium"		4:34
12.	"Pennyroyal Tea"		3:51
13.	"School"		3:00
14.	"Polly"		3:25
15.	"Frances Farmer Will Have Her Revenge on Seattle"		3:53
16.	"Milk It"		3:46
17.	"Rape Me"		2:45
18.	"Territorial Pissings"		6:30
19.	"Jesus Doesn't Want Me for a Sunbeam" (originally performed by The Vaselines)	Kelly/McKee	3:58
Total length:			72:39

- All tracks from a complete audience source recorded live at the Seattle Center Arena in Seattle on January 8, 1994, with the six final tracks of the performance featured on Last American Show Part 2.

=== Last American Show Part 2 ===
All songs written by Kurt Cobain except where noted.

No.	Title	Writer(s)	Length
1.	"The Man Who Sold the World" (originally performed by David Bowie)	Bowie	5:33
2.	"All Apologies"		3:47
3.	"Scentless Apprentice"	Cobain/Novoselic/Grohl	3:52
4.	"On a Plain"		3:20
5.	"Heart-Shaped Box"		5:26
6.	"Blew"		7:26
7.	"Love Buzz" (originally performed by Shocking Blue)	van Leewen	3:19
8.	"About a Girl"		2:41
9.	"Polly"		2:38
10.	"Spank Thru"		3:17
11.	"Son of a Gun" (originally performed by The Vaselines)	Kelly/McKee	2:48
12.	"Molly's Lips" (originally performed by The Vaselines)	Kelly/McKee	1:50
13.	"D-7" (originally performed by the Wipers)	Sage	3:46
14.	"Turnaround" (originally performed by Devo)	Mothersbaugh/Casale	2:17
15.	"Dumb"		2:36
16.	"Drain You"		4:03
17.	"Endless, Nameless"		6:21
18.	"Endless, Nameless" (continued)		2:23
19.	"Courtney Love's Complete Eulogy"	Love	6:20
Total length:			73:41

- Tracks 1–6 from a complete audience source recorded live at the Seattle Center Arena in Seattle on January 8, 1994, with the first nineteen tracks of the performance featured on Last American Show Part 1.
- Tracks 7–18 from BBC radio sessions recorded in 1989 and 1991 at Maida Vale Studios in London. The disc is defective, which causes some of the tracks to not play properly. The Complete Radio Sessions on Blue Moon Records and The Eternal Legacy released by Kiss the Stone both contain error free versions of these sessions. "Love Buzz", "About a Girl", "Polly", and "Spank Thru" remain unreleased.
- Track 19 is Courtney Love's complete eulogy for Kurt Cobain recorded at the Seattle Center Flag Pavilion on April 10, 1994.

== The Chosen Rejects ==
The Chosen Rejects

Box set by Nirvana
- Released: November 1, 2006
- Recorded: 1985–1994
- Length: 312:18
- Producer: John W. Busher

The Chosen Rejects is a bootleg CD box set put together by John W. Busher in Italy and released November 1, 2006. The set is enclosed in 4 standard jewel cases, each of which have a separate title and cover image. Each CD also came with a track listing on the inside of the cover. This 4 disc box set holds an 80-track collection that are of soundboard quality except for track 15 on disc one, which is a boombox demo, and tracks 4–5, 7, 13–15, 19-20 on disc 4, which were recorded by audience members. The first disc also features 7 Fecal Matter demos, from the album Illiteracy Will Prevail. The bootleg was originally for sale on Discogs, however a copy has not been put up for sale since 2012, and probably never will be again due to their crackdown on sales of bootlegs.

=== The Chosen Rejects, CD 1, Home Demos ===
No.	Title	Length
1.	"Montage Of Heck (Short)"	6:27
2.	"Sounds of Dentage"	4:35
3.	"Bambi Slaughter"	3:17
4.	"Laminated Effect"	2:08
5.	"Insurance"	1:33
6.	"Class Of '86"	4:20
7.	"Blather's Log"	2:32
8.	"Downer"	3:04
9.	"Escalator To Hell" (Kurt Cobain played his guitar, recorded it backwards, and then reversed the tape.)	1:53
10.	"Sappy"	2:24
11.	"Creation"	1:30
12.	"Black & White Blues"	2:02
13.	"Intro/Old Age/Low Rider"	6:23
14.	"Montage Of Heck (Long)"	33:23
15.	"Gypsies, Tramps & Thieves"	2:27
Total length:		77:58

- Tracks 2–8 are Fecal Matter demos, recorded in 1985.
- Track 9 is a 4-Track demo from 1987.
- Tracks 10–12 are 4-Track demos recorded in 1988.
- Tracks 1 and 14 are 4-Track tape collages created in 1988 that contain random snippets of sounds and clips.
- Track 13 is a 4-Track demo from 1992.
- Track 15 is from a band practice in 1987 and is a cover of a Cher song of the same name.

=== The Chosen Rejects, CD 2, Studio Sessions ===
No.	Title	Length
1.	"Spank Thru"	3:34
2.	"Paper Cuts"	4:13
3.	"Mr. Moustache"	3:43
4.	"Blew"	2:58
5.	"Sifting"	5:41
6.	"Ain't It A Shame"	2:04
7.	"Even In His Youth"	3:09
8.	"Lithium"	4:32
9.	"Breed"	3:17
10.	"Sappy"	3:34
11.	"Aneurysm"	5:07
12.	"Oh, The Guilt"	3:17
13.	"Radio Friendly Unit Shifter"	3:10
14.	"On A Plain"	3:35
15.	"All Apologies"	4:18
16.	"Token Eastern Song"	4:01
17.	"Something In The Way"	3:54
18.	"Drain You"	3:43
19.	"Stay Away"	3:29
20.	"Scentless Apprentice"	4:00
21.	"Onwards Into Countless Battles"	1:19
22.	"Very Ape"	2:22
Total length:		79:00

- Track 1 is a demo recorded at Reciprocal Recording in Seattle on January 23, 1988.
- Track 2 is a rough mix recorded at Reciprocal Recording on January 23, 1988.
- Tracks 3–5 are demos recorded at Reciprocal Recording on June 11, 1988.
- Track 6 is a rough mix of a demo recorded at Reciprocal Recording on August 20–28, 1989.
- Track 7 is a rough mix of a demo recorded at the Music Source studios in Seattle in September 1989.
- Tracks 8–10 are demos recorded at Smart Studios in Madison, Wisconsin, on April 2–6, 1990.The same song can be found on Master Demo Recordings from the Into the Black box set.
- Tracks 11 is a rough mix recorded at the Music Source studios in Seattle on January 1, 1991.
- Tracks 12–16 are demos recorded at the Music Source studios in Seattle on January 1, 1991.
- Tracks 17–19 are rough mixes of the versions that will appear on Nevermind.
- Track 20–22 are demos recorded at the BMG Ariola studios, Rio de Janeiro on January 19, 1993. "Onwards Into Countless Battles" is a cover of the band Unleashed and is titled "Dave's meat song" in the booklet of the box set With the Lights Out.

=== The Chosen Rejects, CD 3, Broadcasts ===
No.	Title	Length
1.	"Floyd The Barber"	2:33
2.	"Mexican Seafood"	2:08
3.	"Hairspray Queen"	4:47
4.	"Dive"	4:04
5.	"About A Girl"	2:43
6.	"Love Buzz"	3:21
7.	"Polly"	2:42
8.	"Spank Thru"	3:19
9.	"Drain You"	4:05
10.	"Something In The Way"	3:25
11.	"Where Did You Sleep Last Night?"	5:28
12.	"Here She Comes Now"	5:00
13.	"Smells Like Teen Spirit"	4:57
14.	"School"	2:38
15.	"Molly's Lips"	1:52
16.	"Lithium"	5:10
17.	"Heart-Shaped Box"	4:53
18.	"Rape Me"	2:50
19.	"Pennyroyal Tea"	3:33
20.	"Serve The Servants"	3:24
21.	"Dumb"	2:33
22.	"Territorial Pissings"	2:47
Total length:		78:12

- Tracks 1–3 were performed in 1987 at KAOS FM radio.
- Track 4 was performed at VPRO FM on November 1, 1989.
- Tracks 5–8 were performed at BBC FM October 26, 1989.
- Track 9 was performed September 3, 1991, at the BBC.
- Track 10 was performed November 9, 1991.
- Tracks 11, 12 were performed on November 25, 1991, at VPRO FM.
- Track 13 was performed on SNL on January 11, 1992.
- Track 14 and 15 was performed at MTV on January 10, 1992.
- Track 16 was also performed at MTV but on September 9, 1992.
- Track 17 was performed on SNL September 25, 1993.
- Tracks 18 and 19 were performed February 4, 1994, at the Canal.
- Tracks 20 and 21 were performed at the Tunnel on February 23, 1994.
- Track 22 was performed on SNL on January 11, 1992.

=== The Chosen Rejects, CD 4, Live Rarities ===
No.	Title	Length
1.	"If You Must"	3:56
2.	"Pen Cap Chew"	4:21
3.	"Big Cheese"	3:45
4.	"Run Rabbit Run"	2:08
5.	"Sifting"	5:25
6.	"Token Eastern Song"	3:13
7.	"Son Of A Gun"	2:39
8.	"Oh, The Guilt"	3:28
9.	"Mr. Moustache"	3:21
10.	"Verse Chorus Verse"	3:01
11.	"Stain"	1:54
12.	"Rape Me"	2:44
13.	"Curmudgeon"	2:59
14.	"Talk To Me"	3:21
15.	"Where Did You Sleep Last Night?"	6:35
16.	"Swap Meet"	3:10
17.	"Scoff"	4:02
18.	"Beeswax"	2:58
19.	"You Know You're Right"	5:31
20.	"The Man Who Sold The World"	4:54
21.	"Erectum/Moby Dick"	3:43
Total length:		77:08

- Tracks 1–3 and 21 are from a soundboard source recorded live at Tacoma on March 19, 1988.
- Track 4 is a The Smack cover from an audience source recorded live at Olympia on October 30, 1988.
- Track 5 is from an audience source recorded live at Seattle on December 28, 1988.
- Track 6 is from a soundboard source recorded live at Omaha on October 8, 1989.
- Track 7 is from an audience source recorded live at Birmingham on October 23, 1990.
- Tracks 8–11 are from a soundboard source recorded live at Seattle on November 2, 1990.
- Track 12 is from a soundboard source recorded live at Rome on November 19, 1991.
- Track 13 is from an audience source recorded live at Tempe on October 23, 1991.
- Track 15 is from a soundboard source recorded live at Mezzago on November 17, 1991.
- Tracks 16–17 are from a soundboard source recorded live at Roskilde on May 26, 1992.
- Track 18 is from a soundboard source recorded live at Buenos Aires on October 30, 1992.
- Track 19 is from an audience source recorded live at Chicago on October 23, 1993.
- Track 20 is from an audience source recorded live at Seattle on January 8, 1994 (Nirvana's final U.S. show).

== Charted bootlegs ==
=== Albums ===
Album	Year	Peak chart position
Album	Year	ITA Vinyls
Live on KAOS-FM Seattle-1987 Label: Independent	2016	9

=== Singles ===
Single	Year	Peak chart position
Single	Year	UK Physical
Live at Tunnel Rome Italy 23 Feb 1994 "Serve the Servants" (live) and "Dumb" (live) Label: Mind Control	2025	93

=== Video albums ===
Album	Year	Peak chart position	
Album	Year	UK Music Videos	ITA DVDs
At Reading Festival Label: Intergroove	2008	30	—
In Performance Label: Classic Rock	2015	—	11

== Bibliography ==
- The Bleach Boys (1997). Nirvana: The Alternative CD & Vinyl Collectors Guide. Great Britain.
