= Do Re Mi (Nirvana song) =

Unfinished Nirvana song released in 2004

Song by Nirvana

from the album With the Lights Out
- Released: November 23, 2004
- Recorded: March 1994
- Length: 4:24 (Sliver: The Best of the Box); 10:11 (Montage of Heck: The Home Recordings)
- Label: DGC
- Songwriter: Kurt Cobain
- Producer: Kurt Cobain

"Do Re Mi" is a song by American rock band Nirvana, written by vocalist and guitarist, Kurt Cobain. It first appeared on the band's rarities box set, With the Lights Out, released in November 2004. A second version appears on the deluxe edition of Montage of Heck: The Home Recordings, released in November 2015.

== Origin and release ==
Originally titled "Dough, Ray and Me" and then "Me and my IV", the song officially released as "Do Re Mi" is one of the last-known Cobain compositions. Cobain's widow, Courtney Love, began mentioning the song in interviews shortly after Cobain's death in April 1994, naming it as one of his "three completed, finished" unrecorded songs, along with "Opinion" and "Talk to Me". In a 1994 Rolling Stone interview, she told interviewer David Fricke:

"The third one, I can't sing. It's too fucking good. Every part of it is really catchy. He was calling it 'Dough, Ray and Me.' I thought it was a little corny. It was the last thing he wrote on our bed. The chorus was 'Dough, Ray and me/Dough, Ray and me,' and then it was 'Me and my IV.' I had asked him after [Cobain's suicide attempt in Rome, Italy] to freeze his sperm. So there's this whole thing about freezing your uterus."

In 2002, Jim DeRogatis was allowed to listen to the song and other unreleased recordings at Love's home; he described the "solo acoustic demo taped in [Cobain's] bedroom" as boasting "a beautiful, Beatlesesque melody in the tradition of 'About a Girl,' the standout track from 'Bleach.' In addition to an endearingly rough guitar solo, its other outstanding feature is the moaned/whined/chanted repetition of 'Dough/Ray/Me, Do/Re/Mi' over and over during a long and climactic finale". DeRogatis wrote that a four-track version of the song was also in existence, featuring Cobain on drums and vocals, Nirvana second guitarist Pat Smear on guitar, and Hole guitarist Eric Erlandson on bass.

The solo acoustic demo of the song was released, under the title "Do Re Mi", on the band's rarities box set, With the Lights Out, in November 2004. The same version was re-released on the band's compilation album Sliver: The Best of the Box in November 2005.

A medley of previously unreleased demo versions, over 10 minutes long, appears on the deluxe edition of Montage of Heck: The Home Recordings, released in November 2015.

To date, no version of the song featuring the re-written "Me and my IV" lyrics has been released.

== Reception ==
Dan Weiss of Spin described "Do Re Mi" as Cobain's "best posthumously released song—take that 'You Know You're Right.'" Collin Brennan of Consequence of Sound called it "the finest Cobain composition that never saw the light of day during his lifetime" and wrote, "If Paul McCartney was born a few decades later and opted for dirty flannel instead of a moptop, this is the kind of tune he might have spawned."

== Recording and release history ==
| Date recorded | Studio | Producer/recorder | Releases | Personnel |
|---|---|---|---|---|
| Early 1994 | Cobain residence, Seattle | Kurt Cobain | Montage of Heck: The Home Recordings (2015) | Kurt Cobain - vocals, guitar |
| Early 1994 | Bedroom, Cobain residence, Seattle | Kurt Cobain | With the Lights Out (2004); Sliver: The Best of the Box (2005) | Kurt Cobain - vocals, guitar |
| March 1994 | Basement, Cobain residence, Seattle | Kurt Cobain | Unreleased | Kurt Cobain - vocals, drums; Eric Erlandson - bass; Pat Smear - guitar |
| March 25, 1994 | Basement, Cobain residence, Seattle | Kurt Cobain | Unreleased | Kurt Cobain - vocals, guitar; Pat Smear - guitar |
