= Talk to Me (Nirvana song) =

Song by Nirvana

from the album With the Lights Out
- Released: November 23, 2004
- Genre: Grunge; alternative rock
- Length: 3:35
- Label: DGC
- Composer: Kurt Cobain
- Lyricist: Kurt Cobain

Talk to Me is a song by the American rock band Nirvana, written by vocalist and guitarist Kurt Cobain.

The song was performed several times live in 1991 and 1992, but is not known to have been recorded in the studio. Its first official release was in November 2004, when a live version from the Crocodile Cafe in Seattle, Washington on October 4, 1992 appeared on the DVD of the band's rarities box set, With the Lights Out.

== Background and recording ==
"Talk to Me" was first performed live on November 16, 1991 at Teatro Verdi in Muggia, Italy. The first and most heavily bootlegged version was recorded the following night, at Bloom in Mezzago, Italy. This version first appeared on the 1995 bootleg, Outcesticide: In Memory of Kurt Cobain. The only version to be officially released was recorded live at the Crocodile Cafe in Seattle, Washington on October 4, 1992, and appeared on the DVD of the band's rarities box set, With the Lights Out, in November 2004. This was the final live performance of the song.

In August 1993, the American rock band Hole, fronted by Cobain's wife Courtney Love, recorded a studio version of "Talk to Me" at Hanzek Audio in Seattle during early sessions for the band's second studio album, Live Through This. However, this version was never completed and remains unreleased.

Following Cobain's death in April 1994, Love mentioned the song by name in a September 1995 MTV interview, telling interviewer Kurt Loder that she was going to donate it to one of Cobain's musical idols, Iggy Pop, for him to record. It remains unclear what recording of "Talk to Me" Love planned to give to Pop, although she referred to the song as being "on the Italian bootleg," suggesting one of the two first performances. Pop declined Love's offer, explaining in a 2002 interview with The Big Takeover that he had his own material and liked but had "no interest in doing Kurt’s music."

For years a demo version of the song by Cobain was rumored to exist, but not confirmed. Then, in 2016, it was confirmed that a tape in the Nirvana vault exists which includes two previously unreleased "practice" and "audience" versions of "Talk to Me", a 12-minute version of the song "Opinion" along with the acoustic demo of "You Know You're Right" that was included on the With the Lights Out box set.

== Composition ==
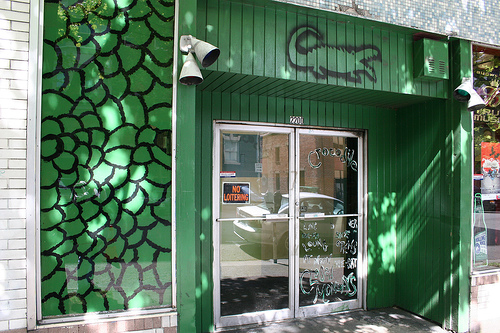
The Crocodile Cafe, Seattle where Nirvana made their final live performance of "Talk to Me" in 1992 under the band name of Pen Cap Chew as the surprise support act for Mudhoney.

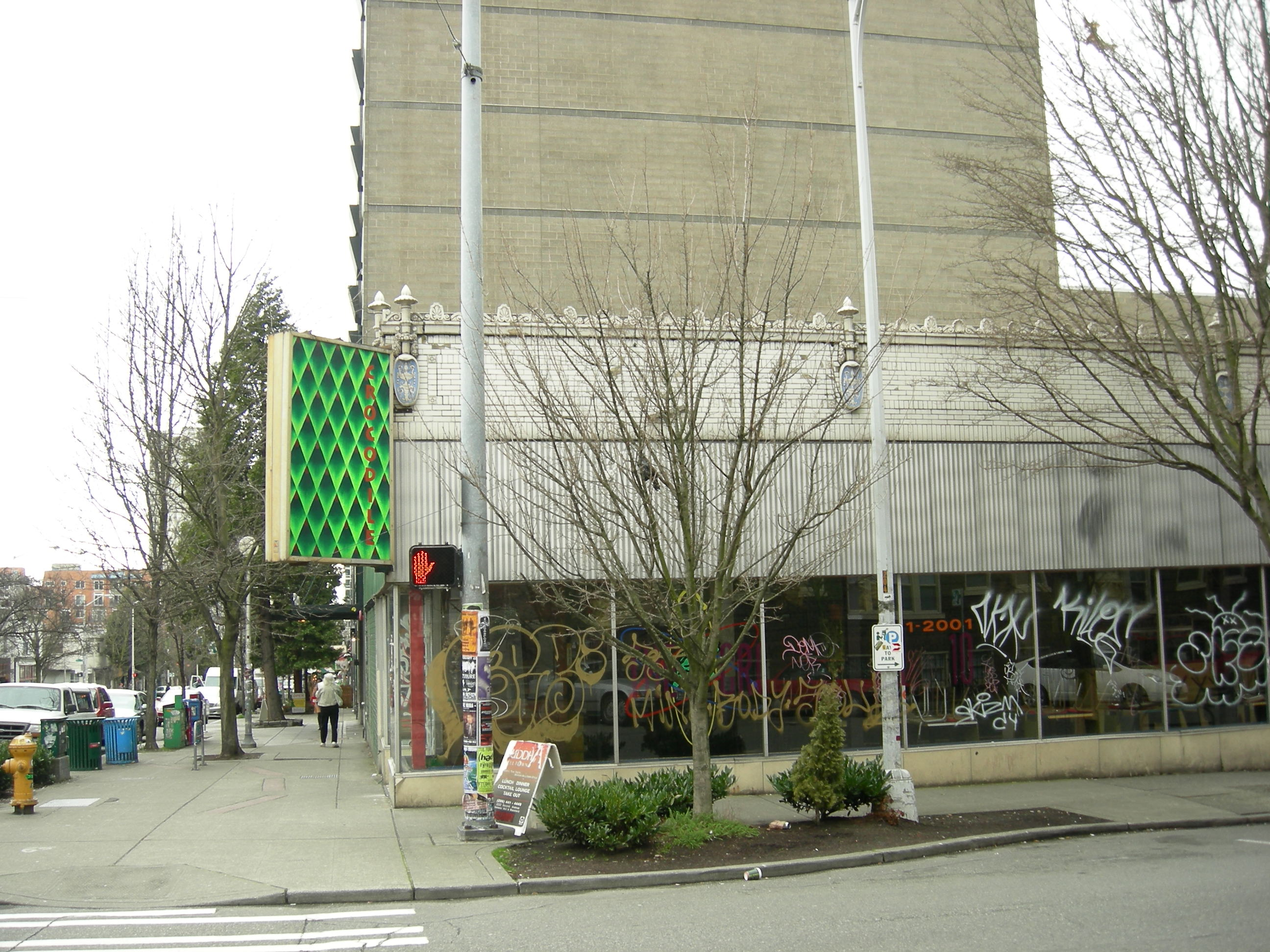
The Crocodile Cafe

"Talk to Me"
A 24-second sample of the song's first pre-chorus. "Talk to Me" features a recurring drum fill and at its center is a jerky rhythm which is a testament to Cobain’s love of new wave bands.

"Talk to Me" is an alternative rock song that lasts for a duration of three minutes and thirty-five seconds. The song has a "jerky rhythm" and features a recurring drum fill in addition to a guitar solo. The song has been cited as evidence of the influence of new wave bands such as Devo and Oingo Boingo on Cobain's songwriting.

Rolling Stone writer Richard Bienstock wrote that the song's drums resembled those of "Get Off of My Cloud" by the Rolling Stones.

== Reception ==
In 2015, Rolling Stone placed "Talk to Me" at number 70 on their No Apologies: All 102 Nirvana Songs Ranked list. In 2019, it was again ranked at number 70 in the NME's Every Nirvana song ranked in order of greatness list, with Tom Howard declaring that "it could have been a contender".

== Accolades ==
Year	Publication	Country	Accolade	Rank
2019	NME	United Kingdom	Every Nirvana song ranked in order of greatness	70

== Recording and release history ==
=== Demo and studio versions ===
Date recorded	Studio/venue	Releases	Personnel
1994	Cobain residence (practice take)	Unreleased	Kurt Cobain (vocals, guitar)
1994	Cobain residence (audience take)	Unreleased	Kurt Cobain (vocals, guitar)

=== Live versions ===
Date recorded	Venue	Releases	Personnel
November 16, 1991	Teatro Verdi, Muggia, Italy	Unreleased	Kurt Cobain (vocals, guitar); Krist Novoselic (bass); Dave Grohl (drums)
November 17, 1991	Bloom, Mezzago, Italy	Outcesticide: In Memory of Kurt Cobain (1995)	Kurt Cobain (vocals, guitar); Krist Novoselic (bass); Dave Grohl (drums)
November 23, 1991	Vooruit, Ghent, Belgium	Unreleased	Kurt Cobain (vocals, guitar); Krist Novoselic (bass); Dave Grohl (drums)
November 26, 1991	Communal Building, University of Bradford, Bradford, United Kingdom	Unreleased	Kurt Cobain (vocals, guitar); Krist Novoselic (bass); Dave Grohl (drums)
October 4, 1992	The Crocodile Cafe, Seattle, Washington	With the Lights Out (2004)	Kurt Cobain (vocals, guitar); Krist Novoselic (bass); Dave Grohl (drums)
