= Opinion (song) =

Song by Nirvana

from the album With the Lights Out
- Released: November 23, 2004
- Genre: Alternative rock
- Length: 1:34
- Label: DGC
- Composer: Kurt Cobain
- Lyricist: Kurt Cobain

"Opinion" is a song by the American rock band Nirvana, written by vocalist and guitarist, Kurt Cobain. Never performed in concert and not confirmed to have been recorded in the studio, the song was initially survived only by a heavily-bootlegged solo acoustic version, recorded by Cobain during his appearance on the KAOS (FM) Boy Meets Girl radio show on September 25, 1990. In 2015, a brief clip of a second version, believed to be a demo, appeared in the Cobain documentary Montage of Heck, directed by Brett Morgan. The full clip of this version appeared online in April 2024.

The song was first officially released in November 2004, when the Boy Meets Girl version appeared on the band's rarities box set, With the Lights Out.

== Background ==
The version of "Opinion" that appeared in the film Kurt Cobain: Montage of Heck but that did not appear on the soundtrack for the film, Montage of Heck: The Home Recordings

"Opinion" was the first of several songs performed by Cobain during his appearance on the KAOS (FM) Boy Meets Girl radio show, hosted by Beat Happening vocalist and guitarist Calvin Johnson, at Evergreen State College in Olympia, Washington on September 25, 1990. This version began appearing on Nirvana bootlegs as early as the mid-'90s, such as the 1995 release, Outcesticide: In Memory of Kurt Cobain. A more complete version of the radio session, which also included Cobain's conversation with Johnson before and after the song, as well as a version of the future-Nevermind song "Lithium," was also available in the Nirvana trading community. In November 2004, both "Opinion" and "Lithium," as well as "Been a Son" from the same appearance, were officially released on the rarities box set, With the Lights Out. The full session also included versions of "Dumb" and "Polly," as well as a duet with Johnson on "D-7," originally by American rock band Wipers. Of all the songs performed during the session, only "Opinion" was never performed live, or recorded in the studio and officially released during the band's lifetime.

During Cobain's conversation with Johnson, he claimed that he had written most of the lyrics to "Opinion" earlier that day, joking that he had done so while driving to the studio with one foot. After the song, he asked if Johnson thought it sounded like "Taxman" by the Beatles. This dialogue was omitted from With the Lights Out, but parts of it appear in Montage of Heck.

After Cobain's death in April 1994, his widow, Courtney Love, began mentioning the song in interviews, saying she would donate it to Cobain's friend Mark Lanegan, lead singer of the Seattle band Screaming Trees, while giving another Nirvana rarity, "Talk to Me," to Iggy Pop. No version of "Opinion" by Lanegan is known to exist. Love occasionally referred to the song as "Opinions" in these interviews, the official BMI listing of the song.

According to Jim Griffin, an ex-employee of Nirvana's record label, Geffen Records, an electric version of "Opinion" was recorded by Nirvana in the studio.

In 2015, a brief clip of a second recording of "Opinion" appeared in Montage of Heck. Shortly after the film's release, Morgan tweeted that he was “listening to a mind blowing 12-minute acoustic Cobain unheard track" that he planned to include in the film's soundtrack, Montage of Heck: The Home Recordings, which he later confirmed was "Opinion". It was later confirmed that the tape with this recording also includes two previously unreleased, "practice" and "audience", versions of "Talk to Me", along with the acoustic demo of "You Know You're Right" that was included on the With the Lights Out box set.

== Composition ==
"Opinion"
A 17-second sample of the song's first verse and refrain. The rough, grainy demo recording has Cobain's lone voice singing melodies accompanied by driving acoustic guitar. Lyrically, "Opinion" is cynical rant about sensationalist media.

"Opinion" is an alternative rock song that runs for a duration of one minute and thirty-four seconds. The musical composition is rough, solo acoustic demo recording. It is a solo number that features Cobain's lone voice accompanied by driving acoustic guitar. The track is grainy and quiet, featuring an incensed Cobain singing melodies with a snarling delivery in a cracking voice over strums. The song is built around a repeating four-chord progression that carries throughout both its verses and choruses.

Lyrically, "Opinion" is a cynical diatribe about sensationalist media. Cobain rails against both lazy writing as well as the negativity that seems to be constant in the media. The song has barbed lyrics aimed at the media with lines such as, “Congratulations you have won / it's a year's subscription of bad puns / and a make-shift story of concern / and to set it off before it burns.”

== Critical reception ==
Describing it as an "acoustic rough," Raou Hernandez of The Austin Chronicle characterized "Opinion" as "a Cobain snark." Spin's Will Hermes called the unknown acoustic demo "brilliant." Writing for the same publication, Jim DeRogatis described the song as "an angry, acoustic diatribe against a sensationalistic media" and noted that the lyrics seem prescient." Ryan Reed from Ultimate Classic Rock said, "the song shows promise — hinting to the four-chord triumphs he'd perfect soon after." Larry Bartleet for NME said, "... the grainy recording of his voice cracking doesn't hide the potential of this song." Andrew Sacher from BrooklynVegan stated, "It's just Kurt and a guitar, and it's just a minute and a half long, but that's all Kurt needed for the magic to come through. Lyrically cynical and melodically beautiful, it holds its own against a large handful of Nirvana's properly recorded songs. ... Nirvana may be best known for being loud and heavy, but they were just as good at soft, quiet music and "Opinion" one of the finest examples of that." Rolling Stone writer Bienstock found the lyrics of "Opinion" to be pointed, but felt it "comes off as little more than a sketch of a song." Scott Reid from Cokemachineglow opined, "though a fine song, it's not hard to understand why the group never bothered to record it proper." Likewise, David Browne of Entertainment Weekly contrasted the song with other leftovers and outtakes from Nevermind which he viewed as strong and remarked, "Too bad the band never cut the driving ”Opinion.”

=== Accolades ===
Year	Publication	Country	Accolade	Rank
2019	NME	United Kingdom	Every Nirvana song ranked in order of greatness	38
2019	Rolling Stone	United States	All 102 Nirvana Songs Ranked	80

== Recording and release history ==
Date recorded	Studio/venue	Releases	Personnel
September 25, 1990	KAOS (FM), Olympia, Washington	With the Lights Out (2004); Sliver: The Best Of The Box (2005)	Kurt Cobain (vocals, guitar)
c. 1992-1994	Unknown studio	Unreleased	Kurt Cobain (vocals, guitar); Krist Novoselic (bass); Dave Grohl (drums)
1994	Cobain residence	Unreleased (Note: A short clip of this version appears in the film Kurt Cobain: Montage of Heck in 2015. The full clip of this version was leaked online in April 2024.)	Kurt Cobain (vocals, guitar)
