= Fecal Matter (band) =

American punk rock band (1985–1986)

- Kurt Cobain in 1985, at the time of the band's formation

Background information
- Origin: Aberdeen, Washington, U.S.
- Genres: Punk rock; heavy metal; sludge metal; noise rock
- Years active: 1985–1986
- Spinoffs: Nirvana
- Spinoff of: Melvins
- Past members: Kurt Cobain; Dale Crover; Buzz Osborne; Mike Dillard; Greg Hokanson

Fecal Matter was a punk rock band from Aberdeen, Washington. The group was formed in 1985 by Kurt Cobain, the future frontman of Nirvana, along with Dale Crover of the Melvins and drummer Greg Hokanson. Melvins members Buzz Osborne (also known as "King Buzzo") and Mike Dillard appeared in a later version of the band during rehearsals the following year. The band was short-lived, disbanding in 1986.

Songs from the group's sole recording session were issued as the Illiteracy Will Prevail demo tape. "Spank Thru" was previously released, as well as a re-recording of 'Downer'. The latter was released on the first Nirvana album, Bleach. The rather obscure 1986 punk rock compilation album Get Obnoxious featured the track "Sound of Dentage". Illiteracy Will Prevail is the earliest documentation of Cobain's songwriting in circulation, and helped Cobain establish himself as a composer and performer among his peers in the emerging grunge scene in Washington State.

== History ==
Fecal Matter formed in early 1985 after Cobain dropped out of Aberdeen High School. One of "several joke bands" that arose from the circle of friends associated with the Melvins, it initially included Cobain singing and playing guitar, Melvins drummer Dale Crover playing bass, and Greg Hokanson playing drums. The band spent several months rehearsing original material and covers, including songs by The Ramones, Led Zeppelin, and Jimi Hendrix.

In the SeaTac home of Cobain's aunt, Mari Earl, Cobain and Crover recorded the Illiteracy Will Prevail demo on a 4-track recorder. The date of the recording session has been disputed; many have followed Michael Azerrad's dating of the session to December 1985 in his Come as You Are: The Story of Nirvana biography from 1993, while Gillian Gaar contends in her 2012 biography Entertain Us!: The Rise of Nirvana that Easter break (i.e., late March) in 1986 is more likely. With Crover playing both bass and drums, the two recorded 13 original songs in total, which Cobain would later remember as a "totally abrasive" batch of punk songs reflecting his dual interest in Black Sabbath and Black Flag. Although Crover later dismissed the demo as "amateurish," Melvins frontman Buzz Osborne recalled a "certain magic" in the band's simple but effective recording, citing as memorable their "ability to put something together in an interesting way."

Later in 1986, Osborne and former Melvins drummer Mike Dillard joined the group playing bass and drums, respectively. This incarnation rehearsed for a brief time only; Azerrad mentions Cobain's frustration with Osborne for failing to take the band seriously enough to buy a bass guitar amplifier. The only live performance of this era occurred on May 3, 1986, in Olympia under the name Brown Towel (sometimes reported as "Brown Cow"). This short-lived and related project featured Cobain's poetry and lyrics along with Osborne and Crover's musical accompaniment.

Fecal Matter disbanded that year while Melvins supported their debut EP, Six Songs.

== Legacy ==
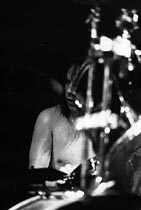
Crover, shown here in 1991, recorded the Fecal Matter demo with Cobain.

Although the band had become inactive, Cobain continued passing around the Fecal Matter demo tape to friends and peers. His acquaintance Krist Novoselic, with whom Cobain had briefly jammed previously and had wanted to collaborate for some time, heard the tape and particularly liked the song "Spank Thru". The two agreed to form a band, which eventually became Nirvana. They began rehearsals later in 1986 for the new project, and reused the Fecal Matter songs "Downer", "Anorexorcist", and "Spank Thru".

Novoselic later mentioned in the liner notes for the From the Muddy Banks of the Wishkah live album that "Spank Thru" was "...the first Nirvana song" and it is perhaps the earliest known example of what would become Nirvana's signature combination of punk energy, noise, and pop melodies. "Spank Thru" has been featured on several official Nirvana releases and was performed live numerous times early in the band's career:

- "Spank Thru" was recorded by Nirvana on three occasions: January 1988 during the band's first studio recording session and a second version was recorded a few months later. This second version was included on the Sub Pop 200 compilation released in December 1988, making it the third ever Nirvana song to be officially released. Later in 1989, "Spank Thru" was also recorded at the band's first BBC Peel Session.
- "Spank Thru" holds the distinction of being the only Fecal Matter song played live after 1988. It was included on many Bleach-era setlists and rarely on Nevermind-era setlists. Officially released live versions include: a 1990 live version that was included the UK "Sliver" CD single pressing and later deluxe versions of Bleach, a 1991 version included on the From the Muddy Banks of the Wishkah live album, and the band's 1992 Live at Reading performance.
- A video recording of a 1988 band rehearsal performance was included on the 2004 With the Lights Out boxed set's DVD.
- The 2005 Nirvana rarities album Sliver: The Best of the Box included the original "Spank Thru" recording; this is the first and only official release of any recording from Illiteracy Will Prevail.

"Downer" was re-recorded by Nirvana in January 1988 during the band's first studio recording session. Although originally omitted, "Downer" was eventually added to Nirvana's Bleach album starting with its 1990 CD reissue, and was part of the Incesticide compilation.

The song "Anorexorcist", part of a nine-minute medley on the Fecal Matter demo, was on setlists of several early Nirvana shows. "Anorexorcist" was played during a 1987 performance on KAOS when the band was named "Skid Row"; this performance was eventually officially released on the With the Lights Out boxed set.

Illiteracy Will Prevail remained a highly sought-after, elusive collector's item as Nirvana rose to fame, and was notorious for bootleg versions being passed off as the "real" demo.An incomplete, low-quality version of the demo was leaked in March 2006, the first known copy to be publicly shared. A week later, three full songs from the demo were briefly hosted on a MySpace site ("Sound of Dentage", "Bambi Slaughter" and "Laminated Effect"). The clips were confirmed authentic by collector Mike Ziegler and others who had heard the demo.

In August 2015, the two anonymous leakers shared the content of the whole tape in both mp3 and lossless format. A remastered version is also available.

== Band members ==
- Kurt Cobain – vocals, guitars (1985–1986)
- Dale Crover – bass guitar, drums (1985–1986)
- Greg Hokanson – drums (1985–1986)
- Buzz Osborne – bass guitar (1986)
- Mike Dillard – drums (1986)

== Illiteracy Will Prevail ==
Illiteracy Will Prevail

Demo album by Fecal Matter
- Recorded: Easter, 1986
- Studio: Mari Earl's home in Burien, Washington
- Genres: Punk rock, sludge metal
- Length: Variable/Unconfirmed
- Label: Self-released
- Producers: Kurt Cobain, Dale Crover

No.	Title	Length
1.	"Sound of Dentage"	3:42
2.	Untitled (Reefer Madness and commercial excerpts)	1:19
3.	"Bambi Slaughter"	3:24
4.	"Laminated Effect (also known as "Made Not Born")"	2:10
5.	"Control (also known as "Are You Controlled")"	2:39
6.	"Punk Rocker"	3:50
7.	"Boatakk"	1:57
8.	"Anorexorcist"	9:16
9.	"Accusations"	4:35
10.	"Spank Thru"	3:51
11.	"Vaseline (also known as “Insurance”)"	1:31
12.	"Class of '86 (also known as "Buffy's Pregnant")"	4:20
13.	"Blather’s Log"	2:29
14.	"Downer"	3:04
15.	"Instra-Mental" (Instrumental version of track 7)	1:40
16.	"Turnaround" (Original Devo version)	2:07
17.	"Riffs" (Guitar riffs to songs on the album)	6:13/1:37
Total length:		Variable/Unconfirmed

Notes

- The titles "Laminated Effect" and "Blather's Log" are thought to apply to two of the compositions on the cassette, though it is unclear which.
- The tape was recorded on a TEAC A-2340 four-track recorder. The inside of the cover listed hand-written contact information for Cobain and Crover.
- "Riffs" length is variable. Most circulating versions are 1:37-1:40 minutes long, but in higher quality than the 6:13 one. This song is a Cobain Solo and from a different practice session rather than the Fecal Matter one.

Personnel

- Kurt Cobain – vocals, guitar
- Dale Crover – bass, drums, backing vocals
