= Spank Thru =

Song by Nirvana

from the album Illiteracy Will Prevail Sub Pop 200 Sliver: The Best of the Box
- Written: mid-1985
- Released: Easter, 1986 (Illiteracy Will Prevail); December 28, 1988(Sub Pop 200); November 1, 2005 (Sliver: The Best of the Box)
- Recorded: September 10, 1985(partly) and Easter, 1986 (Illiteracy Will Prevail, Sliver: The Best of the Box); June 30, 1988 (Sub Pop 200)
- Studio: Kurt Cobain's aunt's home in Burien, Washington (Illiteracy Will Prevail, Sliver: The Best of the Box); Reciprocal Recording in Seattle, Washington (Sub Pop 200)
- Genre: Grunge, punk rock
- Length: 3:23
- Label: Sub Pop; DGC / Geffen
- Songwriter: Kurt Cobain
- Producer: Jack Endino

"Spank Thru" is a song by the American rock band Nirvana, written by vocalist and guitarist Kurt Cobain. It appears on the compilation album Sub Pop 200, released in December 1988, and which reached the Top 40 of Cashbox magazine's alternative chart.

Though rarely performed live beyond the first few years of the band's existence, the song is significant in that it helped lead to the formation of Nirvana by helping convince bassist Krist Novoselic to start a band with Cobain. Novoselic specifically referred to the song as "the first Nirvana song" in the liner notes to the live compilation album From the Muddy Banks of the Wishkah, released in October 1996.

== Origin and recording ==
=== Early history ===
"Spank Thru" dates back to 1986, when it was included on the demo tape Illiteracy Will Prevail released by Cobain's short-lived band, Fecal Matter. Novoselic, who lived in Cobain's hometown of Aberdeen, Washington, later claimed that hearing this version, which featured Melvins drummer Dale Crover on drums and backing vocals, led to him forming what would become Nirvana with Cobain. "One of the songs on [the tape] was 'Spank Thru,'" Novoselic told Kurt St. Thomas in 1992. "He turned me on to it, and I really liked it, it kind of got me excited. So I go, 'Hey man, let's start a band.'" The Fecal Matter version of "Spank Thru" missed inclusion on the band's rarities box set, With the Lights Out, in November 2004, but was one of three previously unreleased recordings that appeared on the box set highlights compilation, Sliver: The Best of the Box, in November 2005.

"Spank Thru" was among the songs performed at Nirvana's first recorded live performance, at a house party in Raymond, Washington around July 1987.

The song was also performed during the band's first radio session, on May 6, 1987, at The Evergreen State College in Olympia, Washington for KAOS (FM). The band, then called "Skid Row", featured Aaron Burckhard on drums, along with Cobain and Novoselic.

It was first recorded in the studio during Nirvana's first studio session, by Jack Endino at Reciprocal Recording on January 23, 1988. As with the Fecal Matter version, this recording features Crover on drums and backing vocals.

=== Sub Pop 200 ===
A second version was recorded by Endino several months later at the same location, this time featuring the band's new drummer Chad Channing on drums and Endino on backing vocals. This version was released on the compilation album Sub Pop 200 in December, 1988. The album, which was released to promote the Seattle-based Sub Pop record label and showcase the emerging "grunge" scene, was released shortly after the band's two-song debut single, "Love Buzz", making "Spank Thru" the third Nirvana song to be officially released. Sub Pop 200 reached number 36 on Cashbox magazine's alternative albums chart in February 1989.

=== Post-Sub Pop 200 ===
On October 26, 1989, the band recorded a version of "Spank Thru" during their first BBC Peel Session, at Maida Vale Studios in London, England.

A live version, recorded at the Pine Street Theatre in Portland, Oregon on February 9, 1990, was released on British CD versions of the "Sliver" single in 1991. This version is notably faster than other versions, and includes lyrical changes.

A live version of "Spank Thru" can be found on the "Blind Pig" bootleg of the band's show at the Blind Pig in Ann Arbor, Michigan on April 10, 1990.

In August of 1992, Nirvana headlined the British Reading Festival and performed "Spank Thru". The full show was released on CD and DVD in 2009 as Live at Reading.

The final live performance of "Spank Thru" was at the Estadio José Amalfitani in Buenos Aires, Argentina on October 30, 1992.

== Composition ==
=== Music ===
Tim Hughes called the song "an interesting composite of two very different parts," with an "opening guitar riff that satirizes "The Great White Buffalo" by Ted Nugent" and lyrics that "mock the sentimental love poetry" of 70s arena rock bands, before it "abruptly shifts gears into a high-energy punk rock about masturbation."

=== Lyrics ===
"Spank Thru" contains numerous references to masturbation. Amanda Petrusich of Pitchfork described it as "a charming ode to jerking off," while Everett True called it "a paean to masturbation."

== Reception ==
In 2015, Rolling Stone listed the song at number 54 on their ranking of 102 Nirvana songs.

== Other releases ==
- A full-band rehearsal demo from December 1988, filmed above a hair salon in Aberdeen owned by Krist's mother, Maria Novoselic, appeared on the DVD of With the Lights Out.
- The full Pine Street show, including "Spank Thru", was included on the 20th Anniversary Deluxe Edition of Bleach in November 2009.
- A live version, recorded at Castello Vi de Porta, Castello 41 in Rome, Italy on November 19, 1991, appeared on the album From the Muddy Banks of the Wishkah, released in 1996.

=== Unreleased versions ===
- The first studio demo, recorded by Endino at Reciprocal on January 23, 1988, has never been officially released.
- The version recorded for the BBC in London on October 26, 1989, also remains unreleased.
