= Old Age (song) =

Composition by Kurt Cobain

- B-side label of Hole's UK single

Single by Hole
- A-side: "Beautiful Son" "Violet"
- Released: April 1993
- Genre: Alternative rock
- Length: 3:36 (1993 recording); 4:24 (1994 recording)
- Label: City Slang, DGC
- Composer: Kurt Cobain
- Lyricists: Kurt Cobain, Courtney Love

"Old Age"

Song by Nirvana
- Released: November 23, 2004
- Genre: Alternative rock
- Length: 4:22 (March 1991 boombox recording); 4:20 (May 1991 studio recording)
- Label: DGC
- Composer: Kurt Cobain
- Lyricist: Kurt Cobain

"Old Age" is a song first released by the American rock band Hole, composed by Kurt Cobain of Nirvana with lyrics later written by Courtney Love. At the time of Hole's recording of the song, Love was married to Cobain.

The song was unknown as a Nirvana song during the band's existence, and its authorship was originally attributed to Love. In a 1997 Melody Maker interview, Love revealed that the song was "partly someone else's composition" without specifying whom, saying, "It's something somebody had a little bit of and I said 'let me have the rest of it' and I wrote this thing in it and tried to make it goth. I found it, wrote it, and recorded it the same night." In 1998, a cassette of Nirvana performing the song during a rehearsal in March 1991 was given to the Seattle newspaper, The Stranger.

== History ==
"Old Age" dates back to at least 1991. In March 1991, Nirvana recorded a demo on a boombox during a rehearsal in Tacoma, Washington for Butch Vig, who had been enlisted to produce their upcoming album, Nevermind, later that year. The tape was intended to familiarize Vig with their current material. The song was attempted during the Nevermind sessions, at Sound City Studios in Van Nuys, California in May 1991, but never completed, featuring only scratch vocals by Cobain, and remained unmixed. Sometime in 1992, Cobain recorded a solo, acoustic version on a boombox at his home in Los Angeles. "Old Age" was never performed by Nirvana in concert, but was considered for their 1993 MTV Unplugged performance.

According to Ronald Lankford Cobain's lyrics were rewritten by Courtney Love. The play on "Old Age/Jesus saves" is not found in all versions of the song but appears at the end of some acoustic versions recorded by Cobain at his home.

The first official release of "Old Age" was in April 1993, when an acoustic version appeared as a B-side on the Hole single, "Beautiful Son." A second, more polished studio version, featuring different lyrics and a different ending, was recorded by Paul Q. Kolderie and Sean Slade at Triclops Sound Studios in Marietta, Georgia in October 1993, during the sessions for what became Hole's second album, Live Through This. The song features pump organ by Slade. The full recording was omitted from the album, released in April 1994, but part of it was attached to the beginning of the song "Credit in the Straight World," which appears on the album. The full song was released as a b-side to the "Violet" single in March 1995, and re-released on the rarities compilation, My Body, the Hand Grenade, in October 1997. On February 14, 1995, Hole played the song as a part of their MTV Unplugged set in New York City.

In 1998, a cassette of Nirvana's March 1991 rehearsal featuring the song was given to the Seattle newspaper The Stranger by an "anonymous source," suggesting that the song had originally started as a Nirvana song. When contacted by The Stranger as to the song's authorship, Nirvana bassist Krist Novoselic confirmed that the song was a Cobain composition.

Nirvana's first official release of the song was in November 2004, when the unfinished studio version appeared on the rarities box set, With the Lights Out. The same version was re-released on the compilation album, Sliver: The Best of the Box, in November 2005. The March 1991 boombox demo was released on the 20th anniversary edition of Nevermind in September 2011.

== Recording and release history ==
Artist	Date recorded	Studio	Producer/recorder	Releases	Personnel
Nirvana	March 1991	Converted barn, Tacoma	Nirvana	Nevermind (deluxe) (2011)	Kurt Cobain - vocals, guitar; Krist Novoselic - bass; Dave Grohl - drums
Nirvana	May 2–28, 1991	Sound City Studios	Butch Vig	With the Lights Out (2004); Sliver: The Best of the Box (2005)	Kurt Cobain - vocals, guitar; Krist Novoselic - bass; Dave Grohl - drums
Nirvana	1992	Cobain Residence, Los Angeles	Kurt Cobain	Montage Of Heck 2 (Bootleg)^{[A]}	Kurt Cobain - vocals, guitar
Hole	November 8–10, 1992	Word of Mouth Productions	Jack Endino	Beautiful Son (1993)	Courtney Love - vocals, rhythm guitar; Eric Erlandson - lead guitar
Hole	October 1993	Triclops Studios, Atlanta	Paul Q. Kolderie; Sean Slade	Violet (1995); My Body, the Hand Grenade (1997)	Courtney Love - vocals, rhythm guitar; Eric Erlandson - lead guitar

== Notes ==
- A Although the version of "Old Age" that was recorded in 1992 at the Cobain Residence remains officially unreleased, this demo was first published on the bootleg "The Chosen Rejects, CD 1" on November 1, 2006.
