= Aaron Burckhard =

American drummer (born 1963)

- Born: November 14, 1963 (age 62); Aberdeen, Washington, U.S.
- Instruments: Drums
- Formerly of: Nirvana, Attica, Screaming Sons of..., Under Sin

Aaron Burckhard (born November 14, 1963) is an American musician who was the second drummer, after Bob McFadden, recruited for Kurt Cobain and Krist Novoselic's rock group that soon came to be known as Nirvana. Burckhard performed as a part of this band until October 1987. Burckhard was no longer a part of Nirvana by the time it recorded its first demo at Reciprocal Recordings in Seattle on January 23, 1988 (Dale Crover of Melvins served as his replacement).

== With Nirvana ==
Burckhard's drumming can be heard on the first disc of Nirvana's With the Lights Out. He played at the band's first live show, which was a 1987 house party in Raymond, Washington. He also played drums for a radio broadcast on KAOS on May 6, 1987.

Burckhard's dismissal purportedly came as a result of his volatile nature which propelled him into frequent physical confrontations with people. An additional complaint against Burckhard was that he did not take his membership with the band as seriously as Kurt Cobain wanted him to. Burckhard frequently skipped practice, which infuriated Cobain. The last straw occurred when Burckhard got Cobain's car impounded after getting arrested for DUI.

== Post-Nirvana ==
Beginning in 2005, Burckhard played with the band Attica. In 2011, Burckhard, Clint Mullins, and Mat Watson formed the band Screaming Sons of... In 2013, he joined a new band called Under Sin.

| Preceded by N/A: Original drummer | Drummer of Nirvana; Early 1987 – December 1987 | Succeeded by Dale Crover |
