= With the Lights Out =

2004 compilation box set by Nirvana

Box set by Nirvana
- Released: November 23, 2004
- Recorded: 1987–1994
- Genres: Grunge; alternative rock; punk rock
Length
CD 1: 71:25; CD 2: 71:31; CD 3: 73:31	Overall: 216:27
DVD: 66:14
- Label: DGC
- Producers: Jack Endino; Greg Babior; Steve Fisk; Butch Vig; Steve Albini; Lance Bangs

Nirvana chronology
Nirvana (2002)	With the Lights Out (2004)	Sliver: The Best of the Box (2005)

With the Lights Out is a box set by the American rock band Nirvana, released on November 23, 2004. It contains three CDs and one DVD of previously rare or unreleased material, including B-sides, demos, and rehearsal and live recordings. The title comes from the lyrics of Nirvana's 1991 single "Smells Like Teen Spirit".

With the Lights Out was planned for release in 2001, but was delayed by a legal battle with Courtney Love, the widow of Nirvana singer, Kurt Cobain. As of 2016, it had sold 546,000 copies in the US.

== Background ==
Rumors of a posthumous Nirvana anthology surfaced in the mid-1990s, not long after the death of the singer and guitarist, Kurt Cobain, in April 1994. It was reported in Kerrang! in April 1999 that the surviving Nirvana members, Dave Grohl and Krist Novoselic, were planning a box set to be released in 2000 at the earliest. It was later announced that a 45-track box set would be released in September 2001, to mark the 10th anniversary of the band's breakthrough album, Nevermind, but it was delayed by a legal battle with Cobain's widow, Courtney Love.

Much of the dispute centered on the unreleased song "You Know You're Right", recorded in January 1994 during the band's final studio session. Grohl and Novoselic wanted it for the box set, but Love blocked its release and sued them for control of Nirvana's legacy. Love's lawsuit asserted that "the parties have fundamentally different concepts of how to manage the musical and artistic legacy of Kurt Cobain", which resulted "in a stalemate of decision making". She believed that "You Know You're Right" would be "wasted" on a box set, and instead belonged on a single-disc compilation similar to the Beatles' 1.

In 2002, the legal battle was settled, and "You Know You're Right" appeared on the "best-of" compilation Nirvana. This paved the way for what became the With the Lights Out box set, which arrived in November 2004, over three years after its original release date but with more music than originally promised, including an acoustic demo of "You Know You're Right".

== Release ==
=== Promotion ===
Before the release of With the Lights Out, a promotional EP, Selections from With the Lights Out, was sent to radio stations, featuring the songs "White Lace and Strange", "Blandest", "Lithium", "Heart-Shaped Box" and "You Know You're Right" from the box set. "Lithium" was also released as an exclusive iTunes downloadable single on November 22, 2004. The music video for the original version of "In Bloom", made in 1990 and first released on the Sub Pop Video Network Program VHS compilation in 1991, was released to music television to promote the box set. The video appears on the box set's DVD. An online trailer was also released for the box set, featuring footage from the DVD and audio from the three CDs.

=== Packaging ===
With the Lights Out is packaged in heat-sensitive material which changes color when touched, revealing images of recording session tapes.

Each of the three CDs loosely represents the rare recordings from three periods in Nirvana's history, in line with the band's three studio albums, Bleach, Nevermind and In Utero, which were released in 1989, 1991 and 1993 respectively. The DVD contains rare live performances and rehearsals from throughout the band's career.

It includes a 60-page booklet which contains liner notes by Thurston Moore of the American rock band Sonic Youth and the journalist Neil Strauss, as well as photographs and a chronological catalog of the band's recording history, including studio sessions, television and radio appearances, live performances and home demo recordings sessions.

The band's May 6, 1987 radio session at KAOS 89.3 FM in Olympia, Washington, is mislabeled as being from April 17, 1987.

== Reception ==
Professional ratings
Aggregate scores
Source	Rating
Metacritic	76/100
Review scores
Source	Rating
AllMusic	4/5 stars
The Encyclopedia of Popular Music	3/5 stars
Entertainment Weekly	A−
The Guardian	4/5 stars
NME	7/10
Pitchfork Media	6.3/10
PopMatters	5/10
Q	4/5 stars
Rolling Stone	4.5/5 stars
Spin	A

With the Lights Out received generally positive reviews from music critics, many of whom saw it as a valuable glimpse into the band's evolution. Julian Marshall of the NME called it "a humanising, comprehensive and often heartbreaking document of a man who, in five years, changed the face of music, almost by accident". John Jeremiah Sullivan of New York Magazine called it "an appropriately eccentric testament to Cobain's talent".

However, several critics felt it contained too much second-rate material never intended for release. Mark Richardson of Pitchfork wrote, "Those hoping for a trove of overlooked gems will be disappointed ... Simply put, there's enough good stuff here for a solid single disc." Tim O'Neil of PopMatters wrote, "The majority of the material presented here will appeal only to a select group of hardcore fans, music historians and critics."

== Track listing ==
All songs written by Kurt Cobain, except where noted.

=== Disc one ===
- 1987 show in Raymond, Washington.
1. "Heartbreaker" (John Bonham/John Paul Jones/Jimmy Page/Robert Plant) – 2:59
- May 6, 1987 radio session at KAOS 89.3 FM, Olympia, Washington. (Nirvana's first radio session)
2. "Anorexorcist" (a.k.a. "Annorexorcist") – 2:44
3. "White Lace and Strange" (Chris Bond) – 2:09
4. "Help Me, I'm Hungry" (a.k.a. "Vendetagainst") – 2:41
- Summer 1987 band rehearsal in Aberdeen, Washington.
5. "Mrs. Butterworth" (a.k.a. "Unknown #2") – 4:05
- January 23, 1988 studio session at Reciprocal Recording Studios, Seattle, Washington. Producer: Jack Endino. (Nirvana's first studio session)
6. "If You Must" – 4:01
7. "Pen Cap Chew" – 4:02
- January 23, 1988 show at the Community World Theatre, Tacoma, Washington.
8. "Downer" – 1:43
9. "Floyd the Barber" – 2:33
10. "Raunchola" (a.k.a. "Erectum")/"Moby Dick" ("Moby Dick" – John Bonham/John Paul Jones/Jimmy Page) – 6:24
- 1987–1988 solo 4-track home recordings, Aberdeen, Washington.
11. "Beans" – 1:32
12. "Don't Want It All" (a.k.a. "Seed") – 2:26
13. "Clean Up Before She Comes" – 3:12
14. "Polly" – 2:30
15. "About a Girl" – 2:44
- June 11, 1988 studio session at Reciprocal Recording Studios, Seattle, Washington. Producer: Jack Endino
16. "Blandest" – 3:56
- Spring 1989 studio session at The Evergreen State College Audio Studio, Olympia, Washington. Producer: Greg Babior.
17. "Dive" (Kurt Cobain/Krist Novoselic) – 4:50
- August 20 and 28, 1989 studio session at Reciprocal Recording Studios, Seattle, Washington. Producer: Jack Endino. (Studio session for "the Jury", a Lead Belly cover band featuring members of Nirvana and the Screaming Trees)
18. "They Hung Him on a Cross" (Huddie Ledbetter) – 1:57
19. "Grey Goose" (Huddie Ledbetter) – 4:36
20. "Ain't It a Shame" (Huddie Ledbetter) – 2:01
- September 1989 studio session at Music Source Studios, Seattle, Washington. Producer: Steve Fisk.
21. "Token Eastern Song" – 3:21
22. "Even in His Youth" – 3:12
23. "Polly" – 2:36

=== Disc two ===
- September 25, 1990 solo radio session on Boy Meets Girl, KAOS 89.3 FM, Olympia, Washington. Host: Calvin Johnson.
1. "Opinion" – 1:34
2. "Lithium" – 1:49
3. "Been a Son" – 1:12
- 1990 boombox-recorded home demos, Olympia, Washington.
4. "Sliver" – 2:09
5. "Where Did You Sleep Last Night" (traditional) – 2:31
- April 2–6, 1990 studio session at Smart Studios, Madison, Wisconsin. Producer: Butch Vig.
6. "Pay to Play" (early version of "Stay Away") (previously released on DGC Rarities: Volume 1 in 1994) – 3:29
7. "Here She Comes Now" (John Cale/Sterling Morrison/Lou Reed) (previously released on split-single with the Melvins in 1991) – 5:01
- April 1991 4-track demo, San Francisco, California. Features Dale Crover on drums and Dave Grohl on bass.
8. "Drain You" – 2:38
- January 1, 1991 studio session at Music Source Studios, Seattle, Washington. Producer: Craig Montgomery
9. "Aneurysm" (Kurt Cobain/Dave Grohl/Krist Novoselic) (previously released on "Smells Like Teen Spirit" single in 1991) – 4:47
- March 1991 band rehearsal, Tacoma, Washington.
10. "Smells Like Teen Spirit" (Kurt Cobain/Dave Grohl/Krist Novoselic) – 5:40
- May 1991 studio session at Sound City Studios, Van Nuys, California. Producer: Butch Vig. (Studio session for Nevermind)
11. "Breed" (Butch Vig rough mix) – 3:07
12. "Verse Chorus Verse" – 3:17
13. "Old Age" – 4:20
- September 3, 1991 radio session at Maida Vale Studios, London, England. (John Peel session)
14. "Endless, Nameless" – 8:47
15. "Dumb" – 2:35
- October 21, 1990 radio session at Maida Vale Studios, London, England. (John Peel session)
16. "D-7" (Greg Sage) (previously released on "Lithium" single in 1992) – 3:46
- April 7, 1992 studio session at Laundry Room Studios, Seattle, Washington. Producer: Barrett Jones.
17. "Oh, the Guilt" (alternate mix of previously released song on split-single with the Jesus Lizard in 1992) – 3:25
18. "Curmudgeon" (alternate mix of previously released song on "Lithium" single in 1992) – 3:03
19. "Return of the Rat" (Greg Sage) (alternate mix of previously released song on Eight Songs for Greg Sage and the Wipers in 1993) – 3:09
- May 1991 studio session at Sound City Studios, Van Nuys, California. Producer: Butch Vig. (Studio session for Nevermind)
20. "Smells Like Teen Spirit" (Kurt Cobain/Dave Grohl/Krist Novoselic) (Butch Vig mix) – 4:59

=== Disc three ===
- May 1991 solo boombox-recorded home demo, Los Angeles, California.
1. "Rape Me" – 3:23
- October 25–26, 1992 studio session at Word of Mouth Studios (former Reciprocal Recording Studios), Seattle, Washington. Producer: Jack Endino.
2. "Rape Me" – 3:01
- Winter 1992 band rehearsal, Seattle, Washington.
3. "Scentless Apprentice" (Kurt Cobain/Dave Grohl/Krist Novoselic) – 9:32
- January 19–21, 1993 studio session at Ariola Ltda BMG, Rio de Janeiro, Brazil. Producer: Craig Montgomery.
4. "Heart-Shaped Box" – 5:31
5. "I Hate Myself and Want to Die" – 4:03 (mislabelled as the "b-side" version)
6. "Milk It" – 4:34
7. "Moist Vagina" (a.k.a. "MV") – 1:56
8. "Gallons of Rubbing Alcohol Flow Through the Strip" (Kurt Cobain/Dave Grohl/Krist Novoselic) (previously released on non-U.S. versions of In Utero, 1993) – 7:33
9. "The Other Improv" – 6:24
- Fall or Winter 1992 solo boombox-recorded home demos, Seattle, Washington.
10. "Serve the Servants" – 1:36
11. "Very Ape" – 1:52
- 1993 solo boombox-recorded home demo, Seattle, Washington.
12. "Pennyroyal Tea" – 3:30
- February 12–26, 1993 studio session at Pachyderm Studios, Cannon Falls, Minnesota. Producer: Steve Albini. (Studio session for In Utero)
13. "Marigold" (Dave Grohl) (previously released on "Heart-Shaped Box" single in 1993) – 2:34
14. "Sappy" (previously released as "Verse Chorus Verse" on No Alternative in 1993) – 3:26
- February 5, 1994 band rehearsal at Pavilhão Dramático, Cascais, Portugal.
15. "Jesus Doesn't Want Me for a Sunbeam" (Eugene Kelly/Frances McKee) – 3:57
- 1994 solo boombox-recorded home demo, Seattle, Washington.
16. "Do Re Mi" – 4:24
- 1993 or 1994 solo boombox-recorded home demo, Seattle, Washington.
17. "You Know You're Right" – 2:30
- 1991 or 1992 solo boombox-recorded home demo, Olympia, Washington, or Seattle, Washington.
18. "All Apologies" – 3:33
- For a limited time, the US iTunes store included Nevermind It's an Interview as bonus tracks.

=== DVD ===
- 1988 band rehearsal, residence of bassist Krist Novoselic's mother, Aberdeen, Washington.
1. "Love Buzz" (Robbie van Leeuwen) – 2:32
2. "Scoff" – 0:47
3. "About a Girl" – 3:05
4. "Big Long Now" – 4:22
5. "Immigrant Song" (Jimmy Page/Robert Plant) – 1:57
6. "Spank Thru" – 3:10
7. "Hairspray Queen" – 3:37
8. "School" – 2:53
9. "Mr. Moustache" – 3:47
- June 23, 1989 show at Rhino Records, Los Angeles, California.
10. "Big Cheese" (Kurt Cobain/Krist Novoselic) – 3:13
- February 16, 1990 show at Bogarts, Long Beach, California.
11. "Sappy" – 4:27 (mislabeled as track 12 on the cover)
- 1990 Sub Pop music video. Director: Steve Brown.
12. "In Bloom" – 4:28 (mislabeled as track 11 on the cover) (Pre-Nevermind version, featuring Chad Channing on drums, recorded April 1990 at Smart Studios, Madison, Wisconsin. Producer: Butch Vig)
- September 22, 1990 show at the Motor Sports International Garage, Seattle, Washington.
13. "School" – 2:33
- October 11, 1990 show at North Shore Surf Club, Olympia, Washington. (Drummer Dave Grohl's first show)
14. "Love Buzz" – 3:40
- April 17, 1991 show at OK Hotel, Seattle, Washington.
15. "Pennyroyal Tea" (first live performance) – 1:55
16. "Smells Like Teen Spirit" (Kurt Cobain/Dave Grohl/Krist Novoselic) (first live performance) – 6:16
17. "Territorial Pissings" – 2:45
- October 31, 1991 show at the Paramount Theatre, Seattle, Washington.
18. "Jesus Doesn't Want Me for a Sunbeam" (Eugene Kelly/Frances McKee) – 3:32
- October 4, 1992 show at the Crocodile Cafe, Seattle Washington.
19. "Talk to Me" – 3:35
- January 22, 1993 studio session at BMG Ariola Studios, Rio de Janeiro, Brazil. Producer: Craig Montgomery.
20. "Seasons in the Sun" (Jacques Brel/Rod McKuen) – 3:40

== Personnel ==
Nirvana

- Kurt Cobain – lead vocals, electric and acoustic guitars, bass and percussion on "Don't Want It All", drums on "Seasons in the Sun"
- Krist Novoselic – bass, lead vocals on "Heartbreaker" (Live), accordion on "Jesus Doesn't Want Me for a Sunbeam" (rehearsal), guitar on "Seasons in the Sun"
- Dave Grohl – drums, backing vocals, lead vocals and guitar on "Marigold", bass on "Drain You" and "Seasons in the Sun"
- Aaron Burckhard – drums on tracks 1–5 (disc one)
- Dale Crover – drums on tracks 6–10 (disc one) and track 8 (disc two)
- Chad Channing – drums on tracks 16, 17, 21–23 (disc one), tracks 6, 7 (disc two) and tracks 1–12 (DVD)
- Dan Peters – drums on track 13 (DVD)
- Jason Everman – 2nd guitar on track 17 (disc one) and track 10 (DVD)
- Pat Smear – 2nd guitar on track 15 (disc three)

Additional personnel

- Tony Poukkula – guitar on track 1 (disc one)
- Mark Lanegan – guitar on tracks 19, 20 (disc one)
- Mark Pickerel – drums on tracks 19, 20 (disc one)
- Melora Creager – cello on track 15 (disc three)

== Sliver: The Best of the Box ==
Sliver: The Best of the Box

Compilation album by Nirvana
- Released: November 1, 2005
- Recorded: 1985–1994
- Genres: Grunge; alternative rock
- Length: 74:24
- Language: English
- Label: DGC

Nirvana chronology
With the Lights Out (2004)	Sliver: The Best of the Box (2005)	Live at Reading (2009)

Professional ratings
Review scores
Source	Rating
AllMusic	3/5 stars
Blender	2/5 stars
Drowned in Sound	4/10
The Encyclopedia of Popular Music	3/5 stars
Pitchfork	6.8/10

=== Recording and release ===
Sliver: The Best of the Box is a compilation album by the American rock band, Nirvana, released in November 2005. It contains 19 tracks from the band's 2004 rarities box set, With the Lights Out, as well as three previously unreleased recordings: "Spank Thru", from the 1985 "Fecal Matter" demo, a 1990 studio recording of "Sappy", and a 1991 boombox demo of "Come as You Are". Sliver: The Best of the Box opened at number 21 on the Billboard 200. Nielson Soundscan reported that as of 2016, Sliver: The Best of the Box has sold 376,000 copies in the U.S.

=== Artwork ===
According to Rolling Stone, the title and cover photograph for Sliver: The Best of the Box were chosen by Frances Bean, the daughter of Cobain and Courtney Love. The cover photograph depicts a cardboard box filled with Nirvana and Cobain tapes, including a copy of the Fecal Matter demo. Some of the tapes have spilled out of the box and are strewn across the floor.

=== Track listing ===
1. "Spank Thru" (March 1986 Fecal Matter demo) – 3:45
2. "Heartbreaker" (July 1987 show in Raymond, Washington) – 2:59
3. "Mrs. Butterworth" (Summer 1987 band demo) – 4:05
4. "Floyd the Barber" (January 23, 1988 show in Tacoma, WA) – 2:33
5. "Clean Up Before She Comes" (1988 home demo) – 3:12
6. "About a Girl" (1988 home demo) – 2:44
7. "Blandest" (June 11, 1988 studio session in Seattle, Washington. Produced by Jack Endino) – 3:56
8. "Ain't It a Shame" (August 1989 studio session in Seattle, WA) – 2:02
9. "Sappy" (January 1990 studio session in Seattle, Washington. Produced by Jack Endino) – 3:33
10. "Opinion" (September 25, 1990 KAOS radio show) – 1:35
11. "Lithium" (September 25, 1990 KAOS radio show) – 1:49
12. "Sliver" (1990 home demo) – 2:10
13. "Smells Like Teen Spirit" (March 1991 boombox demo) – 5:40
14. "Come as You Are" (March 1991 boombox demo) – 4:10
15. "Old Age" (May 1991 studio session for Nevermind) – 4:21
16. "Oh, the Guilt" (April 1992 studio session in Seattle, WA) – 3:25
17. "Rape Me" (May 1991 solo acoustic home demo) – 3:23
18. "Rape Me" (October 1992 studio session in Seattle, WA) – 3:03
19. "Heart-Shaped Box" (January 1993 studio session in Rio de Janeiro, Brazil) – 5:32
20. "Do Re Mi" (1994 boombox demo solo acoustic) – 4:24
21. "You Know You're Right" (1994 boombox demo solo acoustic) – 2:30
22. "All Apologies" (undated boombox demo solo acoustic, circa 1992) – 3:33

== Charts ==
=== With the Lights Out ===
Chart (2004)	Peak position
Austrian Albums (Ö3 Austria)	34
Canadian Albums (Billboard)	10
Belgian Albums (Ultratop Flanders)	21
Belgian Albums (Ultratop Wallonia)	25
Dutch Albums (Album Top 100)	65
French Albums (SNEP)	20
German Albums (Offizielle Top 100)	48
Irish Albums (IRMA)	23
Italian Albums (FIMI)	21
Japanese Albums (Oricon)	16
New Zealand Albums (RMNZ)	39
Norwegian Albums (VG-lista)	31
Scottish Albums (OCC)	26
Swiss Albums (Schweizer Hitparade)	28
UK Albums (Official Charts)	56
UK Rock & Metal Albums (Official Charts)	2
US Billboard 200	19
US Top Music Video Sales (Billboard)	3

=== Year-end charts ===
Chart (2005)	Position
US Billboard 200	180

=== Sliver: The Best of the Box ===
Chart (2005)	Peak position
Australian Albums (ARIA)	95
Austrian Albums (Ö3 Austria)	26
German Albums (Offizielle Top 100)	97
Italian Albums (FIMI)	40
Japanese Albums (Oricon)	33
Scottish Albums (Official Charts)	49
Swiss Albums (Schweizer Hitparade)	87
UK Albums (Official Charts)	56
UK Rock & Metal Albums (Official Charts)	6
US Billboard 200	21

== Certifications ==
Certifications for With the Lights Out
Region	Certification	Certified units/sales
United Kingdom (BPI)	Silver	60,000^{‡}
United States (RIAA)	Platinum	1,000,000^{^}
^{^} Shipments figures based on certification alone.^{‡} Sales+streaming figures based on certification alone.

Certifications for Sliver: The Best of the Box
Region	Certification	Certified units/sales
Australia (ARIA)	Gold	35,000^{‡}
France (SNEP)	Gold	50,000^{‡}
United Kingdom (BPI)	Silver	60,000^{‡}
^{‡} Sales+streaming figures based on certification alone.
