= Vooruit =

Concert hall in Ghent, Belgium

Coordinates: 51°02′52″N 3°43′40″E

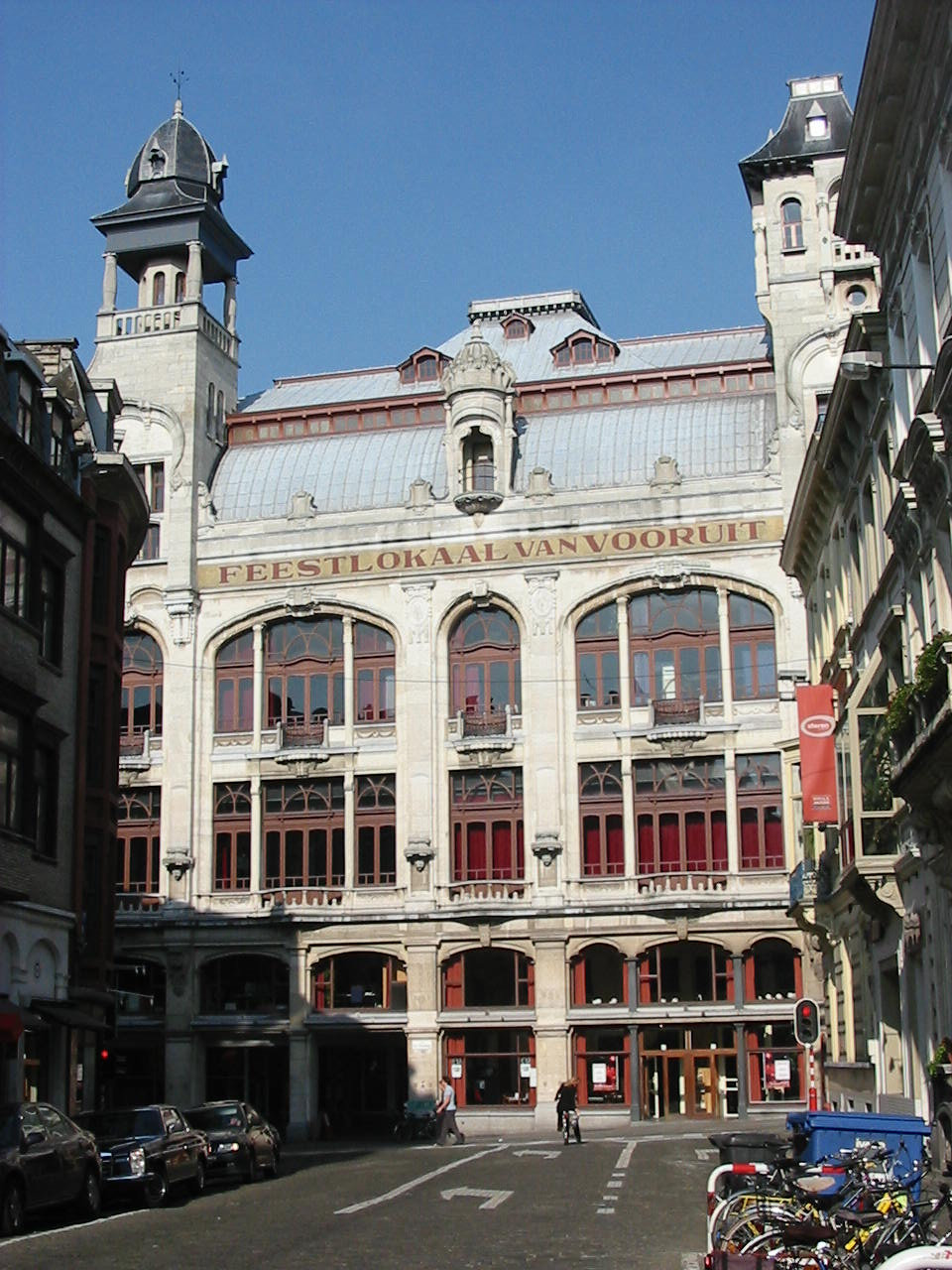
Vooruit arts centre in Ghent

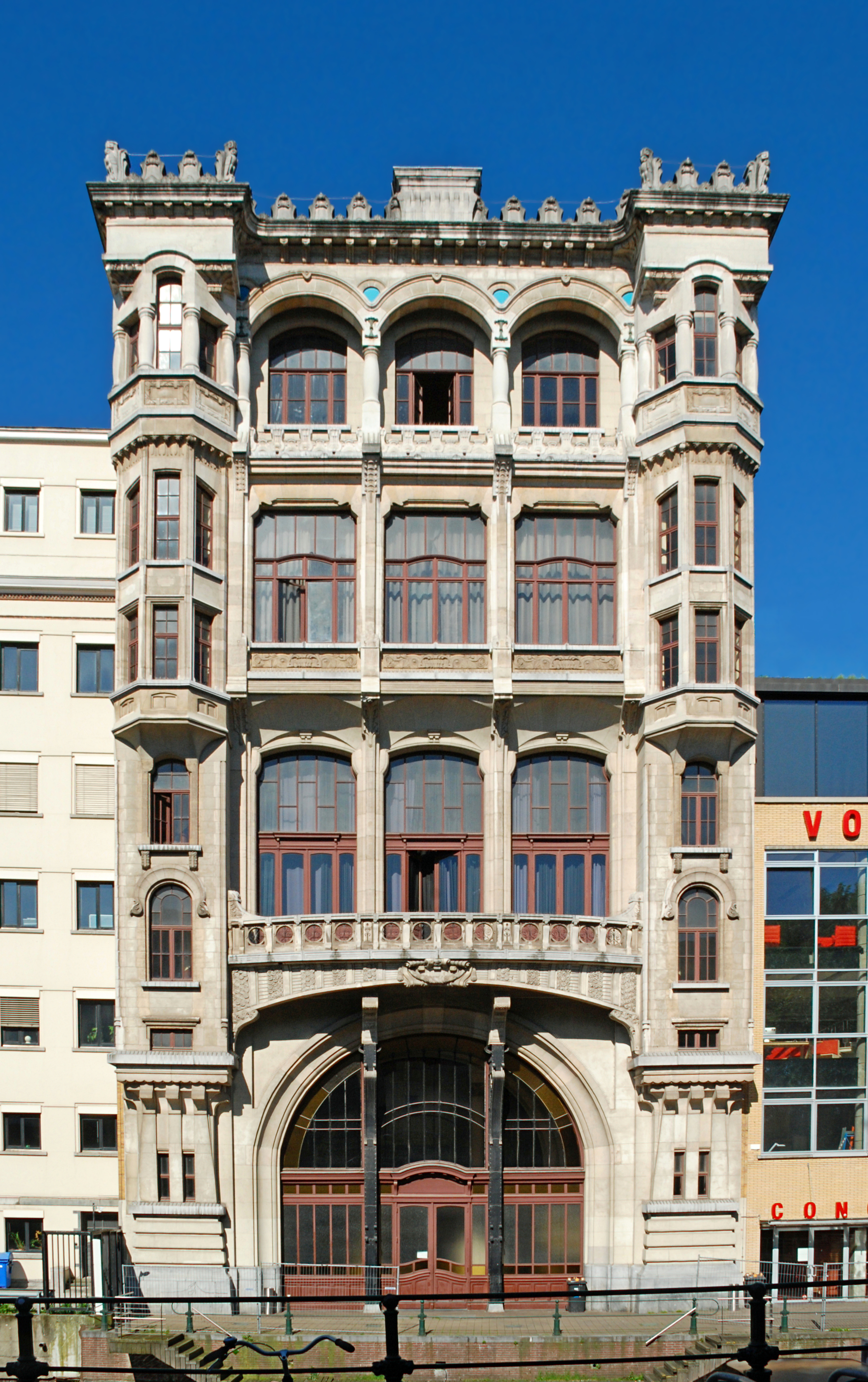
The rear side of the building

Vooruit (Dutch: Kunstencentrum Vooruit [ˈkʏnstə(n)ˌsɛntrʏɱ voːrˈœyt], lit. 'Forward Arts Centre') is a historic complex in Ghent, Belgium. Vooruit was originally the festival and art centre of the Ghent-based labour movement, with a ballroom, cinema, theatre, etc. It is now mainly used for concerts and other cultural events.

== History ==
Vooruit was designed by Ferdinand Dierkens and built between 1911 and 1914, becoming a symbol of the socialist movement in the interwar period. The building is named after the socialist consumer organisation (or cooperative) Vooruit ("Forward") (1891–1970), supported by Edward Anseele, to protect workers against the instability of capitalism. There workers could eat, drink and enjoy culture at affordable costs.

As a festival and arts centre, Vooruit was part of the compartmentalised Flemish society until World War II. After the war, the building deteriorated until the re-launch in 1982 in its present form as a cultural centre. In 1983, Vooruit was recognised as a listed monument. The building continued operating during the restoration process, from 1990 to 2000. In 2000, a fully restored Vooruit was awarded the Flemish Monument of the year prize.

Presently the rooms are used for parties and concerts, but also for cultural events or debates.

== See also ==
- The Maison du Peuple/Volkshuis, a similar building in Brussels built by Victor Horta for the Belgian Workers' Party and demolished in 1965
- Culture of Belgium
- Belgium in the long nineteenth century
