= Mezzago =

- Comune
- Comune di Mezzago
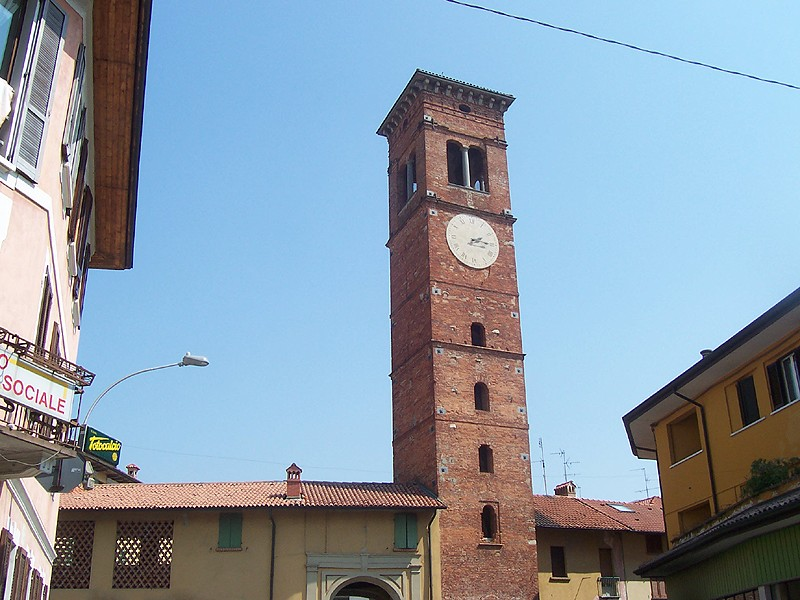

- Coat of arms

- Location within Italy Location within Lombardy
- Coordinates: 45°38′N 9°27′E
- Country: Italy
- Region: Lombardy
- Province: Monza and Brianza (MB)
- Frazioni: Cascina Orobona

Government
  - Mayor: Antonio Colombo

Area
  - Total: 4.2 km^{2} (1.6 sq mi)

Population (Dec. 2004)
  - Total: 3,588
  - Density: 850/km^{2} (2,200/sq mi)
- Demonym: Mezzaghesi
- Time zone: UTC+1 (CET)
  - Summer (DST): UTC+2 (CEST)
- Postal code: 20883
- Dialing code: 039
- Website: Official website

Mezzago is a comune (municipality) in the Province of Monza e Brianza in the Italian region Lombardy, located about 30 kilometres (19 mi) northeast of Milan.

== Main Sights ==
- Bloom: cultural center founded in 1987, managed by Cooperativa Sociale Il Visconte di Mezzago. Known for its support of alternative music, it has hosted famous acts like Nirvana and Green Day. Besides music, Bloom offers a diverse range of cultural events, including independent cinema, theater performances, art exhibitions, and social and environmental festivals.

== Twin towns ==
- Saint-Pierre-de-Chandieu, France, since 1990
- Reilingen, Germany, since 2009

== People ==
- Angelo Colombo, former AC Milan football player
