= You Know You're Right =

2002 single by Nirvana

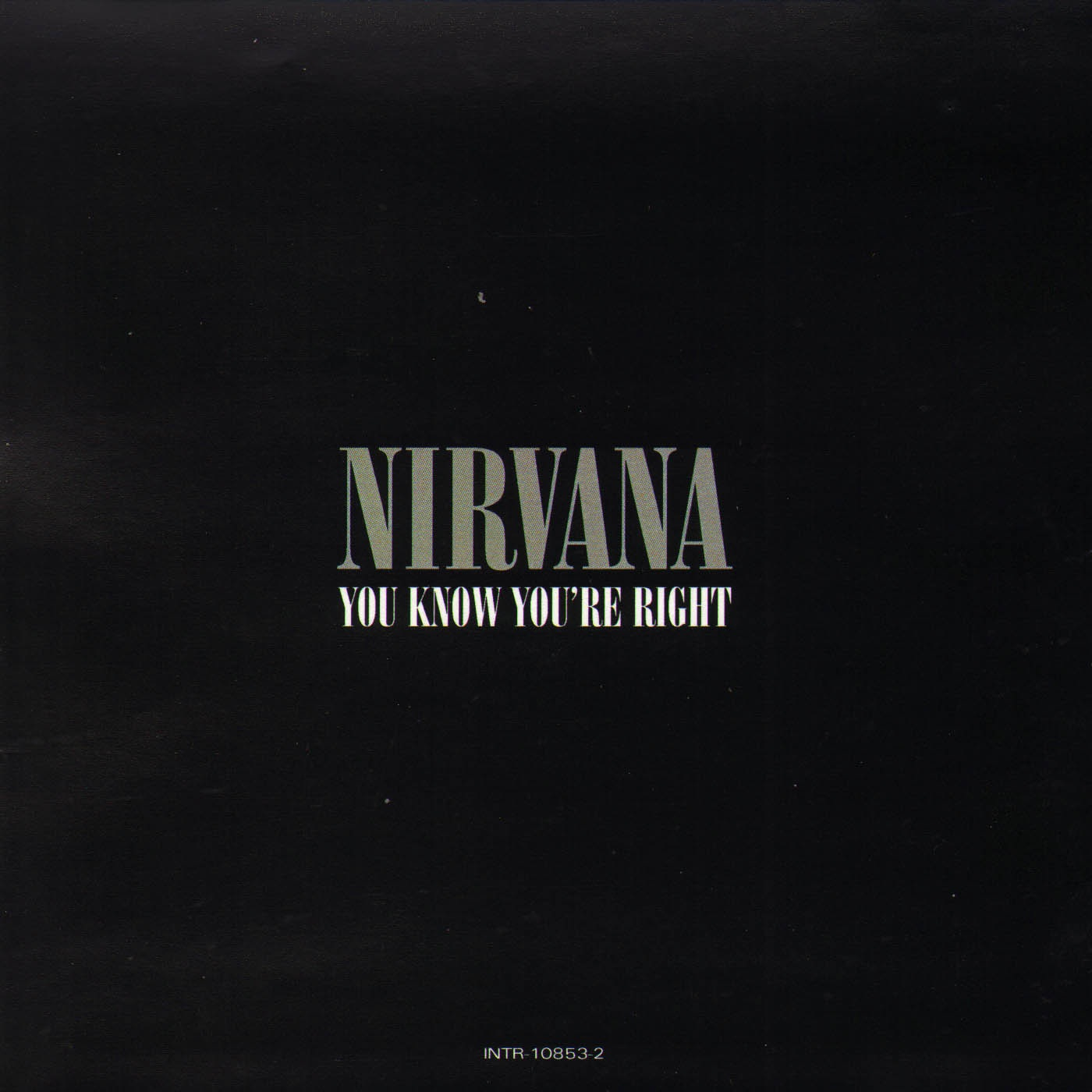

Single by Nirvana

from the album Nirvana
- Released: October 8, 2002
- Recorded: January 30, 1994
- Studio: Robert Lang, Seattle, Washington
- Genre: Grunge; alternative rock
- Length: 3:38
- Label: DGC
- Songwriter: Kurt Cobain
- Producer: Adam Kasper

Nirvana singles chronology
"Drain You" (1996)	"You Know You're Right" (2002)	"Endless, Nameless" (2021)

Music video
- "You Know You're Right" on YouTube

"You Know You're Right" is a song by the American rock band Nirvana, written by lead vocalist and guitarist, Kurt Cobain. It is the first song on the greatest hits album Nirvana, released by DGC Records in October 2002. It is also the final song the band recorded before Cobain's death in April 1994.

For years after Cobain's death, the song was known only from a bootlegged live version, recorded in October 1993 at the Aragon Ballroom in Chicago, Illinois, and from a cover by American rock band Hole, fronted by Cobain's widow, Courtney Love. Surviving Nirvana members Dave Grohl and Krist Novoselic had intended to release the studio version on a posthumous Nirvana box set, but Love blocked its release in 2001, asserting that a recording of such "extraordinary artistic and commercial value" belonged on a cheaper, single disc compilation instead.

In September 2002, "You Know You're Right" was subject to a high profile Internet leak, which led to it being put into heavy rotation on radio stations around the world, despite cease and desist orders from DGC's parent company Geffen Records. Shortly after, it was announced that the lawsuit between Love and Grohl–Novoselic was settled, and that the song would appear on a greatest hits album later that year.

"You Know You're Right" was released as a promo single in October 2002, and reached number one on both Billboard's Mainstream Rock Tracks and Modern Rock Tracks charts. It also reached #45 on the Billboard Hot 100.

== Early history ==
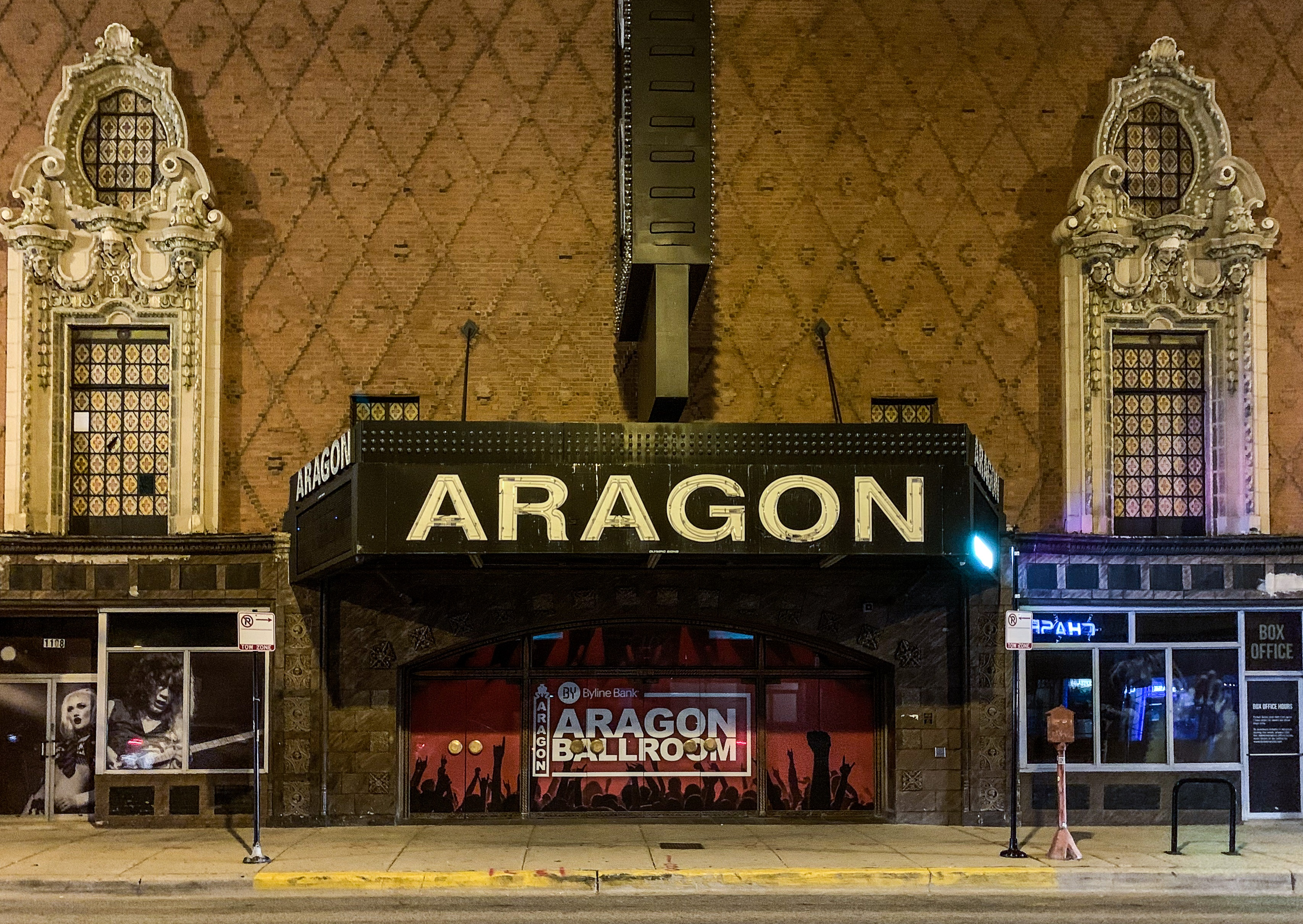
The Aragon Ballroom in Chicago, where Nirvana performed the only known live version of "You Know You're Right", in October 1993.

"You Know You're Right" was written in 1993. A boombox-recorded home demo, featuring Cobain on vocals and guitar, was released posthumously on the Nirvana box set, With the Lights Out, in November 2004. The same version was re-released on the compilation album, Sliver: The Best of the Box, in November 2005.

The full song was only performed once in concert, at the Aragon Ballroom on October 23, 1993. Contemporary reviews of the show did not mention the then-unknown song, but Chicago music journalist Jim DeRogatis later described hearing it at the concert in a 2002 Spin article, recalling that "it was classic Nirvana, hitting with the same impact as 'Smells Like Teen Spirit' and boasting a similar structure – a slow, creepy verse, suddenly exploding into a painfully cathartic but undeniably catchy chorus."

== Robert Lang session ==
"You Know You're Right" was recorded in the studio by Adam Kasper at Nirvana's final session, on January 30, 1994 at Robert Lang Studios in Seattle, Washington. The band had booked the studio for three days during a tour break, but Cobain had been absent for the first two days, leaving Novoselic and Grohl to work on their own songs. Upon Cobain's arrival on the third day, he immediately went to the studio's mixing console and listened to the material his bandmates had recorded, offering support. Despite his apparent enthusiasm for the session, he had arrived at the studio without his gear, and ended up using a Univox guitar that the band's guitar technician, Earnie Bailey, had reworked for him, along with the studio's 50 Watt Marshall amp, which he disliked, and a pedal board with a Boss distortion pedal.

The band jammed for approximately 20 minutes, and then began working on the arrangement of "You Know You're Right", then known as "Kurt's Tune #1". According to a May 2004 Mojo article by Gillian G. Gaar, the band rehearsed the song three times, with the structure "pretty well hashed out" on the first take, and the chiming intro featured in the final version, achieved by Cobain playing the guitar above the nut, first appearing on the third take. Robert Lang, the studio's owner, recalled being "speechless" hearing the song while in the control room with Kasper.

After recording the master instrumental take, the band and others present at the recording session took a break away from the studio to visit a local pizzeria and for Cobain to buy cigarettes, and then returned and recorded another instrumental song, titled "Jam After Dinner". Cobain then recorded the vocals to "You Know You're Right", completing the main vocals in one take, and then adding two additional vocal overdubs. These were the only vocals that Cobain recorded during the session. His final contribution to the recording was a guitar overdub. Novoselic and Grohl recorded six more songs without Cobain, who had likely left by then, after signing the studio door and adding a drawing of a cat next to his signature.

Nirvana's touring guitarist, Pat Smear, lived in Los Angeles and was not present during the session. In a 2002 interview with the website Nirvana Fan Club, he said Cobain had sent him a cassette of the recording and told him he could add his part later. The band dissolved before Smear had the chance. The band reportedly planned to continue work at Lang's studio after their upcoming European tour, but Cobain died just over two months later, after cancelling the tour and returning to Seattle.

The masters of the sessions remained in Novoselic's basement until 1998, when work began on a posthumous Nirvana box set with an intended release date of September 2001, the 10th anniversary of the band's major label debut, Nevermind. The song, now retitled "You Know You're Right", was mixed on July 14 and 15 of that year at Conway Studios in Hollywood, California, in anticipation of its release. According to Novoselic, the final mix does not sound significantly different from the way it sounded when it was recorded in 1994, with the most dramatic changes being the addition of compression and reverb.

== Post-Robert Lang session ==
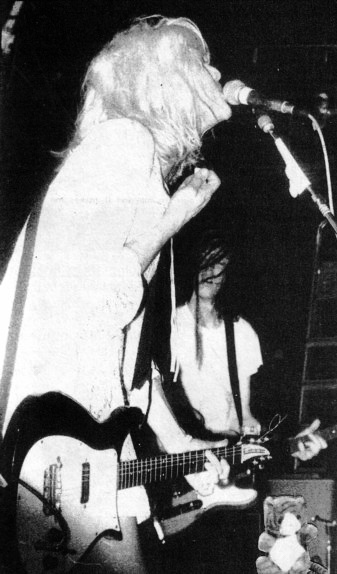
American rock band Hole, fronted by Kurt Cobain's widow, Courtney Love, covered the song as "You've Got No Right" during their MTV Unplugged appearance in February 1995.

Unlike many unreleased Nirvana recordings, the studio version of "You Know You're Right" had never been bootlegged and remained unheard by the public until 2002, when clips provided by Love were played on an episode of the NBC show Access Hollywood. However, an audience recording of the Aragon Ballroom version began appearing on commercial bootlegs as early as 1994, under erroneous titles such as "On a Mountain" and "Autopilot".

The song received further exposure when Hole performed it, under the title "You've Got No Right", during their MTV Unplugged appearance on February 14, 1995. Love introduced it as "a song that Kurt wrote; [the] last song, almost."

In 1995, Love offered the song to American rock musician Mark Lanegan, a friend of Cobain's, to cover with his band, Screaming Trees. As Screaming Trees guitarist Gary Lee Conner recalled in the 2023 book Lanegan, "When we were working on songwriting for Dust...Mark is like, 'Courtney wants us to do a song… And it was that song — 'You Know You're Right'. So, I got a tape of it and we learned it. We never recorded it. But we learned it without Mark, and Mark came down to sing it… and he couldn't. He changed his mind. And that was the end of it." Conner acknowledged that the band "could have had a big hit" by releasing a cover of a then-unknown Nirvana song, but believes Lanegan may have been wary of capitalizing on Cobain's death.

== Lawsuit and release ==
In 2001, the studio version of "You Know You're Right" became the center of a legal dispute between Love and surviving Nirvana members Grohl and Novoselic. Love blocked its release, saying that it would be "wasted" on the planned box set, and was better suited to a single-disc collection similar to the Beatles' compilation album 1. Her lawsuit called the song a "potential 'hit' of extraordinary artistic and commercial value", and her manager asserted that a release with the song could sell 15 million copies. Novoselic said he did not necessarily disagree with Love: "I've always considered everything she said. We've considered it and agreed and said, 'Hey, that's a great idea, Courtney.' I tried to get along with Courtney as best I could, but there's only so much you can do."

In August 2001, one of the earliest firsthand descriptions of the studio version appeared in the Cobain biography Heavier Than Heaven, written by the Seattle music journalist Charles R. Cross, who had been granted access to the recording by Love. Cross called the song "one of the high-water marks in [Cobain's] entire canon," and wrote that "the plaintive wail in the chorus couldn't be clearer: 'Pain', he cried, stretching the word out for almost ten seconds, giving it four syllables, and leaving an impression of inescapable torment."

In March 2002, Love played the song at a private event in Hollywood, and also allowed a portion of the song to air on an episode of Access Hollywood that she was interviewed in. The latter marked the first time any part of the studio recording had been heard by the general public.

As the lawsuit continued, another description of the studio version appeared in print, in the Spin article The Nirvana Wars, written by DeRogatis and published in June 2002. Like Cross, DeRogatis had been allowed to hear the studio version and other unreleased Nirvana recordings by Love, and described it as "even stronger" than the live version he heard in person at the Aragon Ballroom in 1993.

=== Leak ===
In May 2002, four additional clips of "You Know You're Right" were leaked online, leading some to speculate that it had been placed on advance copies of Grohl's heavy metal side project, Probot. On May 17, Grohl issued a statement denying his involvement in the leak, and that the song was not included on any CD he had compiled or given to anyone.

On September 21, 2002, an unmastered MP3 of the full studio version of "You Know You're Right" was leaked online. The song was quickly put in rotation by a number of alternative rock radio stations, which led to cease-and-desist letters being issued by DGC Records' parent company Geffen Records; a number of stations defied the orders. The Seattle radio station 107.7 The End posted a banner on their website that announced: "We took your e-mails and flooded the server at Geffen Records with tons of choice words about their 'You Know You're Right' cease and desist order. Due to the huge publicity outcry, the label has released the track. Hear NEW Nirvana all this weekend, only on 107.7 The End."

In late September, Love, Grohl and Novoselic released a joint statement announcing that the lawsuit had been settled, and that "You Know You're Right" would be officially released on the Nirvana greatest hits album later that year. It was released as a promotional single, with a music video directed by Chris Hafner. It was rereleased on Nirvana's second greatest hits compilation, Icon, in 2010.

== Composition ==
"You Know You're Right" is an alternative rock song that is three minutes and 38 seconds long. According to the sheet music published at Sheet Music Plus by EMI Music Publishing, it is written in the time signature of common time, with a moderately slow tempo of 84 beats per minute. "You Know You're Right" is composed in the key of F minor, while Kurt Cobain's vocal range spans one octave and three notes. The song follows a basic sequence of F_{5}–D♭–E♭ in the verses and pre-chorus and is mainly restricted to a droning chord of F_{5} throughout the refrain as its chord progression. The journalist Charles R. Cross said it featured the "soft-hard dynamics" of Nirvana's 1993 single "Heart-Shaped Box", with quiet verses followed by a loud screamed chorus.

It follows the usual quiet/loud/quiet pattern of Nirvana songs. The lyrics are sarcastic: "things have never been so swell, I have never failed to fail" and alternating word play between "you know you're right" and "you know your rights".

=== Title ===
"You Know You're Right" did not have an official title at the time of Cobain's death in April 1994. According to Gaar's 2002 Mojo article, it was listed simply as "Kurt's Tune #1" on the tracking sheets from the Robert Lang Studios recording session. The title used by Hole, "You've Got No Right", was the one most commonly used by fans prior to the song's official release.

In the liner notes to Nirvana, Rolling Stone writer David Fricke erroneously states that the song had gone under the previous titles of "Autopilot" and "On a Mountain". The latter title was also cited by Cross in Heavier Than Heaven. These names were actually invented by bootleggers who had misheard Grohl's comment at the beginning of the live version. Grohl had announced, "This is our last song; it's called 'All Apologies'", unaware that Cobain had already started playing "You Know You're Right". Due to the relatively poor fidelity of the live recording, bootleggers believed Grohl had introduced the new song, and tried to interpret what they thought was its title. Cross also seems to misrepresent the lyrics in Heavier Than Heaven, citing the lyric, "I am walking in the piss", which appears in Hole's 1995 version of the song, but in no known Nirvana recording.

== Music video ==
A music video for "You Know You're Right" was released in October 2002. Directed by Chris Hafner, it features a montage of band footage, drawn mostly from live performances and interviews, occasionally edited to give the effect of the song being performed. The video peaked at number two on MTV's most played music videos, as monitored by the Nielsen Broadcast Data Systems, for the week ending October 20, 2002.

== Reception ==
"You Know You're Right" was the fourth Nirvana song to enter the Billboard Hot 100 chart, reaching number 45. It was their fifth song to reach number one on the Billboard Modern Rock Tracks chart, where it remained for four consecutive weeks, the longest of any Nirvana song. With an increase of 1,616 spins, Nirvana also broke the record for the largest detected jump by an act already on the chart. It also became the first Nirvana song to top the Billboard Mainstream Rock Tracks chart. The digital download release also sold well internationally.

Amy McAuliffe from BBC called the song "a poignant reminder of what might have been" and described it as "listening to a dead man snarling out his last gasp of righteous sarcasm." Will Hermes of Spin remarked that it was "amazing how a merely good Nirvana song still scorches everything within earshot." David Samuels of Slate wrote that "unlike most post-mortem rock releases, 'You Know You're Right' is not B-side material or the result of recording studio wizardry—it's a real Nirvana song" that showed that "Cobain was at the peak of his powers as a vocalist and songwriter—the most gifted and popular writer that rock music had seen since Lennon/McCartney." Likewise, Larry Flint from Billboard stated, "Unlike most previously unreleased cuts tacked onto best-of sets, 'You Know You're Right' is a potent addition to Nirvana's cache of classic material."

"You Know You're Right" was ranked as the fifth-best single of the year by Spin, with Charles Aaron calling it a "gnarly little heart-shaped box crammed with feedback, bile, and a gut-shredding chorus." In 2002, the song received a BDS Spin Award for 50,000 radio spins in the US, and in 2003 it received a BDS award for 100,000 radio spins in the US. It was also voted in at number 13 on Poland's LP3 chart in 2002.

== Legacy ==
In 2011, "You Know You're Right" was ranked at number two on NME's list of the 10 best Nirvana songs. In 2015, Rolling Stone listed it at number 21 on their ranking of 102 Nirvana songs. In 2023, it was ranked at number 30 by Stephen Thomas Erlewine on the A.V. Club's "Essential Nirvana: Their 30 greatest songs, ranked" list. Shortly before its release, Kasper described "You Know You're Right" as one of the band's "best songs, probably in the Top Ten."

Grohl reflected on the song in a 2019 interview with The Guardian, telling interviewer Eve Barlow that "I listened to it for the first time in 10 years. Oh God, it's hard to listen to. It was not a pleasant time for the band. Kurt was unwell. Then he was well. Then he was unwell. The last year of the band was tough." In addition to calling the lyrics "heartbreaking" in retrospect, Grohl added that "I used to think it sounded like [Cobain] was singing the chorus. Now I listen to it and it's like he's wailing."

In a 2022 retrospective article on the song, Brad Shoup of Billboard described it as "the most anticipated rock single of 2002," and wrote that its posthumous chart success "was a testament to Kurt Cobain's bone-deep sense of songcraft – and the still-sizable fanbase Nirvana had established before Cobain's April 1994 suicide."

== In popular culture ==
In May 2020, American director Cameron Crowe revealed in an interview with Stereogum that he had hidden the studio recording of "You Know You're Right", given to him by Love, in his film Vanilla Sky, which was released almost a year prior to the song's official release. "We couldn't credit it in the movie and it was actually illegal," Crowe explained, "but Courtney Love gave it to us. She said, 'This is the only Nirvana song that's never been released. Hide it in your movie somewhere.'

In March 2025, a remix of the song appeared in the trailer for the second season of the HBO post-apocalyptic drama television series, The Last of Us.

== Accolades ==
Year	Publication	Country	Accolade	Rank
2003	Spin	United States	Singles of the Year	5
2004	Q	United Kingdom	High Spirits: 10 Greatest Nirvana Songs Ever	9
2011	NME	United Kingdom	Nirvana: Their 10 Best Tracks	2
2019	The Guardian	United Kingdom	Dave Grohl's Landmark Songs	N/A
2023	The A.V. Club	United States	Essential Nirvana: Their 30 greatest songs, ranked	30

== Personnel ==
Nirvana

- Kurt Cobain – guitar, vocals
- Krist Novoselic – bass guitar
- Dave Grohl – drums

Technical

- Adam Kasper – recording and mixing, producer

== Charts ==
=== Weekly charts ===
Chart (2002) (Note: "You Know You're Right" was only released as a downloadable single and no physical single was released at a time when no countries in the world were including downloads in their charts. Therefore all of the song's chart peaks are based on radio airplay including its peak on the Billboard Hot 100 which was earned entirely from its peak on the Billboard Hot 100 Airplay (Radio Songs) component chart of the Hot 100.)	Peak position
Quebec Airplay (ADISQ)	27
UK Airplay Top 100 (ChartsPlus)	85
US Billboard Hot 100	45
US Mainstream Rock Airplay (Billboard)	1
US Alternative Airplay (Billboard)	1
US Active rock (Billboard)	1
US Heritage rock (Billboard)	4
US Rock Top 30 (Radio & Records)	2
US Active rock Top 50 (Radio & Records)	2
US Alternative Top 50 (Radio & Records)	1

=== Year-end charts ===
Chart (2002)	Peak position
US Active rock (Billboard)	42
US Alternative (Billboard)	47
US Rock Top 30 (Radio & Records)	53
US Active rock (Radio & Records)	50
US Alternative (Radio & Records)	57

Chart (2003)	Peak position
US Active rock (Billboard)	36
US Alternative (Billboard)	26
US Heritage rock (Billboard)	32
US Rock Top 30 (Radio & Records)	35
US Active rock (Radio & Records)	40
US Alternative (Radio & Records)	21

== Certifications ==
Sales certifications for "You Know You're Right"
Region	Certification	Certified units/sales
Australia (ARIA)	Gold	35,000^{‡}
New Zealand (RMNZ)	Gold	15,000^{‡}
United States (RIAA)	Gold	500,000^{‡}
^{‡} Sales+streaming figures based on certification alone.

== Recording and release history ==
Six versions of "You Know You're Right" are known to exist: the final studio version along with three rehearsal takes from the same session, the live version from the band's show at the Aragon Ballroom in October 1993, and the solo acoustic demo that appeared on With the Lights Out in November 2004.

=== Demo and studio versions ===
Date recorded	Studio	Producer/recorder	Releases	Personnel
1993	Cobain residence, Seattle, Washington	Kurt Cobain	With the Lights Out (2004); Sliver: The Best of the Box (2005)	Kurt Cobain (vocals, guitar)
January 30, 1994 (Note: In addition to the final version, three rehearsal takes were apparently recorded, but remain unreleased.)	Robert Lang Studios, Seattle, Washington	Adam Kasper	Nirvana (2002); Icon (2010)	Kurt Cobain (vocals, guitar); Krist Novoselic (bass); Dave Grohl (drums)
