= KAOS (FM) =

College-community radio station in Olympia, Washington, US

- Olympia, Washington; United States
- Frequency: 89.3 MHz (HD Radio)

Programming
- Format: Variety
- Affiliations: Pacifica Radio Network

Ownership
- Owner: The Evergreen State College

History
- First air date: January 8, 1973
- Call sign meaning: "Chaos"; reference to the spy agency in the television series Get Smart

Technical information
- Licensing authority: FCC
- Facility ID: 65611
- Class: A
- ERP: 1,250 watts
- HAAT: 74 meters (243 ft)
- Transmitter coordinates: 47°0′58.00″N 122°54′57.00″W

Links
- Public license information: Public file; LMS
- Webcast: Listen live
- Website: www.kaosradio.org

KAOS (89.3 FM) is a hybrid college–community radio station licensed to the Evergreen State College in Olympia, Washington. It broadcasts with an effective radiated power of 1.25 kilowatts, and streams via the internet. The station offers radio broadcasting training to students of the college as well as members of the local community.

== History ==
Dean Katz of The Evergreen State College founded KAOS. When he traveled to Seattle to apply for the station license, his official papers had the radio station's call letters as KESC (for "Evergreen State College.") However, unbeknownst to his adviser and almost everyone else, Katz substituted the initials of the fictional spy agency in the TV show Get Smart. The license was granted under his surprise application, and broadcasts began on January 8, 1973.

The station has been a mainstay in Olympia's local music scene, including a famous early appearance by Skid Row (Nirvana) on May 6, 1987 (their fourth public appearance and first-ever radio broadcast) and a Kurt Cobain solo acoustic performance on September 25, 1990 (both included on the Nirvana box set With the Lights Out).

== Programming ==
KAOS's mission is to present voices that are underrepresented in mainstream media. This includes Native American, Women's, Hispanic, alternative news programs, and independent music. KAOS broadcasts several syndicated public affairs programs from Pacifica Radio, including Amy Goodman's Democracy Now! and David Barsamian's Alternative Radio, as well as original, locally produced public affairs shows. KAOS also features a wide variety of music, including world music, jazz, blues, metal, folk, experimental, garage, psychedelic, electronic, surf, alt-country, prog, free jazz, indie rock, bluegrass, dance, dub, reggae, hip hop, Latino, roots rock, R&B, and more.

=== Music policy ===
KAOS instituted an independent music policy in its early years. The policy requires that at least 80% of the music broadcast on the station must be from sources other than the major record labels and their subsidiaries.

== Former DJs ==
Over the years, the station has had many former DJs go onto more fame, Bruce Pavitt (founder of Sub Pop Records), Tobi Vail, Lois Maffeo, Mark Hosler (of Negativland), Arrington de Dionyso (of Old Time Relijun), Steve Fisk (producer and musician), Jeff Jacoby (sound artist & producer of The Traveling Radio Show), Tom Hood (founder of Hood's Woods Music), Calvin Johnson (of Beat Happening and founder of K Records), and John Foster (founder of OP Magazine).

== See also ==
- List of college radio stations in the United States
- List of community radio stations in the United States
