= The Songs of Kurt Cobain =

- The wooden heart-shaped box set

Box set by Nirvana
- Released: 2007
- Recorded: 1988–1994
- Genre: Grunge; alternative rock; punk rock
- Label: Primary Wave

Alternative cover
- Outer packaging of the box

The Songs of Kurt Cobain is a 5-disc CD box set of music by the American rock band Nirvana, released as a promo only in 2007. The first three CDs feature songs by Nirvana themselves, while the last two discs feature covers by 11 other artists as well as seven "lullaby" and six "string" renditions of the band's songs.

== Release ==
The Songs of Kurt Cobain was released by Primary Wave, who had acquired the rights to the Nirvana frontman's compositions from his widow Courtney Love in early 2007 for the purpose of promoting interest in licensing his work. The cover versions were recorded by artists such as Sinéad O'Connor ("All Apologies") and Tori Amos ("Smells Like Teen Spirit"). Scala & Kolacny Brothers' cover of "Smells Like Teen Spirit" was later used in the documentary Kurt Cobain: Montage of Heck in 2015.

The release is highly valued by collectors, having been limited to a run of 500 copies.

== Packaging ==
Each CD in the box set has a custom-printed picture and they are housed in a heart-shaped, hand-carved wooden music box with Kurt Cobain's caricature logo etched on the lid and Primary Wave's logo on the side. When the lid is removed it plays the intro bars of the Nirvana song "Heart-Shaped Box". Each box set also comes with a booklet and individually numbered certificate.

== Reception ==
Despite having become a sought-after collector's item, Tiny Mix Tapes gave the release a poor review in November 2007.

== Track listings ==
=== CD 1 ===
All tracks are written by Kurt Cobain except where noted.

No.	Title	Writer(s)	Original release	Length
1.	"Smells Like Teen Spirit"	Cobain, Krist Novoselic, Dave Grohl	Nevermind (1991)	5:01
2.	"In Bloom"		Nevermind	4:14
3.	"Come as You Are"		Nevermind	3:39
4.	"Breed"		Nevermind	3:03
5.	"Lithium"		Nevermind	4:17
6.	"On a Plain"		Nevermind	3:16
7.	"Pennyroyal Tea"		In Utero (1993)	3:36
8.	"Heart-Shaped Box"		In Utero	4:39
9.	"About a Girl"		Bleach (1989)	2:48
10.	"Polly"		Nevermind	2:57
11.	"Something in the Way"		Nevermind	3:52
12.	"Dumb"		In Utero	2:29
13.	"All Apologies"		In Utero	3:50
14.	"You Know You're Right"		Nirvana (2002)	3:38
15.	"Something in the Way"		MTV Unplugged in New York (1994)	4:01
16.	"Pennyroyal Tea"		MTV Unplugged in New York	3:40

=== CD 2 ===
All tracks are written by Kurt Cobain.

No.	Title	Original release	Length
1.	"Blew"	Bleach	2:56
2.	"Floyd the Barber"	Bleach	2:18
3.	"School"	Bleach	2:42
4.	"Mr Moustache"	Bleach	3:24
5.	"Negative Creep"	Bleach	2:56
6.	"Dive"	Incesticide (1992)	3:55
7.	"Sliver"	Incesticide	2:16
8.	"Been a Son"	Incesticide	2:22
9.	"(New Wave) Polly"	Incesticide	1:48
10.	"Territorial Pissings"	Nevermind	2:22
11.	"Drain You"	Nevermind	3:43
12.	"Lounge Act"	Nevermind	2:36
13.	"Stay Away"	Nevermind	3:32
14.	"Serve the Servants"	In Utero	3:36
15.	"Sappy"	No Alternative (1993)	3:24

=== CD 3 ===
All tracks are written by Kurt Cobain except where noted.

No.	Title	Writer(s)	Original release	Length
1.	"Swap Meet"		Bleach	3:03
2.	"Downer"		Bleach	1:43
3.	"Aero Zeppelin"		Incesticide	4:41
4.	"Big Long Now"		Incesticide	5:03
5.	"Aneurysm"	Cobain, Novoselic, Grohl	Incesticide	4:35
6.	"Scentless Apprentice"	Cobain, Novoselic, Grohl	In Utero	3:48
7.	"Rape Me"		In Utero	2:49
8.	"Frances Farmer Will Have Her Revenge on Seattle"		In Utero	4:09
9.	"Very Ape"		In Utero	4:09
10.	"Milk It"		In Utero	3:55
11.	"Tourettes"		In Utero	1:35
12.	"Come as You Are"		MTV Unplugged in New York	4:13
13.	"Dumb"		MTV Unplugged in New York	2:52

=== CD 4 ===
All tracks are written by Kurt Cobain except where noted.

No.	Title	Writer(s)	Performing artist	Length
1.	"Lithium"		The Polyphonic Spree
2.	"Smells Like Teen Spirit"	Cobain, Novoselic, Grohl	Paul Anka
3.	"Smells Like Teen Spirit"	Cobain, Novoselic, Grohl	Scala & Kolacny Brothers
4.	"Smells Like Teen Spirit"	Cobain, Novoselic, Grohl	Tori Amos
5.	"Smells Like Teen Spirit"	Cobain, Novoselic, Grohl	Patti Smith
6.	"Smells Like Teen Spirit"	Cobain, Novoselic, Grohl	Feat Morel-Desmond Williams
7.	"Come as You Are"		Charlie Hunter trio
8.	"Breed"		Steve Earle
9.	"All Apologies"		Herbie Hancock
10.	"All Apologies"		Sinéad O'Connor
11.	"Something in the Way"		Stereophonics

=== CD 5 ===
All tracks are written by Kurt Cobain except where noted.

No.	Title	Writer(s)	Performing artist	Length
1.	"Come as You Are"		Lullaby rendition by Michael Armstrong
2.	"In Bloom"		Lullaby rendition by Michael Armstrong
3.	"Lithium"		Lullaby rendition by Michael Armstrong
4.	"Something in the Way"		Lullaby rendition by Michael Armstrong
5.	"About a Girl"		Lullaby rendition by Michael Armstrong
6.	"Heart-Shaped Box"		Lullaby rendition by Michael Armstrong
7.	"All Apologies"		Lullaby rendition by Michael Armstrong
8.	"Smells Like Teen Spirit"	Cobain, Novoselic, Grohl	The Tallywood Strings
9.	"Come as You Are"		The Tallywood Strings
10.	"In Bloom"		The Tallywood Strings
11.	"Lounge Act"		The Tallywood Strings
12.	"Polly"		The Tallywood Strings
13.	"Something in the Way"		The Tallywood Strings
