= Icon (Nirvana album) =

Greatest hits album by Nirvana
- Released: August 31, 2010
- Recorded: 1991–1994
- Genre: Grunge
- Length: 41:21
- Label: Geffen, UM^{ɵ}

Nirvana chronology
Live at Reading (2009)	Icon (2010)	Live at the Paramount (2011)

Icon is the second greatest hits album by the American rock band Nirvana, released on August 31, 2010. It was released as part of the Icon series launched by Universal Music Enterprises, which featured greatest hits releases "from 30 major artists spanning rock, pop, R&B and country."

== Contents ==
As with the band's first greatest hits compilation Nirvana, released in 2002, the otherwise chronological album opens with "You Know You're Right", which was first released on Nirvana, and recorded during the band's final studio session in January 1994. This is followed by the four singles from the band's second album and major label debut, Nevermind ("Smells Like Teen Spirit", "Come as You Are", "Lithium" and "In Bloom"), three singles from their 1993 third album In Utero ("Heart-Shaped Box", "Pennyroyal Tea" and "Rape Me"), and the In Utero album track, "Dumb". It also includes the MTV Unplugged versions of "About a Girl", which was released as a single to promote the album MTV Unplugged in New York in October 1994, and "All Apologies", which was released as a promotional single.

Unlike Nirvana, Icon contains no material originally released on the band's first record label, Sub Pop, replacing the studio recording of "About a Girl" with the MTV Unplugged version, and no cover versions.

== Reception ==
Professional ratings
Review scores
Source	Rating
AllMusic	4/5 stars

Stephen Thomas Erlewine of AllMusic called the album "a concise, enjoyable collection that doesn’t dig deep but does give casual fans what they want."

== Track listing ==
All tracks are written by Kurt Cobain; track 2 co-written with Dave Grohl and Krist Novoselic.

No.	Title	Album	Length
1.	"You Know You're Right"	Nirvana	3:37
2.	"Smells Like Teen Spirit"	Nevermind	5:02
3.	"Come As You Are"	Nevermind	3:40
4.	"Lithium"	Nevermind	4:17
5.	"In Bloom"	Nevermind	4:15
6.	"Heart-Shaped Box"	In Utero	4:40
7.	"Pennyroyal Tea" (Scott Litt Remix)	In Utero	3:36
8.	"Rape Me"	In Utero	2:50
9.	"Dumb"	In Utero	2:31
10.	"About a Girl"	MTV Unplugged in New York	3:08
11.	"All Apologies"	MTV Unplugged in New York	3:45
Total length:			41:21

== Personnel ==
- Kurt Cobain – vocals, guitar
- Krist Novoselic – bass guitar
- Dave Grohl – drums, backing vocals on "In Bloom" and the MTV Unplugged tracks
- Pat Smear – guitar on the MTV Unplugged tracks
- Lori Goldston – cello on "All Apologies"
- Kera Schaley – cello on "Dumb"

== Charts ==
Chart (2010)	Peak position
Greek Albums (IFPI Greece)	37

Chart (2017)	Peak position
US Top Catalog Albums (Billboard)	46

== Certifications ==
Region	Certification	Certified units/sales
Canada (Music Canada)	Gold	40,000^{^}
^{^} Shipments figures based on certification alone.
