= Dumb (Nirvana song) =

1993 song by Nirvana

Song by Nirvana

from the album In Utero
- Released: September 21, 1993
- Recorded: February 13–26, 1993
- Studio: Pachyderm (Cannon Falls, Minnesota)
- Genre: Chamber punk
- Length: 2:29
- Label: DGC
- Songwriter: Kurt Cobain
- Producer: Steve Albini

In Utero track listing
- 12 tracks: 1. "Serve the Servants"; 2. "Scentless Apprentice"; 3. "Heart-Shaped Box"; 4. "Rape Me"; 5. "Frances Farmer Will Have Her Revenge on Seattle"; 6. "Dumb"; 7. "Very Ape"; 8. "Milk It"; 9. "Pennyroyal Tea"; 10. "Radio Friendly Unit Shifter"; 11. "tourette's" 12. "All Apologies"

Music video
- "Dumb" on YouTube

"Dumb" is a song by the American rock band, Nirvana, written by vocalist and guitarist, Kurt Cobain. It is the sixth song on the band's third and final studio album, In Utero, released in September 1993.

In a 1993 Melody Maker interview, Cobain explained that the song was about people who lacked the intelligence to be unhappy, which he admitted he was "at times" envious of.

The In Utero version features a cello part, written and performed by Chicago musician Kera Schaley, a friend of the album's producer, Steve Albini. Schaley never toured with the band, but all live versions of the song during the In Utero tour featured cello, performed by Lori Goldston during the American leg of the tour, and Melora Creager during the European leg.

Despite never being released as a single, "Dumb" reached number 37 on the US Alternative National Airplay chart, which was published by Radio & Records. In October 2023, an animated music video for the song by RuffMercy was released on Nirvana's official YouTube channel, to promote the 30th anniversary of In Utero.

== Early history ==
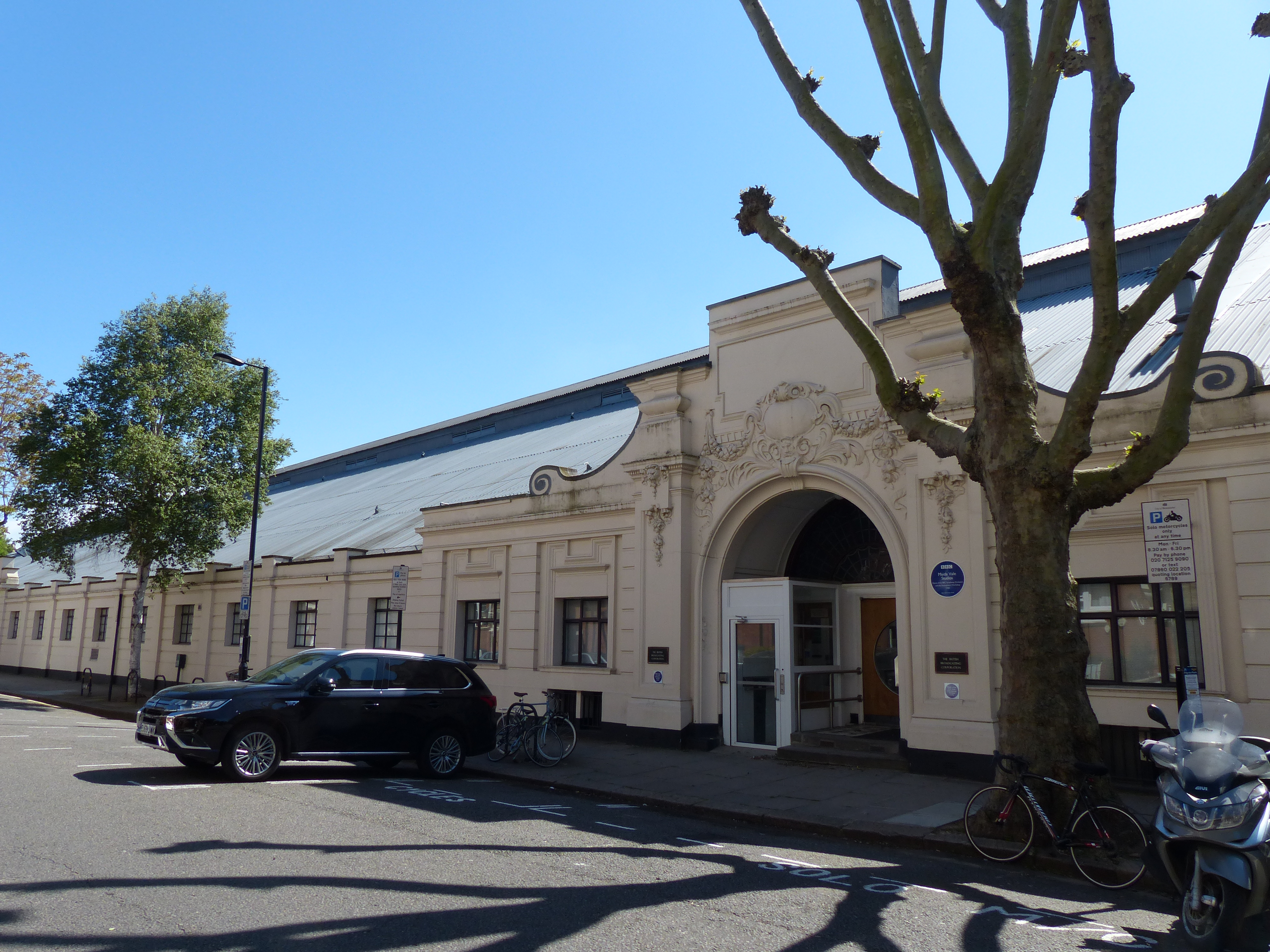
Nirvana recorded a version of "Dumb" for the BBC at Maida Vale Studios, England, in September 1991, two years before the song's official release on In Utero.

"Dumb" was written by Cobain in the summer of 1990, as the band began to move away from the heavier grunge sound of their debut album, Bleach, towards more openly melodic, pop-influenced material. Two lyrics sheets for the song were published posthumously in Journals in November 2002, one under the working title of "I Think I'm Dumb," with a note that the lyrics were "Not Finished," and the titles of two songs by Scottish rock band the Vaselines, "Molly's Lips" and "Slushy," written under the title with no explanation. In a 2023 interview, Courtney Love stated that Cobain had written the song in just 20 minutes, during a trip to Amsterdam.

"Dumb" was debuted live on September 25, 1990, when Cobain performed a solo acoustic version on the Boy Meets Girl show, hosted by Calvin Johnson of the American rock band Beat Happening, on KAOS (FM) in Olympia, Washington. The first live version featuring the full band was at the Off Ramp Café in Seattle, Washington on November 25, 1990.

On September 3, 1991, the band recorded a version of the song, already featuring finished lyrics, during their second John Peel session for the BBC at Maida Vale Studios in London. The full session, which also featured versions of "Drain You" and "Endless Nameless" from their then-latest release, Nevermind, was produced by Dale Griffin, and first broadcast on November 3, 1991. "Dumb" and "Endless, Nameless" from this session were posthumously released on the Nirvana rarities box set, With the Lights Out, in November 2004.

Three studio versions of "Dumb" were recorded by Jack Endino on October 26, 1992, at Word of Mouth in Seattle, Washington, but all were instrumental, as were all the other songs recorded during this session, except for one take of the eventual In Utero single, "Rape Me". One of these instrumental takes was released on the 20th anniversary "Deluxe" and "Super Deluxe" editions of In Utero in September 2013.

== "In Utero" ==
The final studio version of "Dumb" was recorded by Steve Albini at Pachyderm Studios in Cannon Falls, Minnesota in February 1993, during the recording sessions for In Utero. The song's guitar, bass and drums were recorded on February 15, the third day of the sessions. All vocals for the album were recorded by Cobain during a single session the following day.

In a 2013 interview for the audio series Spotify Landmark, Albini recalled replacing drummer Dave Grohl's bass drum on "Dumb" and "Pennyroyal Tea" with a small one "with a full-front head on it, so that it had a very sort of bouncy, jazzy sound, as opposed to the sort of more percussive, more hard rock sound on the rest of the record."

=== Cello ===
The In Utero recording of "Dumb" features cello by Kera Schaley, a friend of Albini's who also played on the album's second single and closing track, "All Apologies", as well as an unreleased take of the eventual b-side, "Marigold". As Schaley recalled in a 2010 interview with Swan Fungus, "I went to the studio ... and Steve played the song 'Dumb' for me. I wrote a part for it and then Kurt came in and listened, told me what to leave out and what to keep. Then he asked me to play around with 'All Apologies'." In 2023, she shared her recollection of hearing the song for the first time, telling Rolling Stone's Brian Hiatt, "I remember I heard 'Dumb' and then when Kurt came in, I looked at him and I said, 'This is a really beautiful song.' And I think he might've thought that was funny, but he was like, 'Thank you.'" According to Schaley, the final cello line for the song was recorded in about three takes.

== Post-In Utero ==
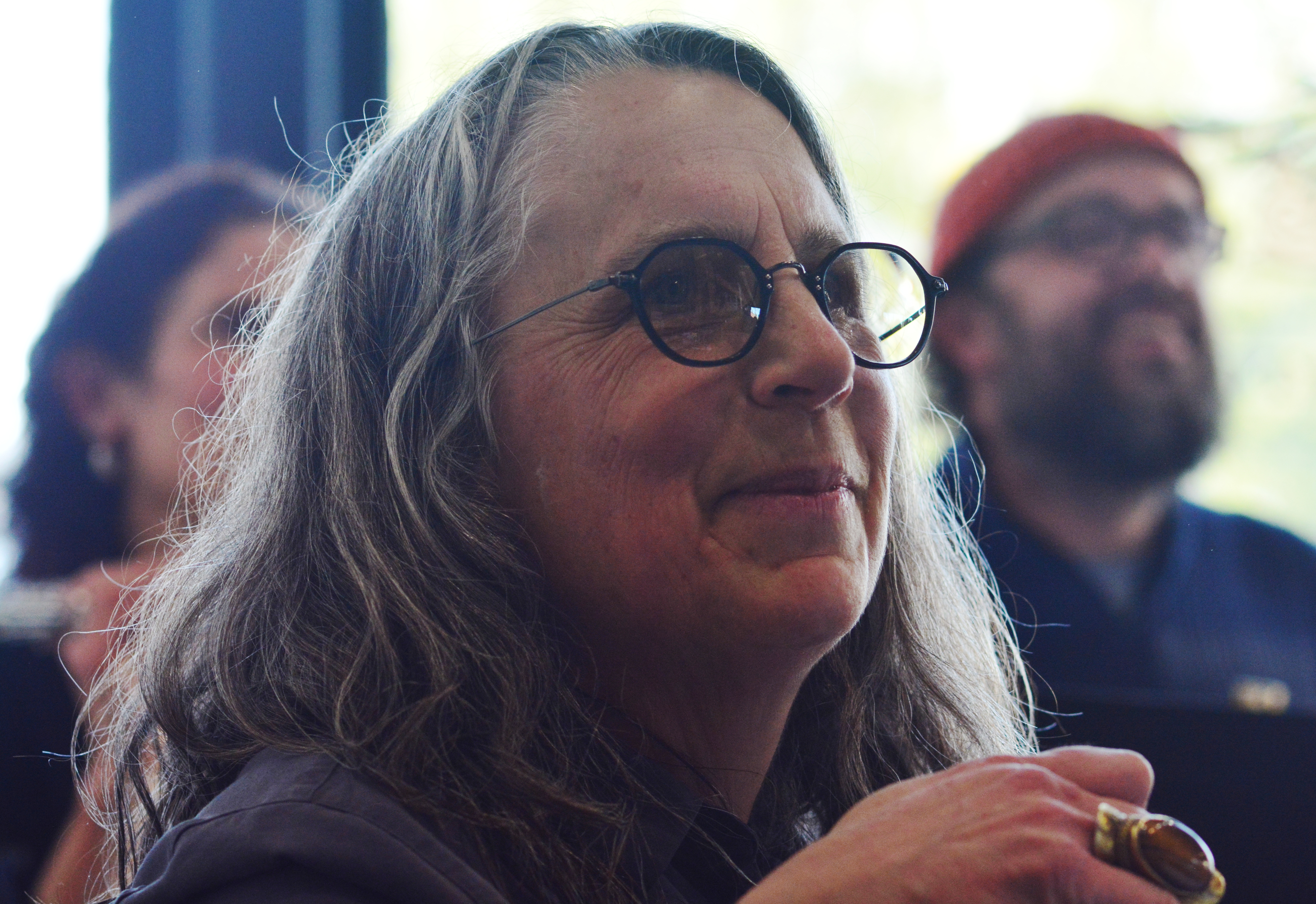
Lori Goldston, pictured in 2024, played cello on live versions of "Dumb" during the American leg of Nirvana's 1993 In Utero tour, including at their MTV Unplugged performance.

Nirvana performed an acoustic version of the song during their MTV Unplugged performance on November 18, 1993 at Sony Music Studios in New York City. This version featured Pat Smear on second guitar and Lori Goldston on cello.

It was performed, alongside the In Utero song, "Serve the Servants," at Nirvana's final television appearance, on February 23, 1994 in Rome, Italy for the RAI television show, Tunnel. This version of the song featured Melora Creager on cello.

"Dumb" was performed for the final time live at Nirvana's last concert, at Terminal Einz in Munich, Germany on March 1, 1994.

== Composition and lyrics ==
=== Music ===
Journalist Gillian G. Gaar noted that "Dumb" was one of the few Nirvana songs to remain "low-key from beginning to end," comparing it to the Bleach song, "About a Girl." Like "About a Girl," the song has been described as "Beatlesesque." Nirvana bassist Krist Novoselic called it "a beautiful song. That's a really good one. I like the BBC version of the song. It's real raw, but still the beauty is strong. A sweet pop song."

Describing the In Utero version, John Mulvey of the NME wrote that the song "broods and circles, with the aid of a cello, like a baroque parody of 'Lithium'. Again and again it builds up and up, primed to explode into a moshing sweatfest of a chorus, and again and again it ducks away from that commercially lucrative macho bonding rite." Likewise, Jim Bevigilia of American Songwriter wrote that "the recording of the song on In Utero is all coiled tension. Even though you expect Cobain’s guitar to come crashing through to break it, it never quite does. Instead, a cello runs counterpoint to the steady rhythm section of Krist Novoselic and Dave Grohl and to the protagonist’s insistence that maybe he’s happy after all."

=== Lyrics ===
In a 1993 interview with Melody Maker, Cobain explained that the song was "just about people who're easily amused, people who not only aren't capable of progressing their intelligence but are totally happy watching 10 hours of television and really enjoy it. I've met a lot of dumb people. They have a shitty job, they may be totally lonely, they don't have a girlfriend, they don't have much of a social life, and yet, for some reason, they're happy."

Though written before Cobain's addiction to heroin, "Dumb" is also one of the few Nirvana songs to directly reference drug use, specifically inhalants. In Cobain's unused liner notes for the song, he blamed "all that supposedly unaddictive, harmless" marijuana for harming his nerves and damaging his memory, saying it "wasn't ever strong enough" which led him to "climb the ladder" to heroin.

In 2015, Kurt's daughter, Frances Bean Cobain, offered her own interpretation of the song in an interview with Rolling Stone, saying, "I cry every time I hear that song. It's a stripped-down version of Kurt's perception of himself – of himself on drugs, off drugs, feeling inadequate to be titled the voice of a generation."

== Release and reception ==
Though never released as a single, "Dumb" has become a popular song on American alternative rock radio, and was played on European radio. It was ranked at number 39 on WHFS's top 100 played songs of 1994, number 41 on KROQ-FM’s top 100 played songs of 1994, number 56 on Q101's top 100 played songs of 1994, and number 82 on 91X's top 100 played songs of 1994. "Dumb" was also ranked at number 381 on Live 105's Top 500 songs in 1994, as well as at number 266 on Live 105's Top 300 Revolutionary songs in 1995, and also at number 220 on WHFS's Top 500 songs of the 90s in 1999. The combined airplay in 1994 allowed the song to chart at number 37 on the US Alternative National Airplay chart which was published by Radio & Records.

In a 1993 Rolling Stone interview, Cobain told journalist David Fricke that he wished he had put more songs like "Dumb" and "All Apologies" on previous Nirvana albums, saying that Nirvana had so far "failed in showing the lighter, more dynamic side of our band."

=== Critical reception ===
In his review of In Utero for Rolling Stone, Fricke cited "Dumb", along with "Heart-Shaped Box", as evidence that if Generation X "is ever going to have its own Lennon – someone who genuinely believes in rock & roll salvation but doesn't confuse mere catharsis with true deliverance – Cobain is damn near it." Reviewing the album for Kerrang!, Phil Alexander wrote that "Kurt kickstarts 'Rape Me' with a familiar and doubtlessly intended '...Teen Spirit' shuffle, while 'Dumb' has an infectious 'Come As You Are' feel. Both ripple with Kurt's poignant observations, allowing fleeting glimpses at his anger and frustration without ever resorting to the trite and obvious."

=== Legacy ===
Reviewing the band's first greatest hits album, Nirvana, in 2002, Will Bryant of Pitchfork wrote that "Dumb" was "one of Cobain's most underrated efforts, a populist revision of "Lithium" that replaces Nevermind's misanthropy with earnest self-deprecation." Bryant praised Kera Schaley's cello playing as the song's "secret weapon," and the bridge as "hands down, Cobain's best."

In 2004, "Dumb" was ranked number seven in Q's list of the "10 Greatest Nirvana Songs Ever". In 2011, NME ranked it sixth on their list of the Nirvana's "10 Best Tracks". In 2015, it was listed at number 20 on Rolling Stone's ranking of 102 Nirvana songs. In 2019, The Guardian ranked it ninth on their list of "Nirvana's 20 greatest songs". In 2023, Stephen Thomas Erlewine ranked it the 24th best Nirvana song on the A.V. Club's "Essential Nirvana: Their 30 greatest songs, ranked" list.

"Dumb" was re-released on the band's second greatest hits collection, Icon, in August 2010.

In 2017, to mark what would have been Cobain's 50th birthday, the Phonographic Performance Limited released a list of the top 20 most played Nirvana songs on the TV and radio in the United Kingdom, in which "Dumb" was ranked at number 19.

== Music video ==
On October 13, 2023, an animated music video for "Dumb" was released on Nirvana's official YouTube channel. The video was directed by RuffMercy, and created using hand-painted Super 8 film.

The video was nominated for a 2024 Webby Award for Art & Experimental Videos.

== Charts ==
Chart (1993–1994)	Peak position
UK Airplay Top 100 (Hit Music); In Utero version	92
US Alternative National Airplay (Radio & Records); In Utero version	37

== Certifications ==
Region	Certification	Certified units/sales
Australia (ARIA)	Platinum	70,000^{‡}
New Zealand (RMNZ)	Platinum	30,000^{‡}
United Kingdom (BPI) Sales since 2004	Silver	200,000^{‡}
United States (RIAA)	Gold	500,000^{‡}
^{‡} Sales+streaming figures based on certification alone.

== Accolades ==
Year	Publication	Country	Accolade	Rank
2004	Q	United Kingdom	High Spirits: 10 Greatest Nirvana Songs Ever	7
2011	NME	United Kingdom	Nirvana: Their 10 Best Tracks	6
2019	The Guardian	United Kingdom	Nirvana's 20 greatest songs - ranked!	9
2023	The A.V. Club	United States	Essential Nirvana: Their 30 greatest songs, ranked	24

== Personnel ==
Nirvana

- Kurt Cobain – vocals, guitars
- Krist Novoselic – bass
- Dave Grohl – drums

Additional personnel

- Kera Schaley – cello

== Other releases ==
- A live version, recorded at the 1992 Reading Festival on October 30, 1992, appeared on Live at Reading, released on CD and DVD in November 2009.
- A remix of the In Utero version, done by Albini in 2013, appeared on the 20th anniversary "Deluxe" and "Super Deluxe" versions of In Utero.
- A brief clip of the song, from the band's performance at the Springfield Civic Center in Springfield, Massachusetts on November 10, 1993, appeared on side four of the vinyl version of the live compilation, From the Muddy Banks of the Wishkah, released in November 1996. The clip featured Cobain stopping the song after accidentally repeating the second verse, apologizing to the audience, and then starting again.
- Two live versions of the song, from the band's concerts at the Great Western Forum in Inglewood, California on December 30, 1993, and at the Seattle Center Arena in Seattle on January 7, 1994, appeared on the 30th anniversary "Super Deluxe" reissue of In Utero, released in October 2023.

=== Unreleased versions ===
- The solo acoustic version recorded on the Boy Meets Girl show in Olympia on September 25, 1990 was leaked on the internet in 2016, but remains unreleased.
- The live version recorded for Tunnel in Rome on February 23, 1994 also remains officially unreleased. However, it was released on the bootleg Live at Tunnel Rome Italy 23 Feb 1994 which reached number 93 on the UK Physical Singles Chart in May 2025.

== Cover versions ==
In 2016, Best Coast covered the song for Summer Is Forever 2.

== Bibliography ==
- Azerrad, Michael (1993). Come as You Are: The Story of Nirvana. Doubleday. ISBN 0-385-47199-8.
- Crisafulli, Chuck (1996). Nirvana: The Stories Behind the Songs. Omnibus Press. ISBN 0-7119-5809-2.
- Gaar, Gillian G (2006). In Utero. Continuum Publishing. ISBN 0-8264-1776-0.
- Gaar, Gillian G (2009). The Rough Guide to Nirvana. Penguin Books. ISBN 978-1-85828-945-8.
- St. Thomas, Kurt; Smith, Troy (2004). Nirvana: The Chosen Rejects. St. Martin's Press. ISBN 0-312-20663-1.
