= Serve the Servants =

1993 song by Nirvana

- Single cover art by Kurt Cobain

Song by Nirvana

from the album In Utero
- Released: September 21, 1993
- Recorded: February 13–26, 1993
- Studio: Pachyderm, Cannon Falls, Minnesota
- Genre: Grunge
- Length: 3:36
- Label: DGC
- Songwriter: Kurt Cobain
- Producer: Steve Albini

In Utero track listing
- 12 tracks: 1. "Serve the Servants"; 2. "Scentless Apprentice"; 3. "Heart-Shaped Box"; 4. "Rape Me"; 5. "Frances Farmer Will Have Her Revenge on Seattle"; 6. "Dumb"; 7. "Very Ape"; 8. "Milk It"; 9. "Pennyroyal Tea"; 10. "Radio Friendly Unit Shifter"; 11. "tourette's" 12. "All Apologies"

"Serve the Servants" is a song by the American rock band Nirvana, written by vocalist and guitarist, Kurt Cobain. It is the first track on their third and final studio album In Utero, released in September 1993.

The song has frequently been cited for its autobiographical lyrics, which address the band's fame following the release of their 1991 album, Nevermind, the divorce of Cobain's parents, and perceived media attacks against Cobain's wife, American rock musician, Courtney Love.

== Early history ==
"Serve the Servants" was written in 1992. The earliest known version is a home demo, featuring Cobain on vocals and acoustic guitar, recorded on a boombox in 1992. This version was released on the posthumous Nirvana box set, With the Lights Out, in November 2004.

== In Utero ==
"Serve the Servants" was the only In Utero song that had never been recorded as a demo by the full band prior to being recorded for the album. As Nirvana's bassist Krist Novoselic remembers, it was brought to the studio "pretty much done" by Cobain. The album was recorded in February 1993 by Steve Albini at Pachyderm Studio in Cannon Falls, Minnesota.

In a September 2013 interview with the NPR program All Songs Considered, Novoselic recalled that "Serve the Servants" was the first song the band recorded during the sessions with Albini. "And so we play that song 'Serve the Servants,'" he explained, "...And so we finish the song, and Kurt and Dave and I look at each other and we're like, 'Yeah, that felt pretty good. How was it, Steve?' He's like, 'Sounds good.' And we're like, 'All right! We're going to do another song,' like in one take. We won Steve over after that."

== Post-In Utero ==
The first live performance of "Serve the Servants" was on April 9, 1993, at the Bosnian Rape Victim Benefit show at the Cow Palace in San Francisco, California.

It was performed, along with "Dumb," at Nirvana's final television appearance, on February 23, 1994 in Rome, Italy for the RAI television show, Tunnel.

The final live performance of "Serve the Servants" was at Nirvana's last concert, on March 1, 1994, at Terminal 1 of the closed Munich-Riem Airport in Munich, Germany.

== Composition and lyrics ==
=== Music ===
Journalist Gillian G. Gaar described "Serve the Servants" as "a straight-ahead rock song, arguably the most straightforward song on In Utero," and noted that its steady volume was a departure from the frequently-used "soft/loud Nirvana dynamic." John Mulvey of the NME called it "an addictive pop song" that was "set to a jerky, cranking riff that gleefully degenerates into a squiggly anti-solo." Jim DeRogatis of Chicago Sun-Times described it as being "propelled by fat, hummable guitar riffs and memorable singalong choruses." Author Chuck Crisafulli called it one of the most "rock n' roll" tracks the band ever recorded that provided an energizing and satisfying opener to In Utero, which immediately dispelled rumors that the album would be excessively abrasive and unlistenable.

=== Lyrics ===
The song's autobiographical lyrics address both Cobain's struggles with fame and his family life. The opening lyrics, "Teenage angst has paid off well, now I'm bored and old," were a commentary on Cobain's public image, and his life as a celebrity since the unexpected success of Nirvana's second album, Nevermind, released in September 1991. The lyric, "If she floats then she is not a witch like we had thought", was an attack on the media for its perceived misrepresentation of Cobain's wife Courtney Love, vocalist and guitarist of the American rock band Hole, comparing her treatment to a witchhunt and the practice of subjecting women accused of witchcraft to a public ordeal by water.

In his 1993 biography Come as You Are: The Story of Nirvana, Michael Azerrad stated that Cobain sent a personal and direct message to his father with the lines, "I tried hard to have a father, but instead I had a dad/ I just want you to know that I don't hate you anymore/There is nothing I could say that I haven't thought before". However, Cobain stated that the lines were included at the last minute and that "they just happen to fit really well". Author Charles R. Cross, in his 2001 Cobain biography, Heavier Than Heaven, also described these lines as bitter lyrics aimed at Cobain's father. The last line of the chorus. "that legendary divorce is such a bore", refers to Cobain being tired of his childhood being plumbed for deep meaning.

== Reception ==
The song's opening lyrics attracted the attention of numerous critics in contemporary reviews of the album. John Mulvey of the NME wrote that "any album that kicks off with a song as beautifully bludgeoned as ‘Serve The Servants’, and a line as tellingly funny as 'Teenage angst has paid off well/ Now I’m bored and old', must have something going for it. Self-referential and self-pitying, for sure, but here at least Nirvana metaphorically wipe their arses on old Nevermind sleeves with a little wit to leaven the whingeing bitterness." David Fricke of Rolling Stone wrote that the opening lines of the album's "petulant, bludgeoning opener" were "sung in an irritated, marble-mouthed snarl that immediately derails any lingering expectations for a son of “Smells Like Teen Spirit." Predicting the first lines as "soon-to-be-famous," Los Angeles Times writer Chris Willman wrote, "If you’d guess from that opening that Cobain is going to spend a lot of the record commenting sarcastically on the success and attention he’s enjoyed (not) in the last couple of years, you’d be positively prescient." Tom Howard, from the same publication, wrote that "‘Serve The Servants’ features the best opening line to any album ever ... Kurt was self-aware to a fault, and this is a prime example. It’s an added bonus that the track is an admirably obnoxious hard rock banger."

In his September 1993 review of the album for Time, Christopher John Farley wrote that compared to "Heart-Shaped Box" and "All Apologies," the two songs later remixed by Scott Litt at the band's request, "many of the Albini pieces sound ravaged, almost ruined; but as with buried treasures, there are rewards for persistence and exploration. If you listen repeatedly to such sonically explosive songs as Serve the Servants and Pennyroyal Tea, the structure of each gradually becomes clear, and melodies surface." David Cavanagh compared the song to "Rid Of Me," the title track of the second studio album by English rock musician PJ Harvey, released in May 1993 and also produced by Albini." Stuart Berman for Pitchfork remarked, "The scowling verses of “Serve the Servants” are countered by the chorus’ soothing incantation of the song’s title, as if Cobain had to anesthetize himself in order to answer his audience’s populist demands."

=== Legacy ===
Reviewing the 20th anniversary reissue of In Utero in September 2013, Christopher John Farley of Time wrote that "compared to songs on Nevermind, 'Serve the Servants' and 'tourette’s' sound unmixed and unfinished, but not as a detriment. These songs and others on In Utero sound completely fresh and unaffected, and end up creating a much rougher and stripped-down result.

In August 2014, Paste ranked "Serve the Servants" at number 37 on their "50 Best Grunge Songs" list, with Michael Danaher writing, “The verse’s warbling surfer-esque riff and the chorus’s raw, coarse hook was a masterwork that furthered Cobain’s knack for bruised and brooding songwriting." In April 2015, Rolling Stone ranked “Serve the Servants” at number 14 on their list of the top 102 Nirvana songs, with writer Douglas Wolk remarking, “The dissonant blast that opened In Utero's first seconds answered anyone who wondered if Nirvana was going to soften up after conquering the world." The A.V. Club ranked it at number 17 on their list of the band's "30 greatest songs" in 2023.

In 2017, Love cited "Serve the Servants" as one of her favorite Nirvana songs, also mentioning the In Utero songs "Heart-Shaped Box" and "Frances Farmer Will Have Her Revenge on Seattle", and the Nevermind songs "In Bloom" and "On a Plain."

According to the April 2000 edition of Spin, at one point during Cobain's memorial vigil in April 1994, the song was being "blasted" from the loudspeakers while "an estimated 5,000 kids poured over the fountain, plugging up the spigots, lifting their middle fingers to the skies and howling with gleeful rage."

The song's title is referenced by Nirvana's manager Danny Goldberg in the title of his book Serving The Servant: Remembering Kurt Cobain, released in 2019.

== Personnel ==
- Kurt Cobain – guitar, vocals
- Krist Novoselic – bass
- Dave Grohl – drums

== Accolades ==
Year	Publication	Country	Accolade	Rank
2023	The A.V. Club	United States	Essential Nirvana: Their 30 greatest songs, ranked	17

== Other releases ==
- A remix of the studio version, done by Albini in 2013, appeared on the 20th anniversary "Deluxe" and "Super Deluxe" versions of In Utero in September 2013. Reviewing the reissue in September 2013, Stuart Berman of Pitchfork wrote that "the unearthed cello lines creeping behind the chorus of 'Serve the Servants'" in the 2013 mix brought "a greater sense of melancholy to the fore."
- A live version, recorded at Pier 48 in Seattle on December 13, 1993, was released on the live video Live and Loud in September 2013. An edited version of the show, including "Serve the Servants," first aired on MTV on December 31, 1993.
- Three live versions will appear on the 30th anniversary "Super Deluxe" reissue of In Utero, set to be released in October 2023. The set will include the band's full shows at the Great Western Forum in Inglewood, California on December 30, 1993, and at the Seattle Center Arena in Seattle on January 7, 1994, both of which featured versions of "Serve the Servants." An additional live version, recorded on February 22, 1994 at Palaghiaccio in Marino, Italy, will appear as bonus material.
- The live version performed on Tunnel in Rome in February 23, 1994 was released as bonus material on Live and Loud. This version was also released on the bootleg Live at Tunnel Rome Italy 23 Feb 1994 which reached number 93 on the UK Physical Singles Chart in May 2025.
