= Nirvana (Nirvana album) =

Greatest hits album by Nirvana
- Released: October 29, 2002
- Recorded: 1988–1994
- Genre: Grunge; alternative rock
- Length: 49:38 (US and Japanese CD); 54:46 (International CD)
- Label: DGC
- Producer: Steve Albini; Jack Endino; Steve Fisk; Scott Litt; Butch Vig

Nirvana chronology
From the Muddy Banks of the Wishkah (1996)	Nirvana (2002)	With the Lights Out (2004)

Singles from Nirvana
- 1. "You Know You're Right" Released: October 8, 2002

Nirvana is a greatest hits album by the American rock band Nirvana, released on October 29, 2002. It was the third Nirvana album released following the death of lead singer and guitarist Kurt Cobain in 1994.

The album includes songs from Nirvana's three studio albums, Bleach, Nevermind, and In Utero, and the live album MTV Unplugged in New York, along with the single, "Sliver," originally released in 1990 and later on the band's rarities compilation, Incesticide. Additionally, it includes the previously unreleased song "You Know You're Right", recorded in 1994 during Nirvana's final studio session. It also includes a version of "Been a Son" that was previously only available on a UK limited release, and the Scott Litt remix of "Pennyroyal Tea".

Nirvana opened at number three on the Billboard 200 with 234,001 copies sold. It has sold one million copies in the United States, and two million copies in Europe as of 2007.

== Background ==
Nirvana was released following the settlement of a long-standing legal dispute between Cobain's widow, Courtney Love, and surviving Nirvana members Krist Novoselic and Dave Grohl.

The dispute was largely centered around "You Know You're Right", which Novoselic and Grohl had wanted to release on a long-delayed Nirvana rarities box set. However, Love blocked the song's release, and sued Novoselic and Grohl over control of Nirvana's legacy. Love's lawsuit maintained that "You Know You're Right" was a "potential 'hit' of extraordinary artistic and commercial value." She believed the song would be "wasted" on a box set, and instead belonged on a single-disc compilation similar to the Beatles' 1.

In September 2002, it was officially announced that the lawsuit had been settled, and that "You Know You're Right" would be released on Nirvana, a greatest hits compilation or "one-CD history of the band," in November, with the box set to follow in 2004. However, the release of the greatest hits set was pushed forward to October 29, 2002.

== Release ==
The first song on the album's otherwise chronological track listing is "You Know You're Right", which was also released as a downloadable single. It is followed by "About a Girl", the only inclusion from Nirvana's 1989 debut album, Bleach. The album's producer, Jack Endino, originally saw the song as a potential single, and a live version, from Nirvana's 1993 MTV Unplugged performance, was released as a commercial single to promote the band's 1994 album MTV Unplugged in New York. "Been a Son" was previously only available on Nirvana's 1989 Blew EP, a limited UK release. The fourth song on the compilation is "Sliver", which was released as a non-album single in 1990, the band's final release on Sub Pop (the same version appears on the Incesticide compilation, released in 1992).

The next four songs, "Smells Like Teen Spirit", "Come as You Are", "Lithium" and "In Bloom", are the commercially released singles from the band's second album and major label debut, Nevermind, released in 1991. These are followed by "Heart-Shaped Box", "Pennyroyal Tea" and "Rape Me", three singles from the band's third and final studio album, In Utero, released in 1993. The version of "Pennyroyal Tea" included is the remix by Scott Litt, which was prepared for the song's single, but the single was recalled after Cobain's death in April 1994. Prior to the release of Nirvana, this remix was only commercially available on the censored Wal-Mart and Kmart versions of In Utero, released in March 1994. The final studio track is the In Utero song "Dumb", which was never released as a single, but has become a popular song on alternative rock radio stations.

The Northern American version of the album closes with two songs from MTV Unplugged in New York, "All Apologies" and "The Man Who Sold the World", both of which were released as promotional singles from the album (the studio version of "All Apologies", which appears on In Utero, was released as that album's second single in 1993, as a double A-side with "Rape Me"). All non-US and Canadian versions of the album end with "Where Did You Sleep Last Night", another song from MTV Unplugged in New York, from which it was also released as a promotional single. The Japanese version includes the Unplugged version of "Something in the Way", which was released as a B-side to the "About a Girl" single in 1994, as the second-to-last track.

The album contains liner notes by music journalist David Fricke of Rolling Stone magazine.

One month after the album was released, Cobain's published Journals were released. The book debuted at No. 1 on the New York Times bestseller list (non-fiction), and its publishers stated that the simultaneous release of the Nirvana hits set helped fire cross-promotion at retail and that the album release was providence.

=== Vinyl versions ===
The original vinyl release of Nirvana, in 2002, was a rare 16-track European double LP that included the MTV Unplugged versions of "Something in the Way" and "Where Did You Sleep Last Night" as the final two tracks, similar to the Japanese CD version.

In 2015, the Northern American 14-track edition was released on vinyl for the first time, world-wide, as a double LP on 200-gram vinyl, packaged with a digital download card for 96 kHz 24-bit HD Audio, and as a single LP on 150-gram vinyl, with a download card for the album on 320 kbit MP4 audio. It was also released as a Blu-ray Pure Audio in high resolution 96 kHz 24-bit, available in three stereo audio formats: PCM, DTS-HD Master Audio and Dolby TrueHD stereo.

== Critical reception ==
Professional ratings
Review scores
Source	Rating
AllMusic	2.5/5 stars
Drowned in Sound	10/10
The Encyclopedia of Popular Music	4/5 stars
Entertainment Weekly	A
NME	9/10
Pitchfork	7.0/10
Punknews	2/5 stars
Rolling Stone	4/5 stars
The Rolling Stone Album Guide	3/5 stars
Spin	10/10

Several critics believed that Nirvana was too brief, and omitted key tracks. Stephen Thomas Erlewine of AllMusic wrote that "the presence of a few more tracks, along with placing 'You Know You're Right' at the end where it belongs, would have made this collection not just stronger, but possibly definitive. As it stands, it feels like a bit of a cheap compromise and a wasted opportunity." Will Bryant of Pitchfork called the album "an artful selection of the band's most seminal material", but also dismissed it as "a party mix for parents who want to appreciate Cobain's Lennon-esque knack for great melodies without having to click past 'Scentless Apprentice' or 'Territorial Pissings'...utterly inoffensive: an impulse buy from Columbia House, perhaps, with no more artistic value than the Eagles' Greatest Hits or the Beatles' 1."

In 2019, the NME ranked Nirvana at number 24 on their 28 Best Greatest Hits albums list.

== Track listing ==
All tracks are written by Kurt Cobain except where noted.

No.	Title	Writer(s)	Album	Length
1.	"You Know You're Right"		Previously unreleased	3:38
2.	"About a Girl"		Bleach (1989)	2:49
3.	"Been a Son"		Blew (1989)	2:23
4.	"Sliver"	Cobain; Krist Novoselic	non-album single (1990)	2:14
5.	"Smells Like Teen Spirit"	Cobain; Dave Grohl; Novoselic	Nevermind (1991)	5:01
6.	"Come as You Are"		Nevermind	3:39
7.	"Lithium"		Nevermind	4:17
8.	"In Bloom"		Nevermind	4:15
9.	"Heart-Shaped Box"		In Utero (1993)	4:41
10.	"Pennyroyal Tea" (Scott Litt remix)		In Utero (censored version; 1994)	3:38
11.	"Rape Me"		In Utero	2:51
12.	"Dumb"		In Utero	2:34
13.	"All Apologies"		MTV Unplugged in New York (1994)	3:51
14.	"The Man Who Sold the World"	David Bowie	MTV Unplugged in New York	3:47

International CD (released outside of the US, Canada, and Japan) bonus track
No.	Title	Writer(s)	Album	Length
15.	"Where Did You Sleep Last Night"	Traditional	MTV Unplugged in New York	5:08

European 2002 vinyl and Japanese CD bonus tracks
No.	Title	Album	Length
15.	"Something in the Way"	MTV Unplugged in New York	4:01
16.	"Where Did You Sleep Last Night"	MTV Unplugged in New York	5:08

== Personnel ==
Musicians

- Kurt Cobain – vocals, guitar
- Krist Novoselic – bass
- Dave Grohl – drums (except on tracks 2–4), backing vocals on "In Bloom" and MTV Unplugged tracks
- Chad Channing – drums on "About a Girl" and "Been a Son"
- Dan Peters – drums on "Sliver"
- Pat Smear – guitar on MTV Unplugged tracks
- Lori Goldston – cello on MTV Unplugged tracks
- Kera Schaley – cello on "Dumb"

Production

- Nirvana – production
- Butch Vig – production, engineering
- Steve Albini – engineering, mixing
- Jack Endino – engineering, mixing
- Steve Fisk – engineering, mixing
- Adam Kasper – engineering, mixing
- Andy Wallace – mixing
- Scott Litt – production, mixing
- Bob Ludwig – mastering
- Robert Fisher – art direction
- David Fricke – liner notes
- Michael Meisel – project director
- James Barber – project director
- John Silva – project director
- Corbis Bettman – photography
- Frank Micelotta – photography
- Frank Ockenfels – photography
- Charles Peterson – photography
- Redferns – photography

== Charts ==
=== Weekly charts ===
Weekly chart performance for the original release of Nirvana's self-titled compilation album
Chart (2002)	Peak position
Australian Albums (ARIA)	1
Austrian Albums (Ö3 Austria)	1
Belgian Albums (Ultratop Flanders)	2
Belgian Albums (Ultratop Wallonia)	4
Canadian Albums (Billboard)	2
Danish Albums (Hitlisten)	6
Dutch Albums (Album Top 100)	12
European Top 100 Albums (Music & Media)	2
Finnish Albums (Suomen virallinen lista)	9
French Albums (SNEP)	2
German Albums (GFK)	5
Greek Albums (IFPI Greece)	4
Irish Albums (IFPI Ireland)	2
Italian Albums (FIMI)	6
Japanese Albums (Oricon)	6
New Zealand Albums (RMNZ)	2
Norwegian Albums (VG-lista)	5
Portuguese Albums (AFP)	3
Scottish Albums (OCC)	3
Spanish Albums (Promusicae)	28
Swedish Albums (Sverigetopplistan)	10
Swiss Albums (Schweizer Hitparade)	2
UK Albums (OCC)	3
UK Rock & Metal Albums (OCC)	1
US Billboard 200	3

Weekly chart performance for the 2015 re-release of Nirvana's self-titled compilation album
Chart (2015)	Peak position
US Top Catalog Albums (Billboard)	18
US Vinyl Albums (Billboard)	16

Chart (2017)	Peak position
US Top Hard Rock Albums (Billboard)	15

Chart (2022)	Peak position
Polish Albums (ZPAV)	4

Chart (2024)	Peak position
Greek Albums (Billboard)	1
Irish Albums (OCC)	27

Weekly chart performance for the 2020 Walmart exclusive smoke colored vinyl release
Chart (2020)	Peak position
US Vinyl Albums (Billboard)	5

=== Year-end charts ===
Year-end chart performance for Nirvana's self-titled compilation album
Chart (2002)	Position
Australian Albums (ARIA)	60
Austrian Albums (Ö3 Austria)	37
Belgian Albums (Ultratop Flanders)	42
Belgian Alternative Albums (Ultratop Flanders)	23
Belgian Albums (Ultratop Wallonia)	51
Canadian Albums (Nielsen SoundScan)	54
Canadian Alternative Albums (Nielsen SoundScan)	15
Canadian Metal Albums (Nielsen SoundScan)	8
Danish Albums (Hitlisten)	92
European Albums (Music & Media)	84
Finnish Albums (Suomen viralinen lista)	20
German Albums (Offizielle Top 100)	88
Irish Albums (IRMA)	17
Italian Albums (Musica e dischi)	80
Swedish Albums (Sverigetopplistan)	83
Swiss Albums (Schweizer Hitparade)	40
UK Albums (OCC)	34
US Billboard 200	183
Worldwide Albums (IFPI)	22

Chart (2003)	Position
Australian Albums (ARIA)	70
Australian Heavy Rock & Metal Albums (ARIA)	9
Austrian Albums (Ö3 Austria)	53
Belgian Alternative Albums (Ultratop Flanders)	50
French Albums (SNEP)	166
German Albums (Offizielle Top 100)	96
UK Albums (OCC)	150
US Billboard 200	88

Chart (2004)	Position
French Albums (SNEP)	195

Chart (2018)	Position
Australian Vinyl Albums (ARIA)	45

Chart (2019)	Position
Australian Vinyl Albums (ARIA)	58

Chart (2020)	Position
Australian Vinyl Albums (ARIA)	23

Chart (2021)	Position
Australian Vinyl Albums (ARIA)	44

Chart (2022)	Position
Polish Albums (ZPAV)	77
UK Albums (OCC)	100

Chart (2023)	Position
UK Albums (OCC)	85
US Top Rock Albums (Billboard)	38

Chart (2024)	Position
UK Albums (OCC)	67

Chart (2025)	Position
UK Albums (OCC)	83

== Certifications ==
Region	Certification	Certified units/sales
Argentina (CAPIF)	Gold	20,000^{^}
Australia (ARIA)	6× Platinum	420,000^{‡}
Austria (IFPI Austria)	Platinum	30,000^{*}
Belgium (BRMA)	Platinum	50,000^{*}
Brazil (Pro-Música Brasil)	Platinum	125,000^{*}
Finland (Musiikkituottajat)	Gold	17,128
France (SNEP)	Gold	100,000^{*}
Germany (BVMI)	3× Gold	450,000^{‡}
Italy (FIMI) sales since 2009	Platinum	50,000^{*}
Japan (RIAJ)	Platinum	200,000^{^}
Mexico (AMPROFON)	Gold	75,000^{^}
New Zealand (RMNZ)	3× Platinum	45,000^{^}
Norway (IFPI Norway)	Platinum	40,000^{*}
Poland (ZPAV)	Platinum	20,000^{‡}
Spain (Promusicae)	Gold	50,000^{^}
Sweden (GLF)	Gold	30,000^{^}
Switzerland (IFPI Switzerland)	Platinum	40,000^{^}
United Kingdom (BPI)	5× Platinum	1,500,000^{‡}
United States (RIAA)	Platinum	2,000,000
Summaries
Europe (IFPI)	2× Platinum	2,000,000^{*}
^{*} Sales figures based on certification alone.^{^} Shipments figures based on certification alone.^{‡} Sales+streaming figures based on certification alone.
