= I Hate Myself and Want to Die =

1993 song by Nirvana

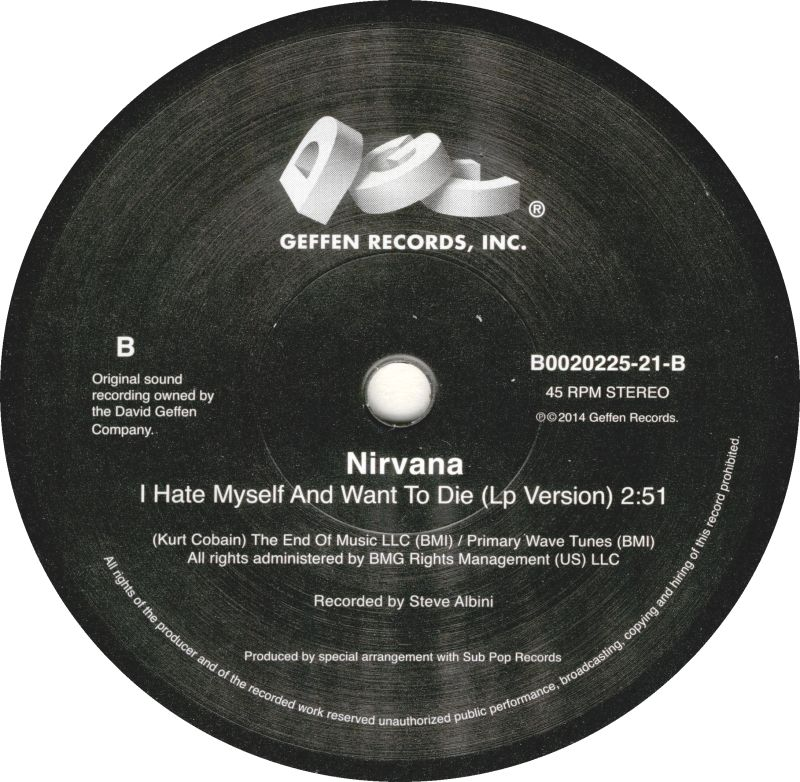
- B-side of 2014 Record Store Day re-release of the "Pennyroyal Tea" single

Song by Nirvana

from the album The Beavis and Butt-Head Experience
- A-side: "Pennyroyal Tea"
- Released: November 23, 1993
- Recorded: February 1993
- Studio: Pachyderm, Cannon Falls, Minnesota
- Genre: Grunge, noise rock
- Length: 2:42
- Label: Geffen
- Songwriter: Kurt Cobain
- Producer: Steve Albini

"I Hate Myself and Want to Die" is a song by the American rock band Nirvana, written by vocalist and guitarist Kurt Cobain. It was first released in November 1993 as the first track on The Beavis and Butt-Head Experience compilation album which peaked at number 5 on the Billboard 200.

The song was also sanctioned to be released as a B-side to the band's "Pennyroyal Tea" single, but the single's original release was cancelled after Cobain's death in April 1994.

== Early history ==
"I Hate Myself and Want to Die" was never performed live, and survives in only two known versions, both recorded in the studio. The first is a demo, featuring unfinished lyrics, recorded in January 1993 by Craig Montgomery at BMG Ariola Ltda in Rio de Janeiro, Brazil. This version was released on the Nirvana rarities box set, With the Lights Out, in November 2004.

== In Utero ==
The second and final studio version of "I Hate Myself and Want to Die" was recorded by Steve Albini at Pachyderm Studios on February 15, 1993, during the recording session for the band's third and final album, In Utero. Originally titled "2 Bass Kid", the song was represented by a fish symbol on the tape box for the album.

It missed inclusion on In Utero, which was released in September 1993, with Cobain later explaining that there were too many "noise" songs on the album. The song instead appeared as the opening track on the compilation album The Beavis and Butt-Head Experience, released in November 1993. It featured an introduction by Mike Judge, voicing the titular characters, as well as commentary at the end, with the characters declaring that the song "kicked ass" and "ruled". The band was given $60,000 by their record label, Geffen Records, for the song. The Beavis and Butt-Head Experience compilation album peaked at number 5 on the Billboard 200 album chart, and has since been certified 2× Platinum in the US.

I Hate Myself and Want to Die was also a working title for In Utero. According to Tom Mallon of Rolling Stone, Cobain abandoned the title due to fear that the dark humor of the title would be lost on some critics and fans, and after being convinced by Nirvana bassist Krist Novoselic that the band might end up with lawsuits if Cobain stuck with the original title. Cobain changed the album's title to Verse Chorus Verse, and then two weeks later to its final title of In Utero. In an October 1993 interview with David Fricke of Rolling Stone, Cobain explained that he meant the title "as literally as a joke can be", calling it "funny" and claiming it was a reference to the public perception of him "as this pissy, complaining, freaked–out schizophrenic who wants to kill himself all the time."

The liner notes to With the Lights Out incorrectly state that the version included in the set, the demo recorded in January 1993 in Rio de Janeiro, was the version released on The Beavis and Butt-Head Experience.

=== "Pennyroyal Tea" single ===
The Albini-recorded version of "I Hate Myself and Want to Die" was also set to be released as a B-side to the "Pennyroyal Tea" single in April 1994, but the single was recalled following Cobain's death that month, plausibly because of the song's title.

However, before its planned release in North America and its early May 1994 release in the United Kingdom, the single was already released in Germany. At the time, only retail versions of the CD single made in Germany had been manufactured and distributed. The singles were recalled and destroyed by the record label or retailers, but some copies were put aside, which is apparently the source of surviving copies. Some copies may have been sold by retailers, despite the recall. The single was re-released for Record Store Day in 2014.

== Composition and lyrics ==
Despite the song's title, the lyrics of "I Hate Myself and Want to Die" contain no obvious reference to suicide, although some indirect references are present. In The Rough Guide to Nirvana, Gillian G. Gaar called it an "upbeat, friendly thrash-along" with "nonsense lyrics" whose title lacked a connection with its music.

The song's interlude features Cobain quoting a "Deep Thought" by American comedian Jack Handey.

== Reception ==
In Take a Walk on the Dark Side: Rock and Roll Myths, Legends, and Curses, R. Gary Patterson compared the song to John Lennon's "Yer Blues" as "an attempt to explain [Cobain's] introspection". In 2015, Rolling Stone put the song at number 44 on a ranked list of 102 Nirvana songs, calling it "a lurching piece of infectious sludge-pop."

Cobain himself was dismissive of the song, calling it "boring" and saying that the band "could write that song in our sleep". Craig Montgomery, however, who recorded the demo version at BMG Ariola Ltda in Rio de Janeiro, Brazil, was impressed with the song, praising its riff and rhythm and saying he thought it could have been a hit.

English musician Noel Gallagher, vocalist and guitarist of the rock band Oasis, mentioned the song while discussing the inspiration behind the 1994 Oasis single "Live Forever", which was conceived as an indirect response to the perceived pessimism of the grunge movement of the early 1990s. "I remember Nirvana had a tune called 'I Hate Myself and Want to Die'," Gallagher said, "and I was like 'Well, I'm not fucking having that.' As much as I fucking like [Cobain] and all that shit, I'm not having that... Kids don't need to be hearing that nonsense. Seems to me that there was a guy who had everything, and was miserable about it."

The song is referenced by American indie rock musician Cat Power in the song "Hate" on her 2006 album, The Greatest.

== Covers ==
The Blackout released a parody of the song, titled "I Love Myself and I Wanna Live", in 2009. Baton Rouge sludge metal band Thou released a cover of the song on their 2014 EP The Sacrifice.

== Other releases ==
- A remix of the In Utero version, done by Albini in 2013, appeared on the 20th anniversary "Deluxe" and "Super Deluxe" versions of In Utero, released in September 2013. The original mix, as featured on The Beavis and Butt-Head Experience and the "Pennyroyal Tea" single, would later appear on the 30th anniversary "Deluxe" and "Super Deluxe" versions of In Utero, released in 2023.

== Personnel ==
Nirvana

- Kurt Cobain – vocals, guitar, backing vocals
- Krist Novoselic – bass
- Dave Grohl – drums

Production personnel

- Steve Albini – producer, engineer
- Adam Kasper – engineer
- Bob Ludwig – mastering

== Bibliography ==
Cross, Charles R. (2002). Heavier Than Heaven: The Biography of Kurt Cobain. Sceptre. ISBN 978-1-444-71389-3.
