= Church of Kurt Cobain =

Christian Church in Portland, Oregon, US

The Church of Kurt Cobain was an American Christian church founded in 1996 in Portland, Oregon, and whose patron was Kurt Cobain, the lead singer and guitarist of American rock band Nirvana, who committed suicide in April 1994.

== History ==
The church was founded by Jim Dillon, in Portland, Oregon. Dillon stated that he got the idea for the church from a similar church in San Francisco that paid tribute to jazz musician John Coltrane and that his church aimed to find meaning in the life of Kurt Cobain who committed suicide in 1994. He also stated that Cobain's music has a deeper spiritual message. Instead of playing "Amazing Grace" on an organ, the church would play the Nirvana song "Smells Like Teen Spirit". Dillon also stated of another Nirvana song, "Rape Me", that "In essence, the real message is one of a Christian theme - treat me the way you want me to treat you".

The church held a rally on May 28, 1996, to inaugurate their place of worship and the founders claimed that their purpose was to pay homage to Cobain who they referred to as a "Saint" and also to the Generation X who they felt had been ignored by the Baby boomer focused-world.

A September 1996 article by Spin stated that the Kurt Cobain Church had been a media hoax. In a July 2021 article by Alan Cross in A Journal of Musical Things, he claimed that the Church of Kurt Cobain while having Dillon as its reverend and having a big recruitment drive in 1996, was in fact a stunt created by an art director named Jerry Ketel and that the purpose of it was to make a statement against celebrity culture and society's fascination with drug abuse and suicide. Cross believed that Ketel had fooled some big media outlets into thinking that it was real.
