= Scentless Apprentice =

Song by Nirvana

from the album In Utero
- Released: September 21, 1993
- Recorded: February 12–26, 1993
- Studio: Pachyderm (Cannon Falls, Minnesota)
- Length: 3:48
- Label: DGC
- Songwriters: Kurt Cobain; Dave Grohl; Krist Novoselic
- Producer: Steve Albini

In Utero track listing
- 12 tracks: 1. "Serve the Servants"; 2. "Scentless Apprentice"; 3. "Heart-Shaped Box"; 4. "Rape Me"; 5. "Frances Farmer Will Have Her Revenge on Seattle"; 6. "Dumb"; 7. "Very Ape"; 8. "Milk It"; 9. "Pennyroyal Tea"; 10. "Radio Friendly Unit Shifter"; 11. "tourette's" 12. "All Apologies"

"Scentless Apprentice" is a song by the American rock band Nirvana, written by vocalist and guitarist Kurt Cobain, drummer Dave Grohl, and bassist Krist Novoselic. It is the second track on their third and final studio album In Utero, released in September 1993.

Based on the novel Perfume by Patrick Süskind, "Scentless Apprentice" is unique among Nirvana songs in that the main guitar riff was written by Grohl, rather than Cobain. The band briefly considered releasing it as the album's second single, following "Heart-Shaped Box," but no single for the song was released by the time of Cobain's suicide in April 1994.

== Early history ==
"Scentless Apprentice" was written during a band rehearsal in 1992. Unlike most Nirvana songs, the guitar riff was written by Grohl, rather than Cobain. "It was such a cliché grunge Tad riff that I was reluctant to even jam on it," Cobain told Michael Azerrad, in the 1993 Nirvana biography, Come As You Are: The Story of Nirvana. "But I decided to write a song with that just to make [Grohl] feel better, to tell you the truth, and it turned out really cool." Cobain added the ascending guitar riff played over the main riff and arranged the song, while Novoselic helped compose the song's second section. "I think most of the reason that song sounds good is because of the singing style and the guitar parts I do over the top of the basic rhythm," Cobain told Azerrad, "But hell, that was great." It is the only song on In Utero on which all three band members received songwriting credits.

The earliest known recording is an instrumental studio jam, recorded without Cobain on October 6, 1992, featuring former Scratch Acid drummer Rey Washam on drums, along with Grohl on guitar and Novoselic on bass. The first recording featuring Cobain is a boombox-recorded rehearsal demo, over nine minutes long, that was later released on the posthumous Nirvana box set With the Lights Out (2004). According to its booklet, it was recorded sometime in the winter of 1992.

"Scentless Apprentice" was first recorded in the studio by Craig Montgomery at BMG-Ariola studios in Rio de Janeiro, Brazil in January 1993. This demo version was closer in duration and structure to the finished version of the song, although it featured unfinished lyrics. The song was debuted live shortly before this version was recorded, on January 16, 1993 at the Hollywood Rock Festival in São Paulo, Brazil, and performed again shortly after, on January 23, 1993 at the Hollywood Rock Festival in Rio de Janeiro. Although the song's structure had been trimmed by that point, as evidenced by the studio version, the latter of these performances still developed into an extended jam that lasted nearly 20 minutes. During this performance, Cobain spat into the lenses of the TV cameras filming the show, and also exposed himself to one of the cameras, in a sequence that he referred to as "the penis and flower petal face in camera performance piece" in the posthumously released Journals. Footage of this part of the performance appears in the 1994 home video, Live! Tonight! Sold Out!!.

== In Utero ==
The final studio version of "Scentless Apprentice" was recorded by Steve Albini in February 1993, at Pachyderm Studios in Cannon Falls, Minnesota. This version was released on the band's third and final studio album, In Utero, in September 1993.

The song was recorded on February 13, the first day of the In Utero sessions, under the working title "Chuck Chuck Fo Fuck", a reference to the rhythm of the guitar riff. According to Albini, Cobain recorded two vocal takes for the song: one main vocal take, and a second "where Kurt was just singing parts of the song to emphasize them or parts of the song with a different sound quality."

== Post–In Utero ==
The final live performance of "Scentless Apprentice" was at Nirvana's second-to-last show, at Hala Tivoli in Ljubljana, Slovenia on February 27, 1994.

== Composition ==
=== Music ===
"Scentless Apprentice" runs for a duration of three minutes and forty-eight seconds. According to the sheet music published at Musicnotes.com by BMG Rights Management, it is written in the time signature of common time, with a moderately fast rock tempo of 111 beats per minute. "Scentless Apprentice" is composed in the key of F Minor, while Cobain's vocal range spans one octave and four notes, from a low of B♭_{3} to a high of F_{4}. The song has a basic sequence of F_{5}–E♭_{5}/C–F_{5}–E♭_{5}/C–F_{5}–E♭_{5}/C–F_{5} in the verses and F♯_{6}–F♯_{7}–F♯_{maj7}–F♯ during the refrain as its chord progression.

=== Lyrics ===
The song's lyrics are based on the 1985 novel Perfume by German writer Patrick Süskind, one of Cobain's favorite books. The novel is set in France in the eighteenth century and tells the story of an orphan who is born with two notable characteristics – he has an extraordinary sense of smell, but he himself gives off no body odor of any kind. He is reluctantly cared for at an orphanage by nurses who think he is devil-spawned. Eventually, he becomes an apprentice to a master perfume-maker, and later commits a series of murders in order to make perfumes from the scents of his victims.

In a 1993 interview, Cobain said: "I've read Perfume by Patrick Süskind about ten times in my life, and I can't stop reading it. It's like something that's just stationary in my pocket all the time, it just doesn't leave me. And every time I'm bored, like when I'm on an airplane or something, I read it over and over again." Cobain had not originally intended to turn his reading of the book into lyrics. But as the song's music turned out quite fierce, the need arose for some strong lyrics to match, prompting Cobain to base them on the grim story of Perfume.

== Release and reception ==
Cobain was pleased with the recording, telling Spin in a 1993 interview that the band wanted to release the song as the album's second single, following "Heart-Shaped Box." Ultimately, no single was ever released for the song before Cobain's death in April 1994, with "All Apologies" and "Rape Me" released as double A-sides as the album's second single instead. However, the song did receive some airplay on US album-oriented rock radio in 1993.

Albini was also impressed with the song, citing it and the In Utero track "Milk It" as "the two that struck me as the biggest step for the band," because they represented "the biggest break" from the band's more traditionally melodic material, and "the most adventurous sonically" songs on the album.

=== Legacy ===
In 2008, "Scentless Apprentice" was included in The Pitchfork 500, a book published by the online music publication Pitchfork featuring their list of the "greatest songs" from 1977 to 2006.

In 2015, Rolling Stone ranked "Scentless Apprentice" at number 24 in their list of the top 102 Nirvana songs. In a reader's poll of Nirvana songs conducted by Louder Sound in May 2018, "Scentless Apprentice" placed 23rd. In 2019, it was ranked at number 15 on The Guardian's "Nirvana's 20 greatest songs" list. In 2023, Stephen Thomas Erlewine ranked it at number 19 on his list of Nirvana's "30 greatest songs" for the A.V. Club, calling it "a singularly powerful piece of rock and roll."

== Personnel ==
- Kurt Cobain – guitar, vocals
- Dave Grohl – drums
- Krist Novoselic – bass

== Live promotional versions ==
A live version of the song, from the band's show at the Seattle Center Arena in Seattle on January 7, 1994, was released as a streaming single in September 2023, to promote the 30th anniversary reissue of In Utero, set to be released in October 2023. The "Super Deluxe" version of the set will feature the complete concert.

== Accolades ==
Year	Publication	Country	Accolade	Rank
1998	Kerrang!	United Kingdom	20 Great Nirvana Songs Picked by the Stars	18
2004	Q	United Kingdom	10 Songs Based On Novels	9
2019	The Guardian	United Kingdom	Nirvana's 20 greatest songs - ranked!	15
2023	The A.V. Club	United States	Essential Nirvana: Their 30 greatest songs, ranked	19

== Other releases ==
- The demo recorded at BMG-Ariola in Rio de Janeiro in January 1993 was released on the 20th anniversary "Deluxe" and "Super Deluxe" versions of In Utero in September 2013.
- The In Utero version was re-released on the compilation CD Strung Out, released by Guitar World in a joint promotion with DGC in 1993. It also appeared on the promo cassette Concrete Music Bloc - Volume III, released by the heavy metal record label Concrete Corner in 1993.
- The 20th anniversary "Deluxe" and "Super Deluxe" versions of In Utero also featured a 2013 remix of the song by Albini.
- A live version, recorded at Pier 48 in Seattle on December 13, 1993, appeared on the live compilation, From the Muddy Banks of the Wishkah, in November 1996. An edited version of the show, including "Scentless Apprentice," was first aired on MTV on December 31, 1993, and the full show was released on the live video Live and Loud in September 2013
- The 30th anniversary "Super Deluxe" reissue of In Utero also included a version of "Scentless Apprentice" recorded at Palaghiaccio in Marino, Italy on February 22, 1994 as bonus material.

== Bibliography ==
- Azerrad, Michael (1994). Come As You Are: The Story of Nirvana. Doubleday. ISBN 0-385-47199-8.
- Crisafulli, Chuck (1996). Teen Spirit: The Stories Behind Every Nirvana Song. London: Omnibus Press. ISBN 0711958092.
- Gaar, Gillian G (2006). Nirvana's In Utero. United States: Bloomsbury Publishing USA. ISBN 9781441186096.
