= Pennyroyal Tea =

1993 song by Nirvana

- US/UK picture sleeve

Single by Nirvana

from the album In Utero
- B-side: "I Hate Myself and Want to Die"; "Where Did You Sleep Last Night (In the Pines)"
- Released: May 3, 1994 (cancelled); April 19, 2014 (20th anniversary re-release)
- Recorded: February 13–26, 1993
- Studio: Pachyderm (Cannon Falls, Minnesota)
- Genre: Grunge
- Length: 3:36
- Label: Geffen
- Songwriter: Kurt Cobain
- Producer: Steve Albini

Nirvana singles chronology
"All Apologies (unplugged)" (1994)	"Pennyroyal Tea" (1994)	"About a Girl" (1994)

In Utero track listing
- 12 tracks: 1. "Serve the Servants"; 2. "Scentless Apprentice"; 3. "Heart-Shaped Box"; 4. "Rape Me"; 5. "Frances Farmer Will Have Her Revenge on Seattle"; 6. "Dumb"; 7. "Very Ape"; 8. "Milk It"; 9. "Pennyroyal Tea"; 10. "Radio Friendly Unit Shifter"; 11. "tourette's" 12. "All Apologies"

"Pennyroyal Tea" is a song by the American rock band Nirvana, written by the vocalist and guitarist, Kurt Cobain. It was released on Nirvana's third and final studio album, In Utero, in September 1993.

In November 1993, the song was remixed by Scott Litt, who had remixed the songs "Heart-Shaped Box" and "All Apologies", in preparation for its release as a single. The Litt remix was included on the censored version of In Utero, released in March 1994.

The "Pennyroyal Tea" single was set for release in April 1994, but cancelled following Cobain's death that month. A few copies survived the recall, and have become among the most sought after and expensive collectables in Nirvana's catalogue. A music video was also cancelled.

The "Pennyroyal Tea" single was released on limited edition 7-inch vinyl for Record Store Day in April 2014, and reached number 1 on the Billboard Hot Singles Sales chart.

== Early history ==
According to Michael Azerrad's 1993 Nirvana biography, Come as You Are: The Story of Nirvana, "Pennyroyal Tea" was written by Cobain in 1990 in an Olympia, Washington apartment he shared with Nirvana drummer Dave Grohl. "Dave and I were screwing around on a 4-track," Cobain explained, "and I wrote that song in about thirty seconds. And I sat down for like half-an-hour and wrote the lyrics and then we recorded it."

"Pennyroyal Tea" was first performed live on April 17, 1991 at the OK Hotel in Seattle, Washington, the show at which Nirvana also debuted their breakthrough single, "Smells Like Teen Spirit". Footage of both songs from this performance was released on the DVD of the Nirvana rarities box set, With the Lights Out, in November 2004.

Two unfinished takes of the song, both lacking vocals, were recorded by Jack Endino on October 26, 1992, at Word of Mouth in Seattle, Washington.

== In Utero ==
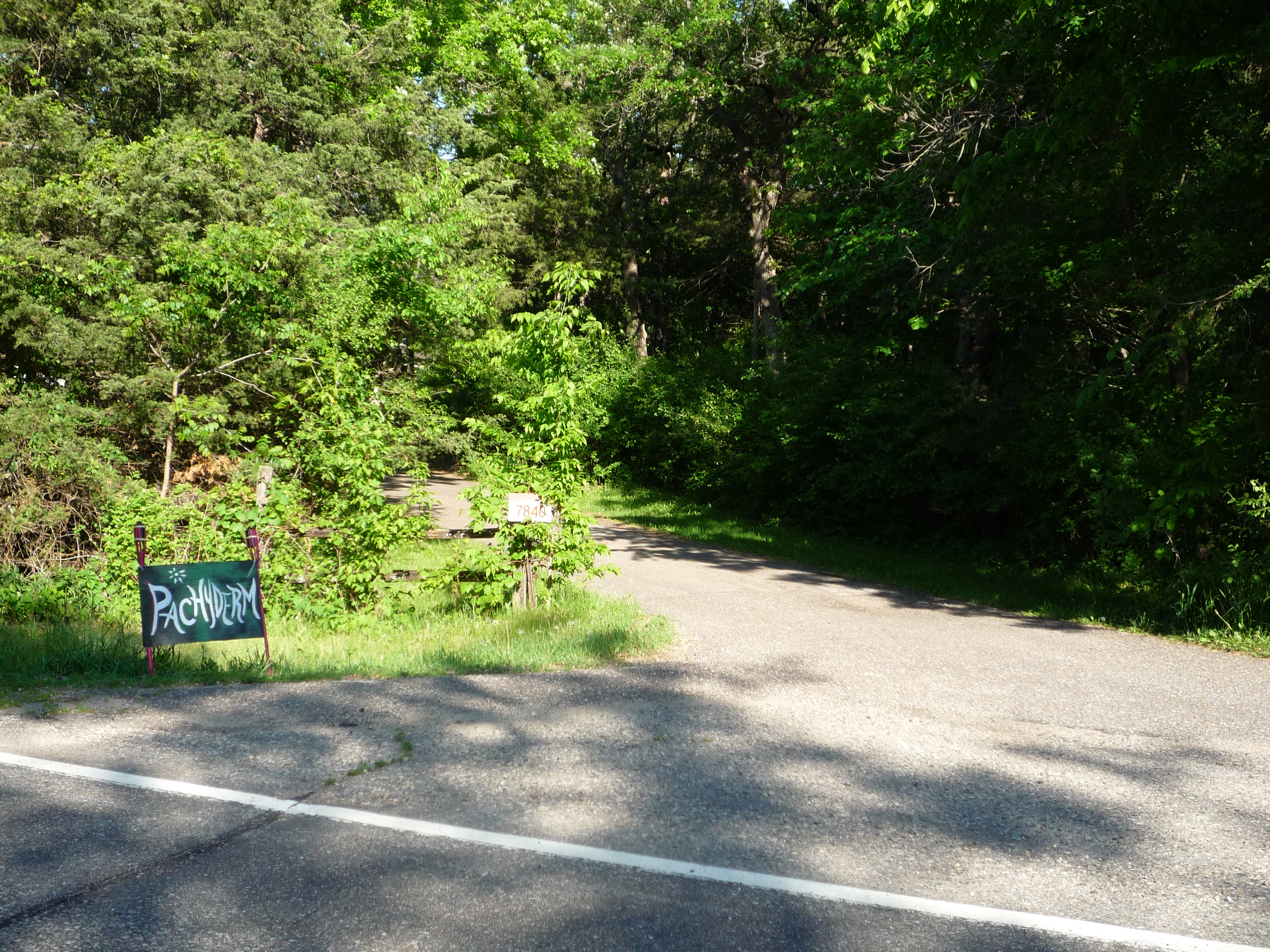
The sign and driveway for Pachyderm Studios in Cannon Falls, Minnesota, where Nirvana recorded In Utero with Steve Albini in February 1993

The final studio version of "Pennyroyal Tea" was recorded by Steve Albini at Pachyderm Studios in Cannon Falls, Minnesota, in February, 1993, and officially released on In Utero in September 1993.

The song was first attempted on February 14, with the first take being an instrumental. In a 2013 interview for the audio series Spotify Landmark, Albini revealed that "Pennyroyal Tea" and the album's eventual first single, "Heart-Shaped Box", were the only two songs recorded during the sessions that required "more than a couple of takes", saying that both were "recorded several times in several aerations." Albini also explained that Grohl's bass drum was replaced on "Pennyroyal Tea", as well as "Dumb", with a small one "with a full-front head on it, so that it had a very sort of bouncy, jazzy sound, as opposed to the sort of more percussive, more hard rock sound on the rest of the record."

=== Remix ===
Cobain was ultimately dissatisfied with the recording, telling David Fricke in a 1993 Rolling Stone interview that the song "was not recorded right. There is something wrong with that. That should have been recorded like Nevermind, because I know that's a strong song, a hit single. We're toying with the idea of re-recording it or remixing it."

The song was remixed by Scott Litt, who had remixed the singles "Heart-Shaped Box" and "All Apologies" prior to the album's release, on November 23, 1993, at Bad Animals in Seattle, Washington. This version appeared on the censored Wal-Mart and Kmart versions of In Utero, released in March 1994. It was also the mix used on the recalled "Pennyroyal Tea" single, and became widely available when it appeared on the band's first greatest hits compilation, Nirvana, in November 2002.

== Post-In Utero ==
On November 18, 1993, Cobain performed a solo, acoustic version of the song during Nirvana's MTV Unplugged appearance at Sony Music Studios in New York City.

A full band version, featuring second guitarist Pat Smear, was recorded in Paris, France on February 4, 1994, during Nirvana's appearance on the French television show, Nulle Part Ailleurs.

The band had planned to perform the song on the UK TV show Top of the Pops later in 1994, as revealed by the discovery of a Digital Audio Tape containing three instrumental mixes of the song. The show allowed musicians to mime live vocals over pre-recorded instruments, and first featured Nirvana in November 1991, when Cobain mocked the show's format by singing "Smells Like Teen Spirit" in a lower key.

"Pennyroyal Tea" was performed for the last time live at Nirvana's final concert, on March 1, 1994, at Terminal Eins in Munich, Germany.

== Composition and lyrics ==
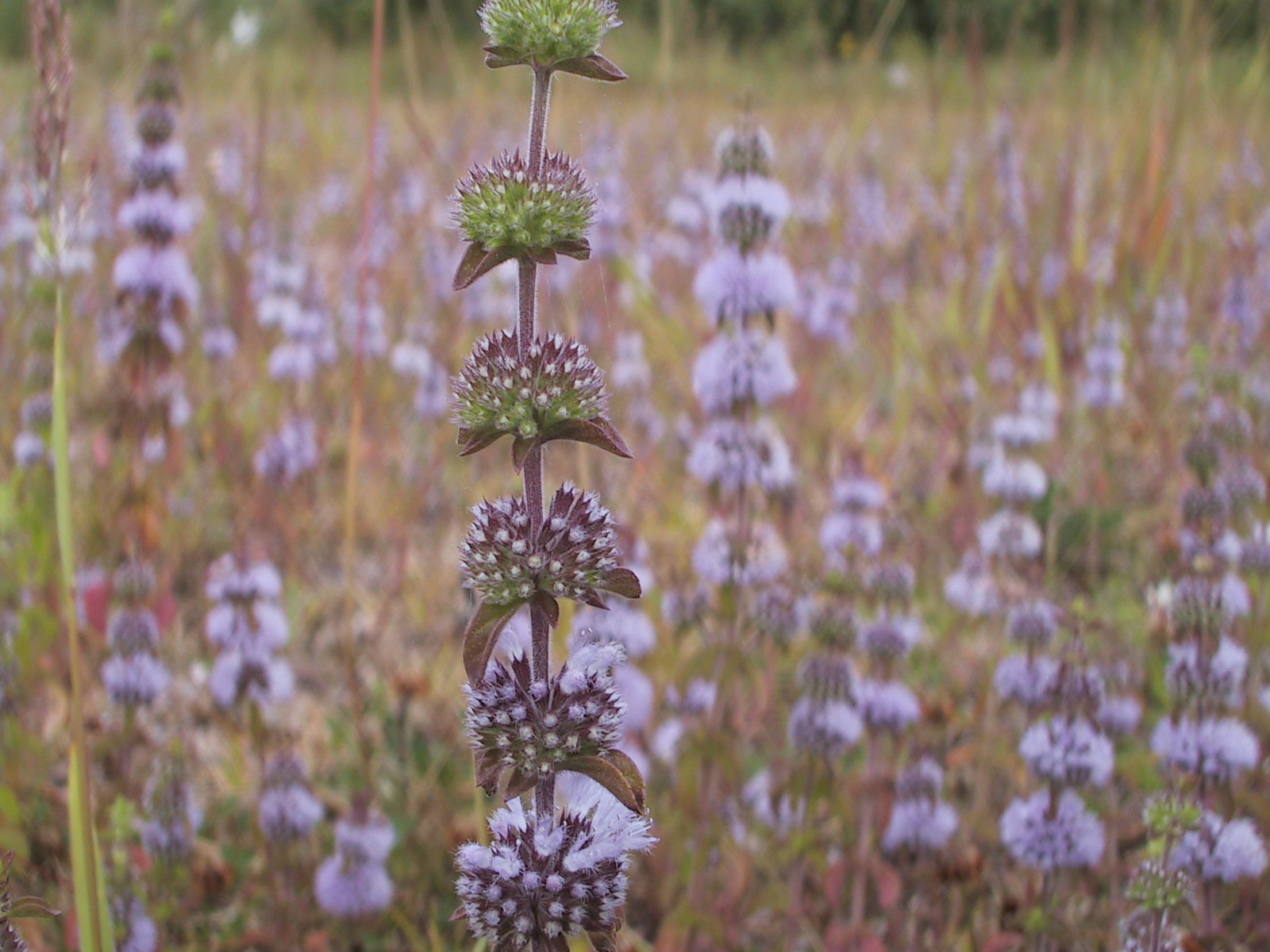
Pennyroyal growing in a grassland

The song's title refers to the tea made from boiling the leaves of the plant Mentha pulegium, or pennyroyal, which is used as an abortifacient, among other things, in traditional medicine. In Cobain's unused liner notes for In Utero, published posthumously in Journals in 2002, the entry for "Pennyroyal Tea" simply reads: "herbal abortive... it doesn't work, you hippie."

In an interview in the October 1993 issue of Impact, Cobain gave greater insight into the song, saying that it was about a person suffering from severe depression:

When I ask Cobain if "Penny Royal Tea" is about indigestion, he half-laughs. "Penny royal tea is a herbal abortive," he says. "I threw that in because I have so many friends who have tried to use that, and it never worked. The song is about a person who's beyond depressed; they're in their death bed, pretty much." Cobain's own bout with serious stomach pain was well documented last year. "Yeah, it did rub off on the song," he admits. And I couldn't help noticing the "Canadian" reference to a Leonard Cohen afterworld. "That was my therapy, when I was depressed and sick. I'd read things like Malloy Dies [sic] by Beckett, or listen to Leonard Cohen, which would actually make it worse," he laughs.

In a 1995 interview, Cohen told Addicted to Noise correspondent Peter Howell, "I'm sorry I couldn't have spoken to the young man. I see a lot of people at the Zen Centre, who have gone through drugs and found a way out that is not just Sunday school. There are always alternatives, and I might have been able to lay something on him. Or maybe not."

== Release ==
The "Pennyroyal Tea" single was recalled shortly after Cobain's death in April 1994. The single's cancellation may have been in part due to the title of one of the b-sides, "I Hate Myself and Want to Die", although it may have been cancelled regardless of this, so as not to capitalize on Cobain's death. In the United Kingdom, the single was scheduled to be released on May 3, 1994, but this was scrapped with Music Week reporting that sales of Nirvana releases had rocketed but that MCA did not want to cash-in on Cobain's death.

At the time, only retail versions of the CD single made in Germany had been manufactured and distributed. The singles were recalled and destroyed by the record label or retailers, but some copies were put aside, which is apparently the source of surviving copies. Some copies may have been sold by retailers, despite the recall.

Sleeves for the single's United Kingdom release, on 7 inch vinyl and cassette, were manufactured, but the single itself was not pressed in the UK prior to the recall. As with all Nirvana artwork, it had been produced in the United States, although there were no plans to release the single in the US. However, the song did receive some airplay on US rock and alternative radio in 1994-95.

A promotional CD single for the song was manufactured in the UK and exists in even smaller numbers than the German retail CD. It features only the title track, misspelled as "Penny Royal Tea". In 2019, it was reported that the promotional single had appeared twice on Discogs with prices of $1,120 and $1,199.

In a March 2020 Goldmine article, journalist and Nirvana expert Gillian G. Garr reported a range of $346 to $1,100 as recent prices of the single, and "upwards of $1,000" for the promotional single, with one recently on sale for $2,597.

=== Single artwork ===
Unlike the artwork for the previous In Utero singles, "Heart-Shaped Box" and "All Apologies"/ "Rape Me", the artwork for the "Pennyroyal Tea" single featured no input from Cobain. "We got it done and I don't know that Kurt was around to approve it or not," recalls designer Robert Fisher. "I think it might just have been shot to management to approve or something." The single's cover features a teacup on a table next to a used ashtray, a cream pitcher and animal crackers.

=== 2014 Record Store Day re-release ===
On April 19, 2014, the "Pennyroyal Tea" single was re-released on 7-inch vinyl for Record Store Day 2014, limited to only 6000 copies. It was the top-selling vinyl single of Record Store Day in the US, reaching number 1 on the Billboard Hot 100 Singles Sales Chart.

=== Critical reception ===
Reviewing In Utero for Rolling Stone, Fricke wrote, "In the sepulchral folk intro of 'Penny Royal Tea,' Cobain almost sounds like Michael Stipe at the beginning of R.E.M.'s 'Drive'—before the heaving, fuzz-burnt chorus comes lashing down with a vengeance." In his review of the album for the NME, John Mulvey wrote that "Pennyroyal Tea" was "a terrific song – straightforward, insidious, oddly moving," but that "the guitars don't scream enough, the chorus doesn't tower like it should, and overall it's the one real 'Call Butch Vig' moment."

=== Legacy ===
In 2004, the NME ranked "Pennyroyal Tea" at number six on their list of the "20 Greatest Nirvana Songs Ever." The same year, Q erroneously included the song on their list of "12 Album Tracks That Should Have Been Singles, But Weren't", at number two. In 2015, Rolling Stone placed it at number 11 on their ranking of 102 Nirvana songs. Stephen Thomas Erlewine ranked it at number 17 on his list of Nirvana's "30 greatest songs" for The A.V. Club in 2023.

== Live promotional versions ==
A live version of "Pennyroyal Tea," from the band's show at the Great Western Forum in Inglewood, California, on December 30, 1993, was released as a streaming single in September 2023, to promote the 30th anniversary reissue of In Utero, set to be released in October 2023. The "Super Deluxe" version of the reissue features the complete concert.

== Cancelled music video ==
Dutch director Anton Corbijn was asked to direct a music video for "Pennyroyal Tea", but he refused, saying he did not believe he could make a video better than the one he had made for "Heart-Shaped Box", the first single from In Utero. American director Jeffery Plansker was enlisted as the director instead, but the planned video was abandoned after Cobain's death in April 1994.

== MTV Unplugged version ==
Featuring only Cobain on vocals and guitar, the MTV Unplugged version of "Pennyroyal Tea" was the only solo performance of the concert. The band had tried different approaches to the song during the rehearsal earlier that day, performing it in a different key and with Smear on backing vocals and Grohl on guitar. However, during the show Cobain decided to attempt it on his own, asking, "Am I going to do this by myself?" to which Grohl replied, "Do it by yourself" Cobain joked that "if it sounds bad, these people are just going to have to wait." The song was performed in the same arrangement as the In Utero version but without the guitar solo, and Cobain paused before the third verse, then completed the song. Cobain biographer Charles Cross called this version Cobain's "single greatest moment onstage", writing that "like all the high-water marks of his career, it came at a time when he seemed destined to fail."

This version was officially released on the album MTV Unplugged in New York in November 1994. Footage of the performance, as well as from the rehearsals, were released on the MTV Unplugged in New York DVD in November, 2007.

== Accolades ==
Year	Publication	Country	Accolade	Rank
2004	NME	United Kingdom	Top 20 Nirvana Songs	8
2004	Q	United Kingdom	12 Album Tracks That Should Have Been Singles, But Weren't	2
2007	KROQ-FM	United States	Top 500 Songs of the '90s	461
2023	The A.V. Club	United States	Essential Nirvana: Their 30 greatest songs, ranked	16

== Track listings ==
All songs written and composed by Kurt Cobain unless otherwise noted.

1994 German CD single (GED 21907)

1. "Pennyroyal Tea" (Litt remix)
2. "I Hate Myself and Want to Die"
3. "Where Did You Sleep Last Night (In the Pines)" (live) (Traditional) (Edit)

1994 UK promotional CD single (NIRPRO)

1. "Pennyroyal Tea" (Litt remix)

1994 UK CD single (planned but never produced apart from the inserts)

1. "Pennyroyal Tea" (Litt remix)
2. "I Hate Myself and Want to Die"
3. "Where Did You Sleep Last Night (In the Pines)" (live) (Traditional)

1994 UK cassette single (planned but never produced)

1. "Pennyroyal Tea" (Litt remix)
2. "Where Did You Sleep Last Night (In the Pines)" (live) (Traditional)

1994 UK 7" vinyl single (planned but never produced apart from the card sleeves)

1. "Pennyroyal Tea" (Litt remix)
2. "Where Did You Sleep Last Night (In the Pines)" (live) (Traditional)

2014 Record Store Day 7" vinyl single re-release

1. "Pennyroyal Tea" (Litt remix)
2. "I Hate Myself and Want to Die"

== Chart positions ==
Chart (2014)	Peak position
UK Physical Singles Sales (OCC)	4
UK Rock & Metal (Official Charts)	26
UK Singles (OCC)	121
US Hot Singles Sales (Billboard)	1

== Certifications ==
Region	Certification	Certified units/sales
Australia (ARIA)	Gold	35,000^{‡}
^{‡} Sales+streaming figures based on certification alone.

== Personnel ==
All personnel credits adapted from In Utero's liner notes except design personnel adapted from "Pennyroyal Tea"'s liner notes.

Nirvana

- Kurt Cobain – vocals, guitar
- Krist Novoselic – bass
- Dave Grohl – drums

Production personnel

- Steve Albini – producer, engineer
- Adam Kasper – engineer
- Scott Litt – mixing
- Bob Ludwig – mastering

Design personnel

- Robert Fisher – art direction, design
- Greg Stata – art direction, design
- John Skalicky – photography

== Other releases ==
- The second of the two instrumental takes recorded at Word of Mouth in Seattle, on October 26, 1992, was released on the 20th anniversary "Deluxe" and "Super Deluxe" versions of In Utero in September 2013.
- A third mix of the studio version, done by Albini in 2013, also appeared the 20th anniversary "Deluxe" and "Super Deluxe" versions of In Utero.
- A live version, recorded at Pier 48 in Seattle, on December 13, 1993, for MTV, was released on the live video, Live and Loud, in September 2013. An edited version of the concert, including "Pennyroyal Tea", first aired on MTV on December 31, 1993. The Live and Loud DVD also featured rehearsal footage of the song for the show, recorded earlier that day at the same venue, as bonus material.
- The live version recorded during the band's appearance on Nulle Part Ailleurs in Paris, on February 4, 1994, appeared as bonus material on the Live and Loud DVD.
- In addition to the Great Western Forum concert, the "Super Deluxe" reissue of In Utero features the band's complete show at the Seattle Center Arena in Seattle on January 7, 1994, which also featured a version of "Pennyroyal Tea".

=== Unreleased versions ===
- The 4-track version recorded by Cobain and Grohl in Olympia in 1990 was leaked on the internet in 2015, but has never appeared on an official release. Michelle Geslani of Consequence of Sound described this recording as "darker [and] more slow-burning" than the final studio version, and wrote that it "features Cobain adapting a guttural growl not unlike Leonard Cohen (interesting, given the lyrics)."
