= Rape Me =

1993 song by Nirvana

Single by Nirvana

from the album In Utero
- A-side: "All Apologies" (double A-side)
- B-side: "Moist Vagina"
- Released: December 6, 1993
- Recorded: February 1993
- Studio: Pachyderm (Cannon Falls, Minnesota)
- Genre: Grunge
- Length: 2:49
- Label: DGC
- Songwriter: Kurt Cobain
- Producer: Steve Albini

Nirvana singles chronology
"Heart-Shaped Box" (1993)	"All Apologies" / "Rape Me" (1993)	"All Apologies (unplugged)" (1994)

In Utero track listing
- 12 tracks: 1. "Serve the Servants"; 2. "Scentless Apprentice"; 3. "Heart-Shaped Box"; 4. "Rape Me"; 5. "Frances Farmer Will Have Her Revenge on Seattle"; 6. "Dumb"; 7. "Very Ape"; 8. "Milk It"; 9. "Pennyroyal Tea"; 10. "Radio Friendly Unit Shifter"; 11. "tourette's" 12. "All Apologies"

German CD single
- The German CD single came with this large covering sticker on the box

"Rape Me" is a song by the American rock band Nirvana, written by vocalist and guitarist Kurt Cobain. It is the fourth song on the band's third and final studio album, In Utero, released in September 1993.

Often interpreted as a commentary on fame, "Rape Me" was written shortly before the release of the band's breakthrough album Nevermind, and was intended to be a lyrically literal anti-rape song. However, the song's bridge was written several months later, and does contain lyrics that reference the struggles Cobain and his wife, Courtney Love, faced with the media following Nirvana's mainstream success. The song's title and lyrics led to MTV blocking Nirvana from performing it at the 1992 MTV Video Music Awards, before it had been released, and also contributed to In Utero initially not being sold by American big-box stores Walmart and Kmart.

"Rape Me" was released as the album's second single in December 1993, packaged as a double A-side with "All Apologies". It reached number 32 on the UK Singles Chart and also reached the Top 40 in Belgium and Ireland. It was the band's final original single before Cobain's suicide in April 1994.

== Early history ==
"Rape Me" was written by Cobain on an acoustic guitar in Los Angeles in May 1991, around the time the band's second album, Nevermind, was being mixed. It was first performed live on June 18, 1991, at The Catalyst in Santa Cruz. The earliest live versions of the song featured a guitar solo instead of a bridge.

The song's lyrics led to controversy even before it had been officially released. The band had wanted to play it during their appearance at the 1992 MTV Video Music Awards, but according to Nirvana manager Danny Goldberg in his 2019 Cobain biography Serving the Servant, MTV president Judy McGrath was worried that the song "would make it seem like MTV was normalizing rape." Goldberg recalled reminding McGrath on the phone of Cobain's "commitment to feminism" and assured her that "Rape Me" was an anti-rape song, like "Polly" on Nevermind, but said McGrath "wasn't having it" and wanted the band to play their latest single, "Lithium," instead. The band eventually agreed, but Cobain still played a few seconds of "Rape Me" at the start of the performance, which resulted in the live broadcast almost going to commercial. In Serving the Servant, Goldberg refuted common reports that the network threatened to fire Amy Finnerty, an MTV employee and friend of the band, or boycott other artists signed to Geffen Records, if Nirvana played "Rape Me", saying that "the MTV people were under a lot of pressure to get good ratings, but they weren't bullies, just noodges."

"Rape Me" was first recorded in the studio in October 1992, during a two-day demo session with Jack Endino at Word of Mouth in Seattle, Washington. Two takes of the song were recorded, one of which was instrumental, the other of which featured lead vocals by Cobain and backing vocals by drummer Dave Grohl. Cobain was holding his then-infant daughter Frances Bean Cobain on his lap when he recorded his vocals on the second take, and she can be heard crying on the recording. This version of the song was released on the Nirvana rarities box set, With the Lights Out, in November 2004, and on the compilation album Sliver: The Best of the Box in November 2005.

== In Utero ==
The final studio version of "Rape Me" was recorded in February 1993 by Steve Albini at Pachyderm Studio in Cannon Falls, Minnesota, for the band's third and final studio album, In Utero. The instruments for the song were recorded on February 15. The following day, Cobain completed his vocals for the album during a reported six-hour session.

According to Albini, Cobain's screaming during the song's ending was intentionally recorded so that it "just overwhelms the band and becomes this really uncomfortable presence." However, the album's more abrasive vocals in general were softened in the mastered version.

== Post-In Utero ==
On September 25, 1993, the band performed the song, along with "Heart-Shaped Box," on Saturday Night Live at NBC Studios in New York City. It was the band's first show with second guitarist Pat Smear. The song was again performed on television on February 4, 1994 for the show Nulle Part Ailleurs in Paris, France.

The final live performance of "Rape Me" was at Nirvana's last concert, at Terminal 1 of Munich-Riem Airport in Munich, Germany on March 1, 1994.

== Composition and lyrics ==
=== Music ===
The song's instrumental opening bars, which feature Cobain using pick scratching while playing the verse chord progression, has led to frequent comparisons to the guitar riff of the band's 1991 breakthrough single, "Smells Like Teen Spirit". Will Bryant of Pitchfork wrote that "the four-chord riff that drags the song through the motions is an almost direct inversion of the famous 'Smells Like Teen Spirit' riff", while Cobain biographer Charles R. Cross described the song as having "the same catchy soft/loud dynamic as 'Teen Spirit'", which "created a perfect Cobain aesthetic – beautiful, haunting and disturbing". "Rape Me" was written after "Smells Like Teen Spirit", but before Nevermind had been released.

=== Lyrics ===
"Rape Me" is an anti-rape song, written from the point of view of the victim. As Cobain explained to Spin's Darcey Steinke in 1993, "It's like she's saying, 'Rape me, go ahead, rape me, beat me. You'll never kill me. I'll survive this and I'm gonna fucking rape you one of these days and you won't even know it.'" Gillian G. Garr described the song's lyrics as "part submissive invitation, part defiant taunt, a mix that confused and disturbed many listeners", and led to Cobain frequently having to explain the song's meaning.

In a 1993 Rolling Stone interview, Cobain addressed the song's controversy, saying that he had "gone back and forth between regretting it and trying to defend myself," and that he "was trying to write a song that supported women and dealt with the issue of rape." As he explained to interviewer David Fricke:

"It's not a pretty image. But a woman who is being raped, who is infuriated with the situation . . . it's like 'Go ahead, rape me, just go for it, because you're gonna get it.' I'm a firm believer in karma, and that motherfucker is going to get what he deserves, eventually. That man will be caught, he'll go to jail, and he'll be raped. 'So rape me, do it, get it over with. Because you're gonna get it worse.'"

When asked by MUCH's Erica Ehm in an August 1993 interview how the band was helping to raise awareness about sexism, Cobain replied, "By writing songs as blunt as 'Rape Me'." He stated that the lyrics were meant to be so direct that no one could misinterpret the song's meaning.

American musician Tori Amos commented on the song in a 1994 interview with the NME, saying that she "thought it was very clear what it was about....It's a defiant song. But the scariest thing to a rape victim are the words 'rape me'. When I first heard it I broke out in a cold sweat, but when you get over that you realize he's turning it back on people." In 1996, Jim Dillon, reverend of the hoaxical Church of Kurt Cobain, stated that "in essence, the real message [of 'Rape Me'] is one of a Christian theme – treat me the way you want me to treat you".

The song has also been interpreted as an attack on the press for its perceived mistreatment of Courtney Love. While most of the song was written before Nevermind was released, the bridge, which was written later, contains lyrics that address his occasionally contentious relationship with the press. As Cobain explained to Nirvana biographer Michael Azerrad, "It was actually about rape ... but now I could definitely use it as an example of my life for the past six months or year, easily." In line with this interpretation, Azerrad suggested that the chorus lyric "I'm not the only one" was Cobain's way of saying that Love and their infant daughter, Frances Bean Cobain, were being hurt along with him by the press and public attention. According to Azerrad, the bridge lyric "my favorite inside source" was a reference to the manager of an unnamed Seattle band Cobain and Love suspected of being anonymously interviewed for a controversial Vanity Fair profile of the couple published in September 1992.

== Release ==
"Rape Me" was released as a double A-side single with "All Apologies" on December 6, 1993 on CD, cassette, and 7" and 12" vinyl record formats. The single was not released commercially in the United States.

The song was relabeled "Waif Me" on the censored Walmart and Kmart version of In Utero, released in March 1994. The chain stores had originally refused to carry the album because of the song's title, as well as the fetus collage on the back cover, which was also edited. Cobain had originally wanted to retitle the song "Sexually Assault Me," but decided on the meaningless title "Waif Me," knowing that another four-letter word was required in order to make a quick graphic change. The song's uncensored title was listed in the booklet, and the recording remained the same. Cobain defended the band's decision to release a censored version of the album by explaining, "One of the main reasons I signed to a major label was so people would be able to buy our records at Kmart. In some towns, that's the only place kids can buy records."

In November 1993, "Rape Me" was voted the third "Most Wanted to be Heard" song by listeners of the Hawaii Free Radio. In Israel, it was voted in at number 15 on the IBA's "Voice of Israel" singles chart.

=== Critical reception ===
In his Rolling Stone review of In Utero, Fricke wrote that "'Rape Me' opens as a disquieting whisper, Cobain intoning the title verse in a battered croon, which sets you up beautifully to get blind-sided by the explosive hook line." Phil Alexander of Kerrang! noted that "Kurt kickstarts Rape Me with a familiar and doubtlessly intended …Teen Spirit shuffle...[and] ripple[s] with Kurt's poignant observations, allowing fleeting glimpses at his anger and frustration without ever resorting to the trite and obvious." David Browne of Entertainment Weekly wrote that "the gripping 'Rape Me' opens with the chords of 'Teen Spirit'...and builds into a furious rant with lyrics as dumb as anything on a death-metal anthem ("My favorite inside source/I’ll kiss your open sores"). All of this is more articulate than any Soundgarden lyric, but too often, Cobain just comes off sounding petulant."

=== Criticism ===
"Rape Me" has occasionally received criticism for its intentionally blunt handling of sensitive subject matter. John Mulvey of the NME wrote that "while you can't doubt Cobain's personal political correctness, there's a distinct moral dubiousness about welding the words 'RAPE ME!' to In Utero's best sing-along chorus." Pitchfork's Will Bryant wrote that the song, despite its victim-empowering intent, "comes off as a shallow and transparent attempt to court controversy."

In 2019, Jenna Bush Hager revealed that her father, George W. Bush, prior to becoming U.S. President, broke one of her Nirvana CDs due to the lyrics of "a really bad song", implied to be "Rape Me".

=== Legacy ===
In 1999, "Rape Me" was voted number 90 in Kerrang!'s 100 Greatest Rock Tracks Ever!. In 2015, Rolling Stone placed it at number 31 on their ranking of 102 Nirvana songs, with Julianne Escobedo Shepherd calling it "the closest to an actual Bikini Kill song that [Cobain] would ever write, using the lyrics as a woman-empowering taunt to show would-be rapists that their victims' spirits would not be tamped." In 2019, The Guardian ranked it at number 17 on their list of 'Nirvana's 20 greatest songs'.

"Rape Me" was re-released on both of Nirvana's greatest hits albums, Nirvana (2002) and Icon (2010).

== Music video ==
According to a 1993 Chicago Sun-Times article by Jim DeRogatis, Cobain was told that MTV were "squeamish" about a potential "Rape Me" music video, which played a role in the band's decision to release "Heart-Shaped Box" as In Utero's lead single instead. As DeRogatis wrote, "Rape Me" was "the catchiest [song] on the album; it isn't hard to imagine it becoming a hit – and a Madonna-size scandal."

Ultimately no music video was made for the song, although two treatments were published posthumously in Cobain's Journals in 2002. They included scenes set in a prison, footage of flowers and seahorses as well as a man being prepared for a gynecological exam. A 23-page "Rape Me" music video script, listing Jeffery Plansker as director, sold on eBay in January 2003 for $620.

In 1999, the Saturday Night Live version of "Rape Me" began being aired as a music video on MTV2 to promote the album Saturday Night Live: The Musical Performances, Volume 2, on which it appeared as the opening track. Video of the performance was released on the DVD of the same name.

== Accolades ==
Year	Publication	Country	Accolade	Rank
1998	Kerrang!	United Kingdom	20 Great Nirvana Songs Picked by the Stars	6
1999	Kerrang!	United Kingdom	100 Greatest Rock Tracks Ever	90

== Track listings ==
"Rape Me" was released as a double A-side with "All Apologies".

CD single and 12-inch vinyl

1. A. "All Apologies" – 3:50
2. A. "Rape Me" – 2:49
3. B. "Moist Vagina" - 3:34 (Previously Unreleased)

Cassette and 7-inch vinyl

1. A. "All Apologies" – 3:50
2. A. "Rape Me" – 2:49

== Personnel ==
- Kurt Cobain – vocals, guitar
- Krist Novoselic – bass guitar
- Dave Grohl – drums

== Charts ==
1993–1994 weekly chart performance for "Rape Me"
Chart (1993–1994)	Peak position
Belgium (Ultratop 50 Flanders)	43
Belgium (VRT Top 30 Flanders)	30
European Hot 100 Singles (Music & Media)	77
Iberian Airplay (Music & Media)	15
Ireland (IRMA)	20
UK Singles (Official Charts)	32
UK Rock & Metal Singles (CIN)	14
US College Radio Top Cuts (CMJ)	3
US Rock Tracks National Airplay (Radio & Records)	57

1995–1996 weekly chart performance for "Rape Me"
Chart (1995–1996)	Peak position
Denmark (Tracklisten) Charted on the singles chart as part of the Singles box set	5
European Hot 100 Singles (Music & Media) Charted on the singles chart as part of the Singles box set	55
France (SNEP) Charted on the singles chart as part of the Singles box set	17

== Certifications ==
Certifications for "Rape Me"
Region	Certification	Certified units/sales
Australia (ARIA)	Gold	35,000^{‡}
New Zealand (RMNZ)	Gold	15,000^{‡}
United Kingdom (BPI) Sales since 2004	Silver	200,000^{‡}
United States (RIAA)	Platinum	1,000,000^{‡}
^{‡} Sales+streaming figures based on certification alone.

== Other releases ==
- An acoustic demo of the song, recorded on a boombox in 1991 and featuring Cobain on vocals and acoustic guitar, appeared on the Nirvana box set With the Lights Out, released in November 2004. The same version was re-released on the compilation album Sliver: The Best of the Box in November 2005.
- A live version, recorded at the Paramount Theatre in Seattle on October 31, 1991, appeared on the live video Live at the Paramount, released in September 2011. Cobain introduced the song as being about "hairy, sweaty, macho redneck men. Who rape."
- A brief audio clip of the song's outro, from its performance at the Seattle Center Coliseum in Seattle on September 11, 1992, featured in a collage of live footage in the live video Live! Tonight! Sold Out!!, released in November 1994.
- A 2013 Albini remix of the studio version was released on the 20th anniversary "Deluxe" and "Super Deluxe" versions of In Utero in September 2013.
- A live version, from the band's MTV-recorded performance at Pier 48 in Seattle on December 13, 1993, appeared on the Live and Loud DVD, released in September 2013. "Rape Me" was among the songs on an edited version of the concert that first aired on MTV on December 31, 1993. The Live and Loud DVD also featured rehearsal footage of the song from the band's soundcheck.
- The version recorded for Nulle Part Ailleurs in Paris on February 4, 1994 appeared as bonus material on the Live and Loud DVD.
- The 30th anniversary "Super Deluxe" reissue of In Utero, released in October 2023, featured two additional live versions of the song, from the band's concerts at the Great Western Forum in Inglewood, California on December 30, 1993, and at the Seattle Center Arena in Seattle on January 7, 1994.

== In popular culture ==
"Rape Me" was parodied by American animated sitcom The Simpsons in the January 2008 episode, "That '90s Show", which featured the song "Shave Me" being performed by Sadgasm, a grunge band fronted by lead character Homer Simpson, in the early 1990s. It also featured "Shave Me" later being parodied by guest star "Weird Al" Yankovic as "Brain Freeze".

In the South Park episode "Hummels & Heroin", Cartman, Kenny, Kyle, and Butters perform a Barbershop Quartet cover of "Rape Me" for a retirement home.

In October 2021, the American drama Succession used "Rape Me" in the episode "The Disruption" when Kendall ordered his assistants to play the song on the speakers to counter Shiv addressing the sexual assault allegations towards Waystar Royco. Love praised the show's use of the song in an Instagram post, saying that she had "never been so proud of approving one of Kurt's songs" and that it was "as if they truly understood" the song's meaning.
