= About a Girl (Nirvana song) =

1989 song by Nirvana

Song by Nirvana

from the album Bleach
- Released: June 15, 1989
- Recorded: December 1988
- Genre: Alternative rock; jangle pop; grunge
- Length: 2:48
- Label: Sub Pop
- Songwriter: Kurt Cobain
- Producer: Jack Endino

"About a Girl"

Single by Nirvana

from the album MTV Unplugged in New York
- B-side: "Something in the Way" (live)
- Released: October 24, 1994
- Recorded: November 18, 1993
- Genre: Acoustic rock; alternative rock; pop rock
- Length: 3:37
- Label: DGC
- Songwriter: Kurt Cobain
- Producer: Nirvana · Scott Litt

Nirvana singles chronology
"Pennyroyal Tea" (1994)	"About a Girl" (1994)	"Polly" (1994)

Music video
- "About a Girl" on YouTube

"About a Girl" is a song by American rock band Nirvana, written by vocalist and guitarist Kurt Cobain. It is the third song on their debut album, Bleach, released in June 1989.

Frequently described as one of Cobain's strongest and most melodic early compositions, "About a Girl" was written about his then-girlfriend Tracy Marander. In the 1998 documentary Kurt and Courtney, Marander revealed that Cobain had never told her the song was about her, and that she found out only after reading the 1993 Nirvana biography Come As You Are: The Story of Nirvana by Michael Azerrad.

A live, acoustic version, recorded during Nirvana's MTV Unplugged appearance in November 1993, was released as a single in October 1994, to promote the album MTV Unplugged in New York. It was the first single released since Cobain's death in April 1994, reaching number one on Billboard's Modern Rock Tracks chart and number 22 on Billboard's Hot 100 Airplay chart.

== Background ==
"About a Girl" was written in 1988, reportedly after Cobain spent an afternoon repeatedly listening to Meet the Beatles!, the 1964 second American release by the Beatles. The earliest known recording is a solo electric home demo that was posthumously released on the band's rarities box set, With the Lights Out, in November 2004. Featuring alternate lyrics, it was recorded at Cobain's home in Olympia, Washington, in 1988. The song debuted live at a dorm party at the Evergreen State College in Olympia, Washington, in February 1989.

== Recording and release ==
=== Bleach version ===
"About a Girl" was first recorded in the studio in December 1988 by Jack Endino at Reciprocal Recording in Seattle, Washington. It was one of nine songs recorded during the 30-hour, six-day session that ended up on the band's July 1989 debut album, Bleach. As Endino recalled in a 2004 interview with Rob Nash of The Independent, "They just banged it out—they had it all figured out; they were rehearsed. They would do the songs in one or two takes; [Cobain would] get the vocals as one overdub, that would be it, and then on to the next song. So it was a pretty easy record to make."

=== Later recordings ===
On October 26, 1989, a version of "About a Girl" was recorded by Ted de Bono at Maida Vale Studios in London, England, during Nirvana's first BBC Peel Session. The full session was first broadcast on November 22, 1989. Another version was recorded on November 1, 1989, at Villa 65 in Hilversum, Netherlands for the VPRO radio show, Nozems-a-Gogo. A live version, recorded at the Pine Street Theatre in Portland on February 9, 1990, appeared on the British 12-inch and CD versions of the "Sliver" single in 1991.

On November 18, 1993, "About a Girl" was performed as the opening song on the band's MTV Unplugged appearance at Sony Music Studios in New York City. This version of the song featured Pat Smear on the second guitar. "About a Girl" was performed for the final time live at Nirvana's last concert, at Terminal Eins in Munich, Germany on March 1, 1994.

The studio version of "About a Girl" was re-released on the band's first "best of" compilation, Nirvana, in October 2002. The MTV Unplugged version was re-released on a second hits compilation, Icon, in August 2010.

== Composition and lyrics ==
=== Music ===
"About a Girl" is an alternative rock song that runs for two minutes and forty-eight seconds. It is written in the time signature of common time, with a moderately fast rock tempo of 130 beats per minute. "About a Girl" is composed in the key of E minor, while Kurt Cobain's vocal range spans one octave and six notes, from the low-note of B_{3} to the high-note of A_{4}. The song primarily alternates between the open chords of Em and G in the verses and follows a chord progression of C♯_{5}–G♯_{5}–F♯_{5}–C♯_{5}–G♯_{5}–F♯_{5}–E_{5}–A_{5}–C_{5} during the refrain. During the verses, Cobain repeats the same two chords as Krist Novoselic's bass line continuously ascends while a vocal harmony and tambourines appear in the background. The song's chorus features slight key modulation, where chords land slightly away from the place expected. "About a Girl" has an aching, wistful melody which Cobain sings over simple chord progressions. His electric guitar playing grows rawer and noisier throughout the track. It was also described as a pop song by Cobain, producer Butch Vig, and original Nirvana drummer Chad Channing.

=== Lyrics ===
According to Chad Channing, the band's Bleach-era drummer, Cobain did not have a title for the song when he first brought it into the studio. When asked what it was about, Cobain replied, "It's about a girl."

The "girl" was Tracy Marander, Cobain's then-girlfriend, with whom he lived at the time. The lyrics address the couple's fractured relationship, caused by Cobain's refusal to get a job, or to share cleaning duties at their apartment, which housed many of his pets. During arguments on the subject, Cobain occasionally threatened to move into his car, at which point Marander would usually relent. Cobain never told Marander that he had written "About a Girl" for her. In the 1998 Nick Broomfield documentary Kurt and Courtney, Marander revealed that she only found out after reading Michael Azerrad's 1993 Nirvana biography, Come as You Are: The Story of Nirvana.

== Release and reception ==
In a 1993 Rolling Stone interview with David Fricke, Cobain revealed that he had initially been apprehensive about including "About a Girl" on Bleach, knowing that it risked alienating the band's then largely grunge fanbase. "Even to put 'About a Girl' on Bleach was a risk," he explained. "I was heavily into pop, I really liked R.E.M., and I was into all kinds of old ‘60s stuff. But there was a lot of pressure within that social scene, the underground—like the kind of thing you get in high school. And to put a jangly R.E.M. type of pop song on a grunge record, in that scene, was risky."

However, Endino was excited about the song, and even saw it as a potential single. In a 1997 interview with Gillian G. Gaar for Goldmine, he recalled Cobain's initial trepidation about including the song on Bleach.

"I think Kurt felt nervous about putting 'About a Girl' on there, but he was very insistent on it. He said, 'I've got a song that's totally different from the others, Jack, you've gotta just humour me here, because we're gonna do this real pop tune.' The question was raised at some point, gee, I wonder if Sub Pop's going to like this, and we decided, 'Who cares?' Sub Pop said nothing. In fact, I think they liked it a lot."

In 2004, Butch Vig, who produced Nirvana's 1991 breakthrough album Nevermind, cited "About a Girl" as the first hint that there was more to Nirvana than grunge. "Everyone talks about Kurt's love affair with... the whole punk scene, but he was also a huge Beatles fan, and the more time we spent together the more obvious their influence on his songwriting became," Vig told the NME.

=== Critical reception ===
In a March 1989 Melody Maker interview, music journalist Everett True named "About a Girl" as one of several songs on Bleach, along with "Blew," "Big Cheese" and "Sifting," that were "crafted round a firm base of tune, chorus, melody."

=== Legacy ===
"About a Girl" has retrospectively been cited as early evidence of Cobain's talent as a pop songwriter. Stephen Thomas Erlewine of Allmusic wrote that the song "illustrated signs of [Cobain's] considerable songcraft." Evan Rytlewskia of Pitchfork called it "a glimpse at the melodic impulses that would make [Cobain] one of the defining rock musicians of the ’90s." According to Will Bryant of Pitchfork, it was "curious, based on the clean guitars and tinny cymbals that dominate ["About a Girl"], how Nirvana ever came to be identified with grunge, the genuinely dirty and moody sound more readily associated with contemporaries Mudhoney, Soundgarden and Tad than the punk-metal hybrid Nirvana favored." The NME described it as "Kurt's first true masterpiece," which "showed Nirvana's soft underbelly could be just as arresting as their ear-splitting thrashes."

In 2004, the NME ranked "About a Girl" second on their list of the "20 Greatest Nirvana Songs Ever." The same year, Q ranked it second on their list of the "10 Greatest Nirvana Songs Ever." In 2015, it was placed at number eight on Rolling Stone's ranking of 102 Nirvana songs. It was ranked at number 112 on Pitchfork's 2015 list of "The 200 Best Songs of the 1980s," with Raymond Cummings calling it a "sharp, perceptive, well-constructed, and almost Beatles-esque" song "that demonstrated a potential beyond grunge's ghetto." In 2019, it was ranked eighth on The Guardian's list of "Nirvana's 20 greatest songs". In 2023, it was ranked third on The A.V. Club's "Essential Nirvana: Their 30 greatest songs, ranked" list, with Stephen Thomas Erlewine describing it as being "driven by one of Kurt Cobain’s prettiest melodies."

"About a Girl" is a BMI award-winning song. English singer-songwriter Elvis Costello named "About a Girl" as a personal favourite in 2004.

=== In pop culture ===
The song inspired the title of the 1998 novel About a Boy, by British author, Nick Hornby.

=== Covers ===
In November 2019, American rock band Puddle of Mudd performed an acoustic version of "About a Girl" during a session at SiriusXM. The cover has been widely criticized and ridiculed, with most of the focus being placed upon vocalist Wes Scantlin's strained, off-key vocals.

On April 24, 2020, the song was performed by American musician Post Malone as part of his 15-song Nirvana tribute concert live-streamed on YouTube, which raised more than $4 million for the COVID-19 Solidarity Response Fund.

== MTV Unplugged version ==
"About a Girl (Unplugged)"
A 20-second sample of "About a Girl" from the live album MTV Unplugged in New York (1994). The slower live rendition features a stripped-down arrangement and tighter, more subdued performance, transforming the song into a moody ballad.

The MTV Unplugged version of "About a Girl" was released as a single in October 1994, to promote the album MTV Unplugged in New York, released the following month. It was the only commercial single released from the album, and featured the Unplugged version of "Something in the Way" as the b-side. Cobain opened the song by saying, "This is off our first record. Most people don't own it".

The performance was released as a music video which peaked at number 2 on MTV's most played videos in the US in December 1994, and was also played on MTV Latino, The Box, and MuchMusic in Canada. It was placed in the Buzz Bin on MTV Europe, before being placed into heavy rotation. It was also played on Video Smash Hits and Rage in Australia.

It was the number one most played song on Italian radio station Radio DeeJay in December 1994.

=== Reception ===
Reviewing MTV Unplugged in New York for the NME, John Harris wrote that the song's "musical backdrop suggests The Beatles in 1964, at their lovelorn best: minor-key introspection gives way to regular traces of lightened-up calm, only to regain the upper hand within bars. ... For that reason, encapsulated in the fact that it rides on a divinely simple verse/ chorus/ verse undertow, it may be the most beautiful song here".

== Track listings ==
MTV Unplugged version.

- Australian CD, French CD, French CD distributed in Europe
1. "About a Girl" (Cobain)
2. "Something in the Way" (Cobain)
- US promo CD
1. "About a Girl" (Cobain)
- Mexican promo split CD and Italian jukebox split 7-inch with Aerosmith
1. "About a Girl" (Cobain)
2. "Blind Man" (Performed by Aerosmith)

== Charts ==
=== Weekly charts ===
Chart (1994–95)	Peak position
Australia (ARIA)	4
Australia Alternative (ARIA)	1
Belgium (Ultratop 50 Flanders)	13
Belgium (VRT Top 30 Flanders)	12
Canada Top Singles (RPM)	10
Canada Contemporary Hit Radio (The Record)	9
Canada Contemporary Album Radio (The Record)	10
Denmark (Hitlisten)	30
Europe (European Hot 100 Singles)	64
Europe Hit Radio Top 40 (Music & Media)	22
Europe AC Radio (Music & Media)	17
Europe (European Dance Radio)	15
Finland (The Official Finnish Charts)	8
France (SNEP)	23
Francophone Airplay (Music & Media)	7
French Airplay (Music & Media)	7
Iberia Airplay (Music & Media)	1
Iceland (Íslenski Listinn Topp 40)	1
Italy (Musica e dischi)	20
Italian-language Areas Airplay (Music & Media)	2
Netherlands (Dutch Top 40)	26
Netherlands (Single Top 100)	22
Quebec Airplay (ADISQ)	17
Sweden (Sverigetopplistan)	20
UK Singles (OCC); Import CD	185
UK Airplay (ERA)	54
US Pop Airplay (Billboard)	29
US Radio Songs (Billboard)	22
US Mainstream Rock (Billboard)	3
US Alternative Airplay (Billboard)	1
US CHR Pop Top 40 (Radio & Records)	28
US CHR Top 40 (Radio & Records)	34
US Rock Tracks Top 60 (Radio & Records)	2
US Alternative Top 50 (Radio & Records)	2

Chart (1999)	Peak position
UK Rock & Metal (Official Charts)	33

Chart (2024)	Peak position
UK Rock & Metal (Official Charts)	32

=== Year-end charts ===
Chart (1994)	Position
Canada Top Singles (RPM)	93
US Top Rock Tracks (Radio & Records)	80
US Top Alternative (Radio & Records)	47

Chart (1995)	Position
Canada Top Singles (RPM)	88
France (SNEP)	83
Iceland (Íslenski Listinn Topp 40)	23
US Album Rock Tracks (Billboard)	28

== Certifications ==
Region	Certification	Certified units/sales
Australia (ARIA)	Platinum	70,000^{‡}
Italy (FIMI) Sales since 2009	Gold	50,000^{‡}
New Zealand (RMNZ) Unplugged version	2× Platinum	60,000^{‡}
Spain (Promusicae)	Gold	30,000^{‡}
United Kingdom (BPI) Sales since 2006	Platinum	600,000^{‡}
^{‡} Sales+streaming figures based on certification alone.

== Accolades ==
Year	Publication	Country	Accolade	Rank
1998	Kerrang!	United Kingdom	20 Great Nirvana Songs Picked by the Stars	8
2004	Q	United Kingdom	High Spirits: 10 Greatest Nirvana Songs Ever	2
2011	NME	United Kingdom	Nirvana: Their 10 Best Tracks	2
2023	The A.V. Club	United States	Essential Nirvana: Their 30 greatest songs, ranked	3

== Other releases ==
- A solo home demo which first appeared on With the Lights Out was re-released on the compilation album Sliver: The Best of the Box in November 2005.
- A full-band rehearsal demo appeared on the DVD of With the Lights Out, along with several other songs from the same session. It was filmed in December 1988 by Krist's brother, Robert Novoselic, above a hair salon in Aberdeen, Washington owned by their mother, Maria Novoselic. Reviewing the box set in November 2004, Mark Richardson of Pitchfork wrote, "It's a huge kick to see Cobain and Novoselic so young and goofy [at the session], hanging out with a few neighborhood dudes and jamming like any other local band ... but then they bust out 'About a Girl' and we remember that this is not your everyday garage band."
- The full Pine Street concert, including "About a Girl," was re-released on the 20th anniversary "Deluxe" edition of Bleach in November 2009.
- A live version, recorded at the Paramount Theatre in Seattle, Washington on October 31, 1991, appeared on the live video, Live! Tonight! Sold Out!!, in November 1994. The full concert was released on DVD and Blu-Ray as Live at the Paramount in September 2011.
- A live version, recorded at the Paradiso in Amsterdam, the Netherlands on November 25, 1991, appeared as bonus material on Live! Tonight!! Sold Out!! when it was released on DVD in November 2006. The full show was released on CD, vinyl and Blu-Ray in November 2021, on the 30th-anniversary edition of Nevermind
- In addition to the Paradiso show, the 30th anniversary "Super Deluxe" version of Nevermind featured the band's full performances at Del Mar Fairgrounds in Del Mar, California on December 29, 1991, The Palace in Melbourne, Australia on February 1, 2021, and the Nakano Sunplaza in Tokyo, Japan on February 19, 1992, all of which featured versions of "About a Girl."
- A live version, from the band's headlining appearance at the 1992 Reading Festival in Reading, England, appeared on Live at Reading, released on CD and DVD in November 2009.
- A live version, recorded on December 13, 1993, at Pier 48 in Seattle, Washington for MTV, was released on the live video Live and Loud in September 2013.
- The 30th anniversary "Super Deluxe" reissue of Nirvana's final album, In Utero, released in October 2023, included the band's full concerts at the Great Western Forum in Inglewood, California on December 30, 1993, and at the Seattle Center Arena in Seattle on January 7, 1994, both of which featured versions of "About a Girl".

=== Unreleased studio versions ===
- The versions of the song recorded for the BBC in London on October 26, 1989, and for VPRO in Hilversum on November 1, 1989, both remain unreleased.

== Personnel ==
Bleach

- Kurt Cobain - vocals, guitar
- Krist Novoselic - bass
- Chad Channing - drums, tambourine

MTV Unplugged in New York

- Kurt Cobain - vocals, electro-acoustic guitar
- Krist Novoselic - acoustic bass
- Dave Grohl - drums
- Pat Smear - acoustic guitar
