= Journals (Cobain) =

Collection of writings and drawings by Kurt Cobain

- First edition hard cover
- Author: Kurt Cobain
- Language: English
- Genre: Autobiography
- Publisher: Riverhead Books
- Publication date: 2002 hardcover, 2003 paperback
- Publication place: United States
- Media type: Print (paperback and hardcover)
- Pages: 280 (hardcover); 294 (paperback)
- ISBN: 978-1-57322-232-7
- OCLC: 50333745
- Dewey Decimal: 782.42166/092 B 21
- LC Class: ML420.C59 A3 2002

Second edition paperback cover

Journals is a collection of writings and drawings by American musician Kurt Cobain, who was the lead singer and guitarist of Nirvana. Though the content is undated, it is arranged in approximately chronological order. It was published in hardcover by Riverhead Books in November 2002, and in paperback by Riverhead Books in November 2003. Journals opened at No. 1 on the New York Times bestseller list (non-fiction). It contains scrawled notes, drafted letters, shopping lists, and drawings by Cobain.

== Release ==
Published in November of 2002, Journals was released one month after the release of Nirvana, the self-titled greatest hits album which features the previously unreleased song, You Know You're Right, the last recorded song of Cobain's band before his suicide in 1994. Billboard thus described the book as a "music driven blockbuster" with a first printing of nearly 375,000 copies.

== Letters ==
Journals contains a number of letters, either early drafts or unsent, that Cobain wrote to friends or peers. Included are friendly letters to Dale Crover of the Melvins, Tobi Vail of Bikini Kill and Eugene Kelly of the Vaselines, a tender letter to his wife, Courtney Love, a letter thanking The Advocate following his interview with the gay and lesbian magazine in early 1992, and even a letter to Simon Fair Timony, the then-nine-year-old stepson of Half Japanese member Jad Fair, asking him to contribute artwork for what would become In Utero. It also includes a letter from Cobain and Nirvana bassist Krist Novoselic firing then-drummer Dave Foster from the band, and angry letters from Cobain to MTV and Rolling Stone.

== Lists ==
Like many music fans, Cobain often made lists of his favorite bands and albums, several of which are included in Journals. His lists included artists from indie and alternative rock (the Vaselines, Pixies, the Breeders, Sonic Youth, R.E.M., PJ Harvey, Meat Puppets, Pavement); protopunk, punk rock and hardcore (the Stooges, the Velvet Underground, Butthole Surfers, Sex Pistols, the Clash, the Slits, the Saints, Black Flag, Bad Brains, Fear, Minor Threat, the Faith, Rites of Spring, Flipper, Fang); hip-hop (Public Enemy, N.W.A); blues (Lead Belly); and hard rock and metal (Black Sabbath's Master of Reality, Led Zeppelin, AC/DC,). On his "Top 50" albums list, offerings from such obscure artists as the Shaggs, Tales of Terror, Marine Girls, Swans and the Frogs coexist with albums by the Beatles, David Bowie, and Aerosmith. The 1973 Stooges record Raw Power is listed at No. 1 on all of Cobain's "favorite album" lists. He also noted an interest in grunge and the Seattle Sound (Melvins, Green River, Mudhoney, Screaming Trees, early Soundgarden).

== Nirvana-related writings ==
Contained in Journals is an assortment of directly Nirvana-related material, including embryonic lyric drafts, early album tracklists, and even a set of unused liner notes Cobain had apparently written for In Utero in 1993. The lyric sheets are especially revealing, showing that some songs, including the band's biggest hit "Smells Like Teen Spirit", underwent major revisions before being recorded for release, while others, such as "Come as You Are", were changed very little, at least from the drafts included. The tracklists are also of interest, revealing, for example, that Cobain had intended to release "girl" and "boy" sides of Nirvana's breakthrough album Nevermind, with songs such as "In Bloom" and "Lithium" on the girl side, and songs like "Sliver" and "Polly" on the boy side.

Punk is musical freedom. It's saying, doing and playing what you want. Nirvana means freedom from pain and suffering in the external world and thats close to my definition of punk rock, exclaim guitarist Kurt Kobain.

— pages 156–159: draft of record company bio of the band for Nevermind. This bio was never used.

== Drawings ==
Journals contains a number of Cobain's rough sketches and drawings, some of which are light and humorous, such as his drawing of "Eddie", the Iron Maiden mascot, his sketch of the band as choirboys on a hypothetical Nirvana album cover, and his drawing of "Elvis Cooper", in which Elvis Presley and Alice Cooper are combined into a single entity, but many of which are darker or more violent. Included in the latter are his drawings of a sniper shooting members of the swastika-toting Ku Klux Klan from a rooftop (with swastikas drawn backwards), his drawing of a soldier with a football helmet hanging from a noose, and a sketch of his own emaciated body, as well as a comic strip called "Mr. Moustache", in which an unborn child kicks through its mother's belly to kill its macho father, which arguably influenced the song of the same title off of Nirvana's first album, Bleach. The strip was first published in Michael Azerrad's 1993 Nirvana biography, Come as You Are. Journals also contains a number of drawings of images which would later become a familiar part of Nirvana lore, such as Dante's Vestibule of Hell (which appeared on a Nirvana t-shirt), a skinny man on a cross (which appeared in the "Heart-Shaped Box" music video), and male seahorses giving birth (which appeared on the cover of the "All Apologies"/ "Rape Me" single).

== Entries about his health ==
Throughout his life, Cobain was physically fragile and sickly; suffering from scoliosis, undiagnosed stomach ailments (which some argue led to his heroin addiction), and a touring schedule that required him to spend hours each night singing, screaming and stage diving. On top of his physical issues, he was diagnosed with clinical depression during his teenage years. In his private journals, that were later published after his death, Cobain details the horrific stomach pain he experienced. He says that eating was always followed by a relentless, "burning nauseous pain in the upper part of [his] stomach lining". He writes that the pain would, at times, leave him crunched up in his bathroom floor, paralyzed by the discomfort, continuously regurgitating nothing but blood and water. Though the root of his gastrointestinal issues was never determined, and close friends of Cobain argue that it was simply an excuse for his heroin habit, he continuously struggled with such issues through his life. Other bandmates have later recalled Cobain's strange fascination with bodily functions. During a 1989 Nirvana tour, one of the band's singers, Tad Doyle, suffered from daily nausea and vomiting episodes; Kurt Danielson, a close friend of Doyle's, recalls that Cobain would voluntarily hold a bucket for Doyle to vomit into and often appeared excited to see the end result. Danielson remembers that Cobain admired Doyle for his struggle, and viewed his sickness as artistic and authentic. Cobain's obsession with bodily fluids can be more publicly seen in his graphic song lyrics; from sex, to urination, to vomiting, almost 90% of his songs and art were somehow influenced by the human body. In his journal entries, Cobain would often misspell words and put an anatomical twist on his spelling of a word.

== Reception ==
Seattle Weekly said this: "The journals are like an exploded diagram of a tormented soul, a maelstrom of self-pity, intolerant pride, morbid introspection, ingenious self-delusion, merciless self-knowledge, showbiz revulsion, starstruck effusion, Faustian ambition, otherworldly detachment, and an iron will helpless to help itself. Packed into 280 pages are shocking confessions, sweetly eloquent letters to brilliant friends, hard-nosed band plans, fulminating political screeds, obscene cartoons, haunting video treatments, and lyrical poetry of tremulous Romantic sensitivity, Bukowskian crudity, dadaist flippancy, and modernist opacity." Furthermore, its release reportedly polarized fans, some of whom felt it constituted an invasion of Cobain's privacy, and others of whom saw it as a unique opportunity to better understand him.

Billboard reported that the simultaneous release of the Nirvana hits set helped fire cross-promotion at retail and that the album release was providence.

Cobain's daughter, Frances Bean Cobain, stated in 2018 that she will never read her father's journals and that she regretted her mother's decision to publish them in 2002.
