= In Bloom =

1992 single by Nirvana

Single by Nirvana

from the album Nevermind
- B-side: "Sliver" (live): "Polly" (live)
- Released: November 30, 1992
- Recorded: May 1991
- Studio: Sound City (Van Nuys, California)
- Genre: Grunge
- Length: 4:11
- Label: DGC
- Songwriter: Kurt Cobain (Note: On the original release of Nevermind, the lyrics were credited to Cobain while the music was credited to the whole band. Later releases credit this song solely to Cobain.)
- Producers: Butch Vig; Nirvana

Nirvana singles chronology
"Lithium" (1992)	"In Bloom" (1992)	"Puss / Oh, the Guilt" (1993)

Music videos
- "In Bloom" (Alternate Version) on YouTube; "In Bloom" (Nevermind Version) on YouTube

"In Bloom" is a song by American rock band Nirvana, written by vocalist and guitarist Kurt Cobain. It appears as the second track on the band's second album, Nevermind, released by DGC Records in September 1991. The Nevermind version was recorded at Sound City Studios in May 1991, and was produced by the band themselves and Butch Vig. It is the second of two versions of the song that were released in 1991, the earlier of which was recorded in 1990, while the band was still signed to their original record label, Sub Pop. This version was initially released as a music video only, on the Sub Pop Video Network Volume 1 VHS compilation.

"In Bloom" was released as Nevermind's fourth and final single in November 1992 and generated heavy American airplay, reaching number 5 on the US Mainstream Rock chart, despite never being released as a physical single in the United States. The international release of the single made the Top 10 in Ireland and Portugal, the Top 20 in Finland and New Zealand, and the Top 30 in Sweden and the United Kingdom. The Nevermind version was accompanied by a new music video, directed by American filmmaker Kevin Kerslake, which won Best Alternative Video at the 1993 MTV Video Music Awards.

== Early history ==
According to Nirvana's bassist Krist Novoselic, "In Bloom" "originally sounded like a Bad Brains song," before being slowed down and reworked by Cobain at home. In a 2002 Rolling Stone interview with David Fricke, Novoselic recalled that Cobain "went home and [he] hammered it. He kept working on it. Then he called me on the phone and said, 'Listen to this song.' He started singing it on the phone. You could hear the guitar. It was the 'In Bloom' of Nevermind, more of a pop thing."

The song was first performed live on April 1, 1990, at the Cabaret Metro in Chicago. The following day, the band began work on recording a new release for their then-label Sub Pop, at Smart Studios in Madison, Wisconsin with producer Butch Vig. Among the eight songs recorded during the five-day session was "In Bloom", which originally featured a bridge that Vig removed by physically cutting it out of the 16-track master tape with a razor blade, and throwing it in the garbage. The original plan of releasing the songs recorded during this session on a single release were abandoned later in the year, after the exit of drummer Chad Channing. The band instead used the material as a demo tape, which circulated amongst the music industry and generated interest in the group among major record labels. However, a few songs from the session still appeared on various official releases in 1990 and 1991. "In Bloom" was released as a music video only, on the Sub Pop Video Network Volume 1 VHS compilation in 1991.

=== Nevermind version ===
"In Bloom" was re-recorded by Vig at Sound City Studios in Van Nuys, California in May 1991, during the sessions for the band's second album and major label debut, Nevermind. It was one of the first songs worked on during the sessions, due to Vig's familiarity with it from his previous session with the band. Like the other songs recorded at Smart Studios, the arrangement for "In Bloom" was left mostly unchanged, with the band's new drummer Dave Grohl staying close to what Channing had played.

According to Vig, Cobain's impatience with recording multiple vocal takes made it difficult to acquire a master vocal take. In the 2005 documentary Classic Albums: Nirvana – Nevermind, Vig revealed the methods he used to get Cobain to record multiple takes, which included tricking him into believing that certain parts were not properly recorded and needed to be done again, and reminding him that the Beatles' John Lennon double-tracked his vocals in the studio. The varying intensity of Cobain's vocals from one take to the next, and from the verses to the choruses, also presented a problem for Vig, who had to adjust the input levels "on the fly" while recording Cobain. Ultimately, Vig was able to edit several takes together into a single master, due to the consistency of Cobain's vocal phrasing.

Vig also decided to have Grohl sing high harmonies, double-tracking them as he did with Cobain's. Grohl initially had difficulty hitting the proper notes, but ultimately was able to sing what Vig wanted. The original studio version of "In Bloom" featured no harmonies, possibly due to time constraints.

== Composition ==
"In Bloom"
"In Bloom" is a typical example of the loud-quiet techniques employed by Nirvana on Nevermind. The guitar in the song's chorus are heavily layered as a result of the production style of Butch Vig.

=== Music ===
Like many other Nirvana songs, "In Bloom" shifts back and forth between quiet verses and loud choruses. Cobain uses a Mesa Boogie guitar amplifier for the verses, and during the chorus he switches to a Fender Bassman amp (suggested by Vig) for a heavier, double-tracked fuzztone sound. The rhythm section of Novoselic and Grohl kept its parts simple; Grohl stated it was "an unspoken rule" to avoid unnecessary drum fills, while Novoselic said he felt his role was about "serving the song".

=== Lyrics ===
According to the 1993 Nirvana biography Come As You Are by Michael Azerrad, "In Bloom" was originally written about "the jocks and shallow mainstream types" of the underground music scene the band began to find in their audience after the release of their 1989 debut album, Bleach. As Azerrad points out, the song's lyrics "translated even better to the mass popularity the band enjoyed" following the breakthrough success of their second album, Nevermind. "The brilliant irony," Azerrad wrote, "is that the tune is so catchy that millions of people actually do sing along to it." English journalist Everett True suggested the song may also have addressed the band's discomfort with being part of the grunge movement of the early 1990s, saying that "I assumed it was directed towards the fans who would show up at concerts with signs saying Even Flow [a Pearl Jam song] on one side and Rape Me – I think – on the other: the fans who did not understand there was a point of difference between Nirvana and other Seattle bands or media representations of grunge. I've always associated the song with [In Utero single] Rape Me. Like they're a pair."

In his biography of Cobain, Heavier Than Heaven, Charles R. Cross asserted that the song was a "thinly disguised portrait" of Cobain's friend Dylan Carlson.

== Release and reception ==
Originally Cobain wanted to release In Bloom on a promotional EP as well as their first major label debut single after signing with DGC, for the then-second album sessions with Sub Pop, entitled Sheep. The EP would've been titled NIRVANA Sings Songs of the Vaselines, the Wipers, Devo, & Nirvana.

"In Bloom" was released as the fourth and final single from Nevermind on November 30, 1992. The commercial single was only released in Europe, while promotional copies were released in the United States. The 12-inch vinyl and CD versions of the commercial single featured live versions of "Polly" and "Sliver", from the band's show at Del Mar Fairgrounds in Del Mar, California on December 28, 1991, as B-sides. The 7-inch vinyl and cassette versions featured only "Polly". The single peaked at number 28 on the British singles chart. Despite the lack of a commercial release domestically, the song reached number five on the Billboard Album Rock Tracks chart. In Israel, it was voted in at number 15 on the IBA's "Voice of Israel" singles chart. It was also voted in at number 15 on Poland's LP3 chart in 1992.

Music journalist Everett True wrote an uncharacteristically unfavorable review of the single in Melody Maker, accusing it of "milking" the success of Nevermind. "Whoop whoop bloody whoop", wrote True, "forgive me if I don't sound too thrilled. This release is stretching even my credulity beyond repair. Like, milking a still-breathing (sacred) cow, or what? Badly inferior live versions of 'Polly' and 'Sliver' on the flip don't help matters either."

=== Legacy ===
In 2011, Rolling Stone ranked "In Bloom" at number 415 on their list of the "500 Greatest Songs of All Time". In 2019, the magazine ranked it second on their ranking of 102 Nirvana songs. In 2023, Stephen Thomas Erlewine ranked "In Bloom" at number 10 on the A.V. Club's "Essential Nirvana: Their 30 greatest songs, ranked" list. According to Nielsen Music's year-end report for 2019, "In Bloom" was the seventh most-played song of the decade on mainstream rock radio with 131,000 spins. All of the songs in the top 10 were from the 1990s.

In 2019, Cobain was given a songwriting credit on the single "Panini" by American rapper and singer Lil Nas X, due to the song having a similar chorus melody as "In Bloom". As Nas X explained in a SiriusXM interview, "I put out the snippet [of 'Panini'] and everyone was like, 'Wow, he's sampling Nirvana.' I was like, 'Where? I'm not sampling Nirvana, this beat doesn't have Nirvana in it.' Then, I listened to 'In Bloom' in full, and I was like, 'Oh, okay.'" Nas X revealed that the song was approved by Kurt's daughter, Frances Bean Cobain, and that the experience "actually got me into [Nevermind] for the first time."

In a 2021 interview with the Los Angeles Times, Cobain's widow, Courtney Love, said she was "very firmly in the club that says 'In Bloom' should have been the first single" from Nevermind, calling it "a far better song" than "Smells Like Teen Spirit".

== Music videos ==
Nirvana drummer Chad Channing in the music video for the original version of "In Bloom" that was recorded at Smart Studios. This video is now called Alternate Version

Nirvana parodying early 1960s variety shows in the second "In Bloom" music video that was filmed for the Nevermind version, entirely in black and white.

=== Sub Pop / Alternate version ===
The first music video for "In Bloom", for the Smart Studios version, was directed by Steve Brown, and filmed in New York City in April 1990, shortly after the song had been recorded. It features footage of the band walking around lower Manhattan, including the South Street Seaport, the Lower East Side, and Wall Street on April 25, as well as rehearsal footage and clips from the band's show at Maxwell's in Hoboken, New Jersey on April 28. Novoselic had shaved his head as punishment for what he perceived to be a bad performance at the Pyramid Club in New York City on April 26, and so appears with hair in some shots, and with a shaved head in others.

The video was first released in 1991 on the Sub Pop Video Network Volume 1 compilation. It was re-released on the DVD of the band's rarities box set, With the Lights Out, in November 2004. The audio of this version appeared on some copies of the promotional EP, Selections from With the Lights Out, which was released shortly before the box set, but not on the box set itself. It did not appear on a commercial release until the full Smart session was included on disc two of the 20th anniversary "Deluxe" and "Super Deluxe" versions of Nevermind in September 2011.

The video is listed as Alternate Version on Nirvana's official YouTube channel.

=== Nevermind version ===
The second music video for "In Bloom", for the Nevermind version, was directed by Kevin Kerslake, who had directed the videos for the band's previous two singles from Nevermind, "Come as You Are" and "Lithium". The video was filmed on October 15, 1992 and first aired in late November. According to Michael Azerrad, Cobain's original concept for the video was "a surrealistic fable about a little girl who is born into a Ku Klux Klan family and one day realizes how evil her parents are." This proved to be "too ambitious," so Cobain instead came up with the idea of making a video that parodied the musical performances of wholesome pop bands on early 1960s variety shows, such as The Ed Sullivan Show.

The low-def black and white footage was filmed on old Kinescope cameras, following Cobain's request that Kerslake use authentic cameras from the period, and the band's performance was improvised. The satirical tone was a result of Cobain being "so tired for the last year of people taking us so seriously . . . I wanted to fuck off and show them that we have a humorous side to us". The video begins with an unnamed variety show host, played by Doug Llewelyn, former host of American reality show The People's Court, introducing Nirvana to an in-studio crowd of young fans, whose screaming is heard throughout the duration of the song. The band members, whom the host refers to as "thoroughly all right and decent fellas," perform dressed in suits, while Cobain wears glasses that made him dizzy. As Cobain explained in a 1992 Melody Maker interview, "We wanted to be like The Beatles – no, The Dave Clark Five, I was wearing glasses – we would never make fun of The Beatles." Novoselic had cut his hair short for the video, and liked it so much he kept it that way afterwards. As the song progresses, the band members destroy their instruments and the set.

Three edits of the Kerslake video were made. Cobain wanted MTV to first play the first edit, featuring the band in suits only, and eventually replace it with a second edit featuring the band wearing dresses and performing in their traditional manner, which included destroying the set. However, Cobain was skeptical that MTV's alternative rock show 120 Minutes, which insisted on premiering the video, would properly convey the humor of the "pop idol" version. As a result, the familiar third edit was produced which contained shots of the band in both suits and dresses. The original edit of the video never aired.

The "In Bloom" music video won the award for Best Alternative Video at the 1993 MTV Video Music Awards, and topped the music video category in the 1992 Village Voice Pazz & Jop critics' poll. It was placed into heavy rotation on MTV in the US, where it was the number two most played video for thirteen consecutive weeks. It was also played on MTV Europe. It was also played on MTV Australia, Rage and Video Smash Hits in Australia.

== Formats and track listings ==
All lyrics written by Kurt Cobain, all music written by Nirvana.

- 7", cassette
1. "In Bloom" – 4:17
2. "Polly" (live) – 2:47
- 12", CD
1. "In Bloom" – 4:17
2. "Sliver" (live – Del Mar – 28.12.1991) – 2:06
3. "Polly" (live – Del Mar – 28.12.1991) – 2:47

== Personnel ==
Nirvana

- Kurt Cobain – guitar, lead vocals
- Krist Novoselic – bass
- Dave Grohl – drums, backing vocals

Technical Personnel

- Butch Vig – producer, engineer
- Nirvana – producer, engineer
- Andy Wallace – mixing

== Charts ==
=== Weekly charts ===
Chart (1992–1993)	Peak position
Australia (ARIA)	73
Australia Alternative (ARIA)	19
Canada Contemporary Album Radio (The Record)	71
European Hot 100 Singles (Music & Media)	65
Finland (The Official Finnish Charts)	16
Ireland (IRMA)	7
Netherlands (Single Top 100)	87
New Zealand (Recorded Music NZ)	20
Portugal (AFP)	10
Sweden (Sverigetopplistan)	30
UK Network Singles (MRIB)	29
UK Singles (Official Charts)	28
UK Airplay (ERA)	27
UK Rock & Metal Singles (CIN)	1
US Mainstream Rock (Billboard)	5
US AOR Tracks (Radio & Records)	5

Chart (1995–1996)	Peak position
Denmark (Tracklisten); Charted on the singles chart as part of the Singles box set	5
European Hot 100 Singles (Music & Media); Charted on the singles chart as part of the Singles box set	55
France (SNEP); Charted on the singles chart as part of the Singles box set	17

Chart (2011)	Peak position
Belgium Back Catalog (Ultratop Wallonia)	41

=== Year-end charts ===
Chart (1993)	Peak position
US AOR Tracks (Radio & Records)	67

=== Decade-end charts ===
Chart (2010–2019)	Position
US Mainstream Rock (Nielsen Music)	7

== Certifications ==
Region	Certification	Certified units/sales
Australia (ARIA)	Platinum	70,000^{‡}
New Zealand (RMNZ)	Platinum	30,000^{‡}
United Kingdom (BPI) Sales since 2004	Gold	400,000^{‡}
United States (RIAA)	2× Platinum	2,000,000^{‡}
^{‡} Sales+streaming figures based on certification alone.

== Cover versions ==
Country musician Sturgill Simpson covered "In Bloom" as a country song on his 2016 album A Sailor's Guide to Earth, while Lil Nas X interpolated it for his 2019 song "Panini" (which was approved by Frances Bean Cobain). Sludge metal band Thou recorded the song in their 2020 collection of Nirvana covers, Blessings of the Highest Order.
