= Enter the Vaselines =

Compilation album by The Vaselines
- Released: 5 May 2009
- Recorded: 1986–89
- Genre: Indie pop, indie rock, jangle pop, alternative rock, noise pop
- Label: Sub Pop
- Producer: The Vaselines, Stephen Pastel, Jamie Watson

The Vaselines chronology
The Way of The Vaselines: A Complete History (1992)	Enter the Vaselines (2009)	Sex with an X (2010)

Professional ratings
Aggregate scores
Source	Rating
Metacritic	85/100
Review scores
Source	Rating
AllMusic	4.5/5 stars
The A.V. Club	A−
Cokemachineglow	81%
Drowned in Sound	8/10
The Line of Best Fit	92%
Pitchfork	8.0/10
PopMatters	7/10
Record Collector	3/5 stars
Uncut	4/5 stars
Under the Radar	8/10

Enter the Vaselines is a compilation album by the indie rock band The Vaselines, released on 5 May 2009 through the record label Sub Pop.

The album is a deluxe reissue of their 1992 compilation The Way of the Vaselines: A Complete History. Disc one compiles all tracks from their two previous EP's (Son of a Gun and Dying for It) and debut LP record (Dum-Dum - their only full-length release before 2010's Sex with an X), in chronological order of release, with the exception of the previously unreleased track "Bitch", which is inserted after what was the fourth track on Dum-Dum. Disc two includes demos and live tracks recorded in Bristol in December 1986 and London in June 1988. The mixes used of tracks 8–19 on disc one differ to the mixes used on the original Dum-Dum album and The Way of the Vaselines: A Complete History compilation, having been remixed by Jamie Watson at Chamber Studios in November 2008.

== Track listing ==
All songs written and composed by Eugene Kelly/Frances McKee except "You Think You're a Man" by Geoff Deane and "I Didn't Know I Loved You ('Til I Saw You Rock 'n' Roll)" by Gary Glitter/Mike Leander.

Disc 1

1. "Son of a Gun" – 3:46
2. "Rory Rides Me Raw" – 2:28
3. "You Think You're a Man" – 5:43
4. "Dying for It" – 2:22
5. "Molly's Lips" – 1:44
6. "Teenage Superstars" – 3:28
7. "Jesus Wants Me for a Sunbeam" – 3:31
8. "Sex Sux (Amen)" – 3:10
9. "Slushy" – 2:00
10. "Monsterpussy" – 1:43
11. "Bitch" – 2:42
12. "No Hope" – 3:21
13. "Oliver Twisted" – 2:49
14. "The Day I Was a Horse" – 1:29
15. "Dum-Dum" – 1:57
16. "Hairy" – 1:48
17. "Lovecraft" – 5:37
18. "Dying for It (The Blues)" – 3:09
19. "Let's Get Ugly" – 2:19

Disc 2

1. "Son of a Gun" (Demo) - 2:30
2. "Rosary Job" (Demo) - 3:01
3. "Red Poppy" (Demo) - 2:13
4. "Son of a Gun" (Live in Bristol) - 3:58
5. "Rosary Job" (Live in Bristol) - 3:24
6. "Red Poppy" (Live in Bristol) - 2:11
7. "Rory Rides Me Raw" (Live in Bristol) - 3:07
8. "You Think You're a Man" (Live in Bristol) - 1:48
9. "Dying For It" (Live in London) - 2:12
10. "Monsterpussy" (Live in London) - 1:58
11. "Let's Get Ugly" (Live in London) - 3:03
12. "Molly's Lips" (Live in London) - 2:14
13. "The Day I Was a Horse" (Live in London) - 2:37
14. "The Day I Was a Horse (Again)" (Live in London) - 2:50
15. "Sex Sux (Amen)" (Live in London) - 4:14
16. "I Didn't Know I Loved You ('Til I Saw You Rock 'N' Roll)" (Live in London) - 3:25
17. "Teenage Superstars" (Live in London) - 4:22

== Personnel ==
- Eugene Kelly – vocals, guitar, harmonica
- Frances McKee – vocals, guitar
- James Seenan – bass on tracks 4–19 (Disc one) and 9–17 (Disc two)
- Charlie Kelly – drums on tracks 4–19 (Disc one) and 9–17 (Disc two)
- Aggi Wright – keyboards on "Son of a Gun"
- David Keegan – lead guitar on "Dying for It"
- Sophie Pragnell – viola on "Dying for It","Jesus Wants Me for a Sunbeam" and "Oliver Twisted"
- Ian Beveridge – engineer
- Peter Haigh – engineer
- Stephen Pastel – producer, additional guitar and backing vocals on "You Think You're A Man"
- Gordon Rintoul – engineer
- Jamie Watson – steel guitar, Producer, Engineer, slide guitar on tracks 8–19 (Disc one)
- Stephen Watkins – mastering
- Jane Higgins – design
