= Verse Chorus Verse (Nirvana album) =

Unreleased live album by Nirvana

- The advanced cassette copies of the album. These show the early version of the double album.

Live album by Nirvana
- Released: Cancelled (Street date: October 31; scheduled release date: November 1, 1994)
- Recorded: 1989–1994
- Venue: Various
- Genre: Grunge
- Length: 1:53:39
- Label: DGC
- Producer: Nirvana

Nirvana chronology
In Utero (1993)	Verse Chorus Verse (1994)	MTV Unplugged in New York (1994)

Verse Chorus Verse is an unreleased live album by the American rock band Nirvana, scheduled for release on November 1, 1994. It was to be a double album comprising a CD of live performances on one CD and Nirvana's MTV Unplugged performance on the other. The album was canceled as Nirvana members Krist Novoselic and Dave Grohl found it emotionally overwhelming to compile material so soon after the death of Kurt Cobain earlier that year.

The subsequent track listing differs greatly from the track listing that was eventually released on 1996's From the Muddy Banks of the Wishkah. The title of the album is a sarcastic acknowledgement of the band's standard rock-song format and also comes from a Nirvana song of the same name that appeared on 1993's No Alternative benefit album. Concept art for Verse Chorus Verse was posted online in 2019 by graphic designer Robert Fisher, who created art for several Nirvana records.

== Development ==
Nirvana's record label DGC announced Verse Chorus Verse in August 1994. It was to be a double album, with live material from throughout Nirvana's career on one CD and their MTV Unplugged performance on the other, and was due for release on November 1 that year. In the United Kingdom, Music Week reported in October, 1994, that Verse Chorus Verse would be released two weeks before Nirvana's first home video, Live! Tonight! Sold Out!!, which was released there on November 14, 1994, and that the two releases would be promoted together. However, Nirvana bassist Krist Novoselic and drummer Dave Grohl found assembling the material so soon after Cobain's death emotionally overwhelming. Cashbox magazine announced that the album was being compiled in the September 3, 1994 issue, and then announced in the following issue dated September 10, 1994 that the plan had changed and that only the MTV Unplugged performance would be released.

Jim Merlis, head of Geffen, said the releases were planned due to high demand for new Nirvana recordings and the fact that the band's "Unplugged" set was already being widely bootlegged.

Although DGC had given the impression that the work on the live part had not progressed very far, and was why it was cancelled early on, Merlis, in a 1997 article for Goldmine, insisted that it was all complete bar mixing: “It was a whole cohesive album. And it’s different from the one that came out later [Wishkah]. They went back and started at square one with this [in 1996] because they gained a little perspective on it.” There was also a television advertisement made for the album.

A CD-Maxi single was planned, with concept artwork being shared by the art director, Robert Fisher, on Instagram in July, 2023. The CD-Maxi single would've included five songs: "About A Girl" (from Unplugged), "About A Girl" (Oct. 31, 1991 Paramount Theatre, Seattle), "Jesus Don't Want Me For A Sunbeam" (Oct. 31, 1991 Paramount Theatre, Seattle), "Pennyroyal Tea" (February 18, 1994 - Summon, Grenoble, France), and "On a Plain" (January 7, 1994 - Seattle Centre Arena, Seattle, WA). All songs would've been remixed from the original recordings by Scott Litt.

== Track listing ==
=== Disc 1 ===
All tracks are written by Kurt Cobain, except where noted.

No.	Title	Other writers	Length
1.	"Drain You" (Same version from From the Muddy Banks of The Wishkah. Mobile Recording by Westwood One at O’Brien Pavilion, recorded on Dec 28th 1991 at Del Mar, California.)		3:53
2.	"Aneurysm" (Same version from Wishkah. Mobile Recording by Westwood One at O’Brien Pavilion, recorded on Dec 28th 1991 at Del Mar, California.)	Cobain, Krist Novoselic, Dave Grohl	4:19
3.	"Breed" (Different from version on Wishkah. Mobile Recording by Westwood One at O’Brien Pavilion, recorded on Dec 28th 1991 at Del Mar, California.)		2:55
4.	"Serve The Servants" (Not on Wishkah; Recorded on Jan 7th 1994 at Seattle Center Arena, Seattle, WA, US.)		3:16
5.	"Smells Like Teen Spirit" (Same version from Wishkah. Mobile Recording by Westwood One at O’Brien Pavilion, recorded on Dec 28th 1991 at Del Mar, California.)	Cobain, Novoselic, Grohl	4:36
6.	"Spank Thru" (Different from version on Wishkah. Live Mix by Craig Montgomery,. Recorded Live at the Astoria Theatre in London, England on Dec. 3rd, 1989.)		2:58
7.	"Sliver" (Different from version on Wishkah. Mobile Recording by Westwood One at O’Brien Pavilion, recorded on Dec 28th 1991 at Del Mar, California.)		1:59
8.	"Dive" (Not on Wishkah. Live Mix by Craig Montgomery,. Recorded at the Astoria Theatre in London, England on Dec. 3rd, 1989.)	Cobain, Novoselic	4:06
9.	"Lithium" (Different from version on Wishkah. Mobile Recording by Westwood One at O’Brien Pavilion, recorded on Dec 28th 1991 at Del Mar, California.)		4:04
10.	"Rape Me" (Not on Wishkah. Recorded live on the Dogfish mobile truck at the Paramount Theatre, Seattle, Washington on Oct. 31, 1991.)		3:09
11.	"School" (Different from version on Wishkah. Live Mix by Craig Overbay, San Diego Sports Arena, San Diego California on Dec. 29th, 1993.)		2:52
12.	"Sappy (Verse Chorus Verse)" (Not on Wishkah; Recorded Nov 29th 1989 at "l'Usine", Geneva, Switzerland.)		2:57
13.	"Negative Creep" (Same version from Wishkah. Recorded by Andy Wallace at the Paramount Theatre, Seattle, October 31, 1991.)		2:48
14.	"Heart-Shaped Box" (Different from version on Wishkah. Live Mix by Craig Overbay. Remixed by Scott Litt. Recorded for MTV’s “Live and Loud” at Pier 48, Seattle, WA, on Dec 13, 1993.)		4:28
15.	"Blew" (Different from version on Wishkah. Live Mix by Craig Overbay. Remixed by Scott Litt. Recorded for MTV’s “Live and Loud” at Pier 48, Seattle, WA, on Dec 13, 1993.)		3:30
16.	"Scentless Apprentice" (Same version from Wishkah. Recorded for MTV Live and Loud by Scott Litt at Pier 48, Seattle, Dec 13, 1993)	Cobain, Novoselic, Grohl	3:31
17.	"Territorial Pissings" (Not on Wishkah. Mobile Recording by Westwood One at O’Brien Pavilion, recorded on Dec 28th 1991 at Del Mar, California.)	Cobain, Powers	4:21
Total length:			59:49

=== Disc 2: "MTV Unplugged in New York" ===
Track listing and times taken from advanced cassette. Recorded at Sony Music Studios in New York City on November 18, 1993.

All tracks are written by Kurt Cobain, except where noted.

No.	Title	Other writers	Length
1.	"About A Girl"		3:37
2.	"Come As You Are"		4:13
3.	"Jesus Doesn't Want Me For A Sunbeam"	Eugene Kelly, Frances McKee	4:37
4.	"The Man Who Sold the World"	David Bowie	4:20
5.	"Pennyroyal Tea"		3:40
6.	"Dumb"		2:52
7.	"Polly"		3:16
8.	"On A Plain"		3:44
9.	"Something In The Way"		4:01
10.	"Plateau"	Curt Kirkwood	3:38
11.	"Oh, Me"	Curt Kirkwood	3:26
12.	"Lake of Fire"	Curt Kirkwood	2:55
13.	"All Apologies"		4:23
14.	"Where Did You Sleep Last Night"	Traditional; arranged by Lead Belly	5:07
Total length:			53:50

== Personnel ==
Disc 1: Nirvana

- Kurt Cobain – vocals, guitar
- Krist Novoselic – bass
- Chad Channing - drums on "Sappy (Verse Chorus Verse)", "Spank Thru", and "Dive".
- Dave Grohl – drums on all tracks, except tracks 6,8, and track 12.

Additional musicians

- Pat Smear – rhythm guitar on "Serve The Servants", "Heart-Shaped Box", "School" and "Scentless Apprentice".
- Lori Goldston – cello on "Blew".

Disc 2: Nirvana

- Kurt Cobain – lead vocals, acoustic guitar, except on tracks 10, 11, and 12.
- Krist Novoselic – acoustic bass, accordion on track 3, acoustic rhythm guitar on tracks 10, 11, and 12.
- Dave Grohl – drums, backing vocals, acoustic bass on track 3.
- Pat Smear – acoustic guitar, except on tracks 5, 10, 11, and 12.

Additional musicians

- Lori Goldston – cello, except on tracks 1, 2, 5, 10, 11, and 12.

Meat Puppets

- Cris Kirkwood – acoustic bass and backing vocals on tracks 10, 11, and 12.
- Curt Kirkwood – acoustic lead guitar on tracks 10, 11, and 12.

== Gallery ==
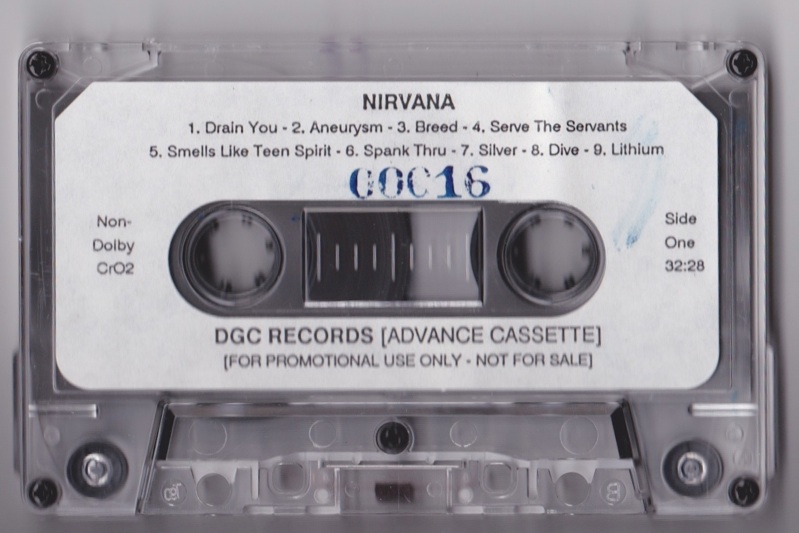
Verse Chorus Verse promo tape - Side 1

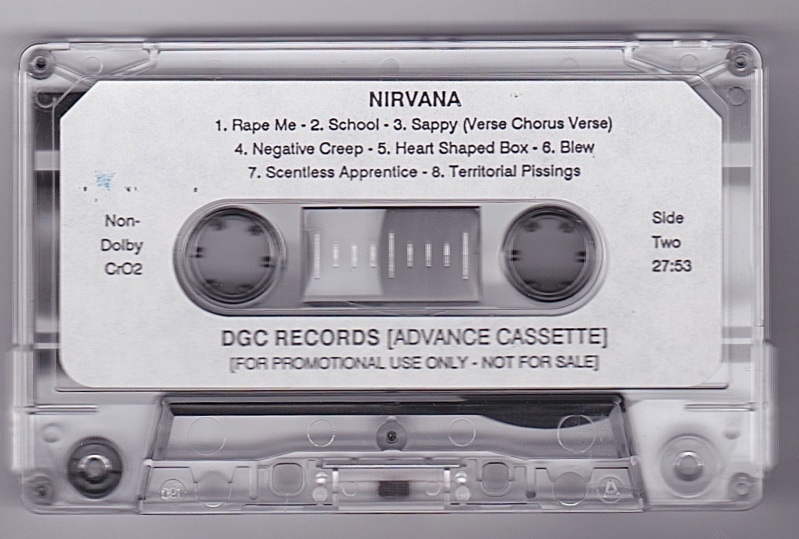
Verse Chorus Verse promo tape - Side 2
