= The Way of The Vaselines: A Complete History =

The Way Of The Vaselines: A Complete History

Compilation album by The Vaselines
- Released: 1 May 1992
- Recorded: 1987–89
- Studio: Berkeley St. (Glasgow); Pier House (Edinburgh); Chamber (Edinburgh)
- Genre: Indie pop, indie rock, jangle pop, alternative rock, noise pop
- Length: 55:17
- Label: Sub Pop
- Producer: Stephen Pastel, The Vaselines, Jamie Watson

The Vaselines chronology
Dum-Dum (1989)	The Way Of The Vaselines: A Complete History (1992)	Enter the Vaselines (2009)

Professional ratings
Review scores
Source	Rating
AllMusic	4.5/5 stars
Chicago Tribune	3.5/4 stars
Robert Christgau	A−
The Encyclopedia of Popular Music	3/5 stars

The Way of the Vaselines: A Complete History is a compilation album by the indie rock band the Vaselines, released in May 1992 by Sub Pop Records.

== Background ==
The album compiles every previous release by the band, the two EPs Son of a Gun (1987) and Dying For It (1988), as well as their first long-playing album Dum-Dum (1989), in chronological order of release. Three additional tracks are included: "Dying for It (The Blues)", "Let's Get Ugly", and the previously unreleased "Bitch".

The band had broken up around the time that Dum-Dum was issued, and had never gained a huge following. However, covers of their songs by Nirvana had brought them new exposure, which prompted Sub Pop to put together this compilation. Production is credited to the Vaselines, in collaboration with Stephen Pastel on the tracks from Son of a Gun and Dying for It, and with Jamie Watson on the remainder.

== Critical reception ==
Entertainment Weekly wrote that "these recovering Catholics tackle subjects as complex as atheism and murder and as mundane as a particularly chafing bike seat, all with lyrics so simple a 6-year-old could have written them." Pitchfork said, "The 19-track collection that Sub Pop released at Cobain's suggestion has long been the best way to listen in on Kelly and McKee's flirty chaos." Robert Christgau called it, "one of those punk miracles that makes you think anyone can do it".

== Track listing ==
All songs written by Eugene Kelly and Frances McKee, except "You Think You're a Man", by Geoff Deane (erroneously credited to Divine).

1. "Son of a Gun" – 3:46
2. "Rory Rides Me Raw" – 2:28
3. "You Think You're a Man" – 5:43
4. "Dying for It" – 2:22
5. "Molly's Lips" – 1:44
6. "Teenage Superstars" – 3:28
7. "Jesus Wants Me for a Sunbeam" – 3:31
8. "Sex Sux (Amen)" – 3:10
9. "Slushy" – 2:00
10. "Monsterpussy" – 1:43
11. "Bitch" – 2:42
12. "No Hope" – 3:21
13. "Oliver Twisted" – 2:49
14. "The Day I Was a Horse" – 1:29
15. "Dum-Dum" – 1:57
16. "Hairy" – 1:48
17. "Lovecraft" – 5:37
18. "Dying for It (The Blues)" – 3:09
19. "Let's Get Ugly" – 2:19

== Personnel ==
Credits adapted from CD liner notes.

The Vaselines

- Eugene Kelly
- Frances McKee

Additional musicians

- Aggi Wright – keyboard (1)
- James Seenan – bass guitar (4–7)
- Charles Kelly – drums (4–7)
- Sophie Pragnell – viola (4–7, 13)
- David Keegan – lead guitar (4)
- Jamie Watson – slide guitar (8–19)
- Stephen Pastel – additional guitar, backing vocals

Technical

- Gordon Rintoul – engineer (1–3)
- Peter Haigh – engineer (4–7)
- Ian Beveridge – engineer (4–7)
- Stephen Pastel – producer (1–7)
- The Vaselines – producers (1–19)
- Jamie Watson – engineer (8–19), producer (8–19)
- Jane Higgins – design
- Eugene Kelly (as Eugenius K) – liner notes
