= The Reindeer Section =

Scottish indie rock supergroup

- Promotional photograph from 2002

Background information
- Origin: Glasgow, Scotland
- Genres: Indie rock
- Years active: 2001–2002
- Label: Bright Star
- Past members: Ben Dumville; Lee Gorton; Sam Morris; Colin Macpherson; Malcolm Middleton; Aidan Moffat; William Campbell; Charles Clark; Neil Payne; Gareth Russell; Richard Colburn; Mick Cooke; Bobby Kildea; Iain Archer; Jenny Reeve; Sarah Roberts; Roddy Woomble; John Cummings; Colin MacIntyre; Gary Lightbody; Mark McClelland; Jonny Quinn; Norman Blake; Eugene Kelly; Johnny MacArthur; Jonathan Renton; Michael Bannister; Roy Kerr; Paul Fox; Marcus Mackay; Gill Mills; Stacie Sievewright

The Reindeer Section are a Scottish indie rock supergroup formed in 2001 by Gary Lightbody of Snow Patrol, which released albums and gigged in 2001 and 2002.

Lightbody describes the band's sound as "pretty much all very slow, quiet, folky-type stuff. Stuff that I really love listening to, like Low, for example, and Neil Young and Joni Mitchell and all that end of things. It's sort of inspired by those records rather than by the American rock music that inspired me to start a band in the first place."

The songs "You Are My Joy" and "Cartwheels" were featured on the 2009 Snow Patrol best-of album, Up to Now.

== History ==
=== Formation and Y'All Get Scared Now, Ya Hear!: 2001 ===
The Reindeer Section arose – according to Lightbody – out of a chance get-together of musicians at a Lou Barlow gig in Glasgow in 2001, at which Lightbody drunkenly laid down the challenge to others to "make an album together", to which everyone said "yeah yeah". Lightbody "went home and next day wrote the album" and later convinced Johnny Davis of Bright Star to fund a recording session and release the proposed album. The group met over three days of rehearsal and ten days of recording to produce the first album. Y'All Get Scared Now, Ya Hear! was released on 20 October 2001 with a mini tour, the first venue of which was Belfast's The Limelight. In television, the track "Will You Please Be There For Me" was used in the closing of episode 39 of NBC's Ed.

=== Son of Evil Reindeer and hiatus: 2002 ===
Son of Evil Reindeer was released ten months after the first, with a slightly different line-up. The single, "You Are My Joy" appeared on US show, Grey's Anatomy, and on the fourth series of US TV series Queer as Folk. The song "Cartwheels" appeared on "The Second Chance", an episode of The O.C.. The band's most recent gig was on 14 December 2002 at the Queen Margaret Union in Glasgow.

== Band members ==
- Alfie
  - Ben Dumville
  - Lee Gorton
  - Sam Morris
- Arab Strap
  - Colin Macpherson
  - Malcolm Middleton
  - Aidan Moffat
- Astrid
  - William Campbell
  - Charlie Clark
  - Neil Payne
  - Gareth Russell
- Belle & Sebastian
  - Richard Colburn
  - Mick Cooke
  - Bobby Kildea
- Cadet
  - Iain Archer
- Eva
  - Jenny Reeve (Strike The Colours)
  - Sarah Roberts
- Idlewild
  - Roddy Woomble
  - Gareth Russell (joined Idlewild in 2006)
- Mogwai
  - John Cummings
- Mull Historical Society
  - Colin MacIntyre
- Snow Patrol
  - Gary Lightbody
  - Mark McClelland
  - Jonny Quinn
- Teenage Fanclub
  - Norman Blake
- The Vaselines
  - Eugene Kelly
- The Wendys
  - Johnny MacArthur
  - Jonathan Renton
- The Moth & the Mirror
  - Stacey Sievwright
- Michael Bannister
- Roy Kerr
- Paul Fox
- Marcus Mackay
- Gill Mills
- The Noisy Geese

== Discography ==
=== Albums ===
Release date	Album	Record label	Highest chart position
Release date	Album	Record label	UK Albums Chart
30 October 2001	Y'All Get Scared Now, Ya Hear!	Bright Star Recordings	107
13 August 2002	Son of Evil Reindeer	Bright Star Recordings, Play It Again Sam (PIAS)	110

=== Singles ===
Release date	Song	Album	Record label	Highest chart position
Release date	Song	Album	Record label	UK Singles Chart
10 June 2002	"You Are My Joy"	Son of Evil Reindeer	Bright Star Recordings	89
