= I'll Be a Sunbeam =

Children's Christian hymn

- by Nellie Talbot
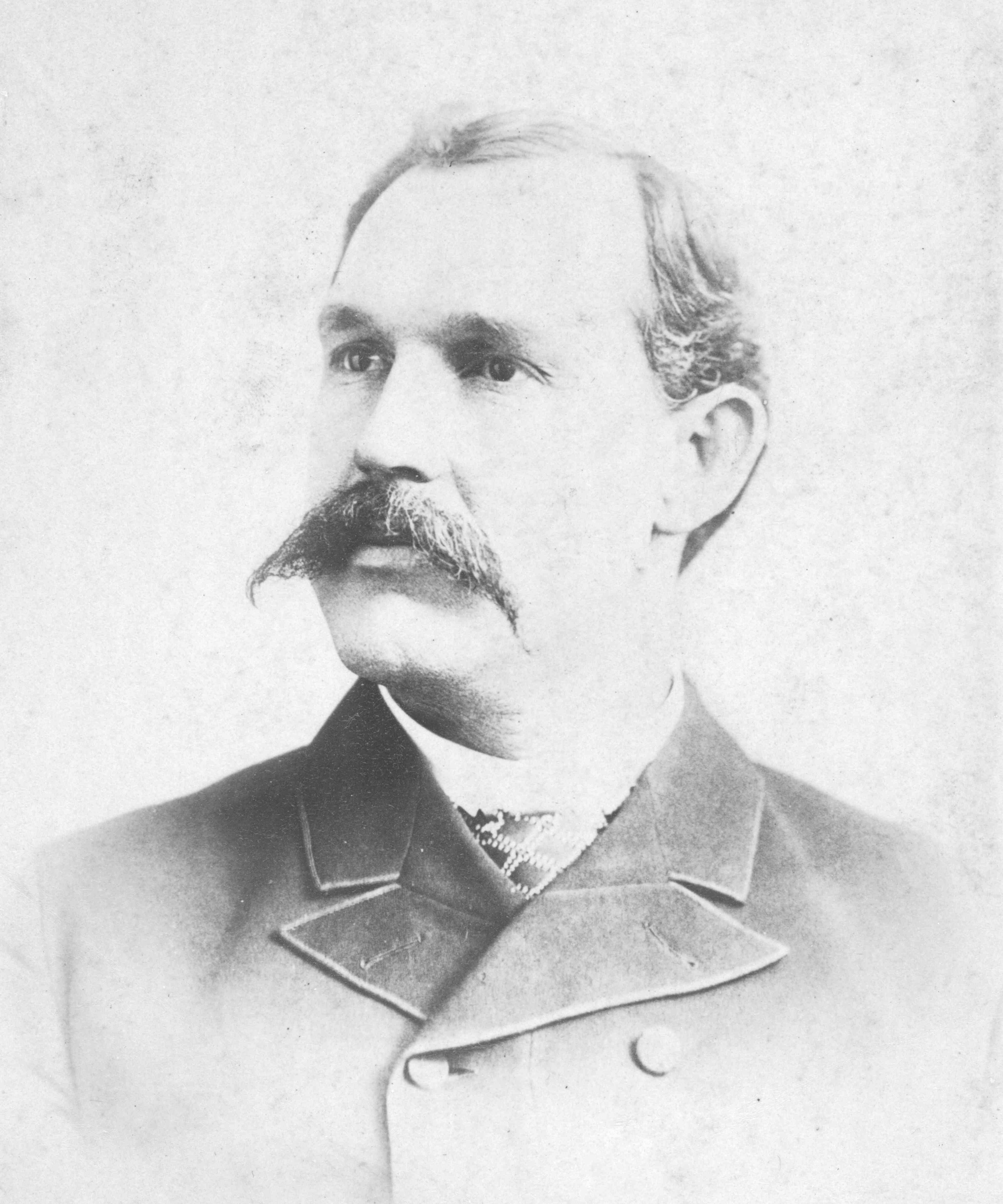
- E. O. Excell
- Genre: Hymn
- Based on: Judges 5:31
- Meter: 8.6.8.6 with refrain
- Melody: by E. O. Excell
- Published: 1905 by Excell

"I'll Be a Sunbeam" (also called "Jesus Wants Me for a Sunbeam") is a popular children's Christian hymn composed by Nellie Talbot; it is sung to music composed in 1900 by Edwin O. Excell.

Due to its age, the hymn has entered the public domain in the United States. Published in Chicago by Excell as hymn number 137 in his Praises in 1905, the words and music were anthologized at least three more times in other hymnals before 1923. Virtually nothing is known about lyricist Nellie Talbot; attempts to search census records suggest that she may have been born in Missouri in 1874 and was living in Chicago in 1910, but these identifications are speculative.

The Church of Jesus Christ of Latter-day Saints has a children's primary program which includes Sunbeams (a class for 3-year-olds). The theme song to this class is, "Jesus Wants Me For a Sunbeam."

== Lyrics ==
Jesus wants me for a sunbeam,
To shine for Him each day;
In every way try to please Him,
At home, at school, at play.

Refrain

A sunbeam, a sunbeam,
Jesus wants me for a sunbeam;
A sunbeam, a sunbeam,
I'll be a sunbeam for Him.

Jesus wants me to be loving,
And kind to all I see;
Showing how pleasant and happy
His little one can be.

Refrain

I will ask Jesus to help me
To keep my heart from sin,
Ever reflecting His goodness,
And always shine for Him.

Refrain

I'll be a sunbeam for Jesus;
I can if I but try;
Serving Him moment by moment,
Then live with Him on high.

Refrain

== Parodies ==
This song was parodied in 1987 as "Jesus Wants Me for a Sunbeam" by The Vaselines; shortly thereafter they renamed it "Jesus Doesn't Want Me for a Sunbeam". The latter version was covered by Nirvana.

The hymn was also referenced in the lyrics of the song "Alibi" by Elvis Costello ("Maybe Jesus wants you for a sunbeam?").
