= Verse-chorus-verse =

Verse-chorus-verse may refer to:

- Verse-chorus form, a musical form common in popular music
- Either of 2 songs by American rock band Nirvana, written by Kurt Cobain:
  - Verse Chorus Verse, a never-completed Nevermind outtake.
  - Sappy, removed at the last minute from In Utero and placed on No Alternative instead.
  - Verse Chorus Verse, an unreleased live album by the band, scheduled for release in late 1994.
- The Verse, the Chorus (2009), 1st album by the band Ivan & Alyosha
- VerseChorusVerse, the moniker of Northern Irish singer-songwriter Tony Wright
