= Sunny Moon =

Studio album by Frances McKee
- Released: 16 April 2006
- Recorded: 2004
- Length: 42:33
- Label: Analogue Catalogue
- Producer: Julie McLarnon

Professional ratings
Review scores
Source	Rating
Disorder	4/10 stars

Sunny Moon is the first solo album by Frances McKee. Containing a much softer and more mellow style of music than her previous days in the Vaselines, the music is more reminiscent of her work in Suckle. All songs were written by McKee except "You Know Who I Am" (Leonard Cohen). The album was described by The Scotsman as a "maudlin but beautiful collection of songs".

== Track listing ==
1. "The Kindness of Strangers" – 2:51
2. "The Country Song" – 4:12
3. "Silence Will Do" – 3:29
4. "Childish Memories" – 3:46
5. "You Know Who I Am" – 4:05
6. "Without Reason" – 4:27
7. "Vicious Tongue" – 3:17
8. "Secret Dreams" – 4:06
9. "Drink in the Sun" – 3:11
10. "Wasted" – 4:26
11. "Limbo" – 4:43

== Personnel ==
- Frances Mckee – vocals, guitar, piano
- Julie McLarnon – guitar, effects, percussion, accordion
- Brian Edwards – drums, bass guitar
- Paul Blakesley – bass guitar, backing vocals
- Semay Wu – cello, piano
- Sonia Crohl – cello
- Fiona Menzines – piano, flute
- Lauren Hyde – drums
- Filip Vervaeke – backing vocals
