= Oomalama =

Studio album by Eugenius
- Released: 29 September 1992
- Recorded: 1991–1992, Chamber Studios, Edinburgh
- Genre: Alternative rock
- Length: 52:10
- Label: Atlantic, Paperhouse Records
- Producer: Jamie Watson, Eugenius

Eugenius chronology
Oomalama (1992)	Mary Queen of Scots (1994)

Professional ratings
Review scores
Source	Rating
AllMusic	4.5/5 stars
Chicago Tribune	3.5/4 stars
Robert Christgau	(3-star Honorable Mention)
Entertainment Weekly	B+

Oomalama is the debut album by Scottish pop rock band Eugenius, released in 1992. The band had released one single and an EP on Paperhouse Records prior to this album, however, Oomalama was their first release under Atlantic Records.

The album was released when the band members of Eugenius consisted of Eugene Kelly (guitar and vocals), Gordon Keen (guitar), Raymond Boyle (bass) and Roy Lawrence (drums), however, most of the songs were recorded prior to Boyle's and Lawrence's introduction to the band, and therefore these members do not appear much on the album.

The tracks "Bed-In" and "Buttermilk" were released as promotional singles in support of the album, each with accompanying music videos.

== Style ==
Music critic Jim DeRogatis described Oomalama as a “psychedelic mantra.”

== Critical reception ==
Trouser Press wrote: "Calmly applying his Robyn Hitchcocky voice to stellar songs that roll even music (a raucous catchy pop rush somewhere between the Byrds and Stooges) and odd lyrics, Kelly and his three bandmates make a merry mess that is as sensually satisfying as it is delightful."

== Track listing ==
All songs by Eugene Kelly except where noted.

1. "Oomalama" – 3:21
2. "Breakfast" – 3:49
3. "One's Too Many" – 2:31
4. "Bed-In" – 4:30
5. "Hot Dog" (Gordon Keen) – 3:34
6. "Down on Me" (Eugene Kelly, Gordon Keen) – 5:01
7. "Flame On" – 3:37
8. "Here I Go" – 3:07
9. "I'm The Sun" – 3:41
10. "Buttermilk" – 3:22
11. "Bye Bye" – 4:36

=== Bonus tracks ===
12. "Wow!" – 4:07
13. "Wannabee" – 2:42
14. "Indian Summer" (Beat Happening) – 4:16

=== Tireless Wireless: Eugenius Radio Sessions (2003 Bonus disc) ===
1. "Sex Sux (Amen)" (Eugene Kelly, Frances McKee) – 2:39
2. "One's Too Many" – 2:38
3. "Here I Go" – 3:12
4. "Oomalama" – 4:17
5. "Molly's Lips" (Eugene Kelly, Frances McKee) – 2:19
6. "Indian Summer" (Beat Happening) – 3:29

"Wow!", "Bed-In" and "Wannabee" were previously released on Eugenius' debut EP (released when the band was called "Captain America"). The EP also featured a B-Side titled "God Bless Les Paul" which along with a cover of "I Won't Try" by Midway Still was featured as an additional bonus track on the 2003 expanded re-issue. This re-issue also included a companion disc of radio sessions entitled Tireless Wireless, which features various radio sessions from 1992, the same that were featured on the EP It Ain't Rocket Science, It's Eugenius!.

"Flame On", "Buttermilk" and "Indian Summer" were previously released on Eugenius' "Flame On" EP, (also released when the band was called "Captain America").

Tracks 1–4 of Tireless Wireless were recorded for Mark Goodier and the BBC and were first broadcast on 3 August 1992. Tracks 5 and 6 were recorded at WHFS in Baltimore in 1993.

== Personnel ==
- Eugene Kelly – guitar and vocals
- Gordon Keen – guitar
- Raymond Boyle – bass
- James Seenan – bass on track 4, 12 and 13
- Andy Bollen – drums on tracks 1, 7, 10, 12, 13
- Francis MacDonald – drums on remaining tracks
- Duglas T. Stewart – backing vocals on track 1
- Joe McAlinden – backing vocals, string arrangements, bass on tracks 7 and 10
- Lee Paterson – bass on track 5
