= Julie McLarnon =

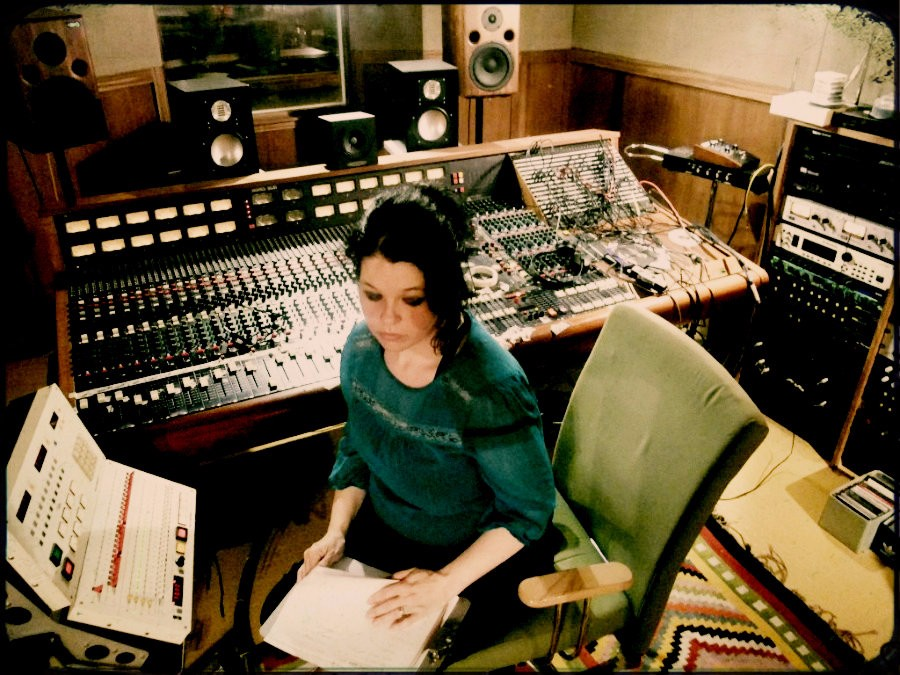
- Julie McLarnon, 2017

Background information
- Born: 31 May 1971 (age 54); Manchester, England
- Website: juliemclarnon.com

Julie McLarnon (born 31 May 1971) is a British recording engineer and record producer, known for working solely to analogue tape. Founder of Analogue Catalogue Studios, she has recorded albums for artists including the Vaselines, Lankum, Jeffrey Lewis, King Creosote, Duke Special and Alasdair Roberts.

== Early life ==
Born in Manchester in 1971 to Irish parents, McLarnon started playing music at an early age, experimenting with 4 track recording and making effects pedals from the age of 14. At 16, she left school having been accepted onto the Recording Technology course at University College Salford run by Bill Leader.

== Career ==
=== Early years ===
Two years into the course she was offered the job of tape op at Strawberry Studios, Stockport where she trained under engineer Chris Nagle, in addition to assisting on sessions with Martin Hannett. As part of her training at Strawberry, McLarnon brought in local band The Charlatans, introducing them to Chris Nagle and assisting on the recording of the band's debut single 'Indian Rope'. Nagle later went on to produce the band's debut album 'Some Friendly'. Following the closure of Strawberry Studios, Julie McLarnon worked at Suite 16 (co-owned by Peter Hook of Joy Division/New Order), Mirage (formerly Pennine Sound Studios) and The Windings Studios in North Wales. These years saw her work with Happy Mondays, New Order, 808 State, James, A Guy Called Gerald, Inspiral Carpets, Napalm Death and World of Twist amongst others.

=== Thrush Puppies and Bridget Storm ===
In addition to her studio work, in the mid-90s McLarnon also fronted riot grrl act Thrush Puppies, who toured extensively, recorded Peel Sessions and signed to 4AD offshoot Detox Artefacts. Following the break up of the band, she subsequently fronted her own project under the name Bridget Storm, signing a publishing deal with Rough Trade and touring with Smog, Lambchop and Daniel Johnston.

=== Record producer and recording engineer ===
Julie McLarnon set up her own Analogue Catalogue Studios in Manchester in the early 2000s, recording to 2" tape using only analogue recording equipment. Built around a vintage Trident Series 80B mixing console and Otari MTR90 24 track 2" tape machine, she produced and engineered albums by artists including The Vaselines, Jeffrey Lewis, Barbarossa and King Creosote. The studio moved to Ireland in 2014 where she continues to work producing albums by artists including Yorkston/Thorne/Khan, Alasdair Roberts and Lankum.

McLarnon has produced, engineered and/or mixed numerous records including:

- Jeffrey Lewis – A Turn in the Dream Songs (Rough Trade, 2011)
- The Vaselines - Sex with an X (Sub Pop, 2010)
- Barbarossa – Bloodlines (Memphis Industries, 2013)
- Yorkston/Thorne/Khan – Navarasa: Nine Emotions (Domino Records, 2020)
- Yorkston/Thorne/Khan – Everything Sacred (Domino Records, 2016)
- Yorkston/Thorne/Khan – Neuk Wight Delhi All Stars (Domino Records, 2017)
- Lankum - Between the Earth and Sky (Rough Trade, 2017)
- Brigid Mae Power - The Two Worlds (Tompkins Square, 2018)
- Brad Gallagher, Bill Lowman & Alasdair Roberts – Missed Flights & Fist Fights (2015)
- Alasdair Roberts – Pangs (Drag City, 2017)
- Ulaid and Duke Special - A Note Let Go (2017)
- King Creosote – Astronaut Meets Appleman (Domino Records, 2016)
- King Creosote – Analogue Catalogue EP (BOER, 2013)
- King Creosote & Jon Hopkins – Honest Words EP (Domino Records, 2011)
- Frances McKee – Sunny Moon (P-Vine, 2006)
- The Shivers – More (Fence/Silence Breaks 2011)
- Aidan Smith – Fancy Barrel (ACat, 2005)
- Supreme Vagabond Craftsman - Just You, Me & the Baby (ACat, 2007)
- Robin James – Paper Earth (Pocket Size, 2011)
- Elaine Palmer – Waves (Cosmos, 2006)
