= Sex with an X =

Studio album by The Vaselines
- Released: 14 September 2010
- Recorded: 2010
- Studio: Analogue Catalogue Studios, Manchester, England
- Genre: Alternative rock; indie rock
- Length: 42:11
- Label: Sub Pop
- Producer: Jamie Watson

The Vaselines chronology
Dum-Dum (1989)	Sex with an X (2010)	V for Vaselines (2014)

Singles from Sex with an X
- 1. "I Hate the 80s" Released: 10 June 2010; 2. "Sex with an X" Released: 24 August 2010; 3. "Mouth to Mouth" Released: 11 February 2011

Professional ratings
Aggregate scores
Source	Rating
Metacritic	65/100
Review scores
Source	Rating
AllMusic	4/5 stars
The A.V. Club	B−
Drowned in Sound	7/10
Mojo	3/5 stars
NME	6/10
Pitchfork	6.9/10
PopMatters	6/10
Spin	7/10 stars
Tiny Mix Tapes	3/5 stars
Uncut	3/5 stars

Sex with an X is the second long-play studio album by the Scottish alternative rock band The Vaselines. Released in September of 2010 on Sub Pop, Sex with an X was the Vaselines’ first new album since the release of Dum-Dum over 20 years earlier.

The first single from the album, "I Hate The 80s" was released on 10 June 2010. The titular second single, "Sex with an X", saw release on 24 August 2010 with the B-side; "Roaster", followed by a third single, "Mouth To Mouth", on Valentine's Day, 2011.

Five days prior to Sex with an X’s official release, The Guardian streamed the entire album on its Music Blog. The album was released with a track by track guide written by The Vaselines.

The record’s final track, "Exit the Vaselines", is a reference to the compilation album, Enter the Vaselines.

== Track listing ==
All tracks written and composed by Eugene Kelly/Frances McKee

1. "Ruined" – 2:11
2. "Sex with an X" – 3:34
3. "The Devil's Inside Me" – 4:34
4. "Such A Fool" – 2:56
5. "Turning It On" – 3:37
6. "Overweight But Over You" – 3:05
7. "Poison Pen" – 4:18
8. "I Hate The 80s" – 3:29
9. "Mouth To Mouth" – 3:35
10. "Whitechapel" – 3:31
11. "My God's Bigger Than Your God" – 2:51
12. "Exit The Vaselines" – 4:36
13. "Picked A Cherry" (iTunes Bonus Track) – 2:54

== Personnel ==
The Vaselines

- Eugene Kelly – Guitar/Vocals
- Frances McKee – Guitar/Vocals
- Stevie Jackson – Guitar
- Bobby Kildea – Bass
- Michael McGaughrin – Drums

Produced by Jamie Watson. Recorded by Julie McLarnon
