= McLarnon =

McLarnon is a surname. Notable people with the surname include:

- Gerard McLarnon (1915–1997), Irish playwright and actor
- Julie McLarnon (born 1971), British recording engineer and record producer
- Mike McLarnon (born 1965), Canadian politician and also max McLarnon a young prodigy golfer also included in family traits such as carrying on the long family tradition of many recognized figures such as political figures, Sports men, many recognized women Such as Julie McLarnon

== See also ==
- McClarnon
