= Secession (band) =

Scottish synthpop band

- Also known as: The Gift
- Origin: Scotland
- Genres: Synth-pop; new wave
- Years active: 1983–1987
- Labels: Siren; Beggars Banquet
- Past members: Peter J. Thomson; Carole L. Branston; Charlie Kelly; J.L. Seenan; Jack Ross; Alistair MacLeod

Secession was a Scottish synth-pop band that was active between 1983 and 1987. The original incarnation comprised Peter Thomson (guitar, keyboards, synthesizer and vocals), Jack Ross (guitar, synthesizer and vocals), Jim Ross (bass guitar) and Carole L. Branston (keyboards and vocals). The band used a small pre-programmed drum machine.

== Career ==
Before being named Secession, the band played at least one concert as the Gift, during which Jim Ross performed with one arm in a full plaster cast following an accident. After a performance at Buster Brown's nightclub in Edinburgh, the band were introduced to Hamish Brown, a local entrepreneur, who offered to manage them. This was followed by the addition of a fifth member, Alistair MacLeod (percussion and vocals), a friend of the original members who had provided the photograph for the sleeve of the band's independently released debut single "Betrayal".

Shortly after recording demo material at Palladium Studios in Edinburgh, Jack Ross, disillusioned with the direction the music was taking, left the band. MacLeod was asked to divide his contribution between percussion and synthesizer/sequencing, and the band continued in this form for a short period of time until Jim Ross left, cutting the line-up to a trio. This was the unit that produced the original demo of "Fire Island" (based around two sequences programmed on a Yamaha DX7) at Planet Studios in Edinburgh, which came to the attention of the Beggars Banquet Records A&R department.

After being signed by Beggars Banquet, the trio re-recorded "Fire Island" at REL Studios in Edinburgh, later remixed by the production team associated with Freeez and John Rocca. Before its release, MacLeod left the band to concentrate on photography, and was replaced by Charlie D. Kelly.

A second single, "Touch," was released that same year on Beggars Banquet. The single did well in Germany, prompting their German label to request a music video from Beggars Banquet. According to Brown, “Beggars refused because they believed it would be successful anyway." Believing the label had cost them a hit, the band successfully sued the label and were released from their album commitment.

The band then signed with label Siren, a sublabel of Virgin Records. Around this time, James Seenan joined the band on bass. This final incarnation of Secession, associated with almost the entire released catalog, consisted of Thomson, Branston, Kelly, and J.L. Seenan. Their singer, Thomson, who penned "Touch (Part 3)", their most commercially successful song, died in 2001. Secession was mainly on two different record labels during their short career, Beggars Banquet and Siren Records. They released a number of singles starting in 1983 until they released A Dark Enchantment, their only studio album, in late 1987.

After Secession broke up, Kelly and Seenan joined the Vaselines with Charlie's brother, Eugene, and Frances McKee.

== Discography ==
Studio album

- 1987: A Dark Enchantment

Singles

- 1983: "Betrayal"
- 1984: "Fire Island"
- 1984: "Touch (Part 3)"
- 1986: "Michael"
- 1987: "The Magician"
- 1987: "Promise"
- 1987: "Radioland"
- 1987: "Sneakyville"
