= Suckle =

Suckle may refer to:

- Suckling, for mammals, during Lactation
  - in human babies, Breastfeeding
- Suckle (band), Scottish indie pop band
- Count Suckle, Jamaica-born sound system operator and club owner
- Richard Suckle, film producer
