= Y'All Get Scared Now, Ya Hear! =

Studio album by The Reindeer Section
- Released: 8 August 2001
- Recorded: Early 2001
- Genre: Indie rock
- Label: Bright Star Recordings
- Producers: Tony Doogan and Gary Lightbody

The Reindeer Section chronology
Y'All Get Scared Now, Ya Hear! (2001)	Son of Evil Reindeer (2002)

Professional ratings
Review scores
Source	Rating
Allmusic	4/5 stars
Pitchfork	(6.4/10)
PlayLouder	3.5/5 stars

Y'All Get Scared Now, Ya Hear! is the debut album by the Scottish indie rock supergroup The Reindeer Section, released on 8 August 2001. The album was recorded over a ten-day period between January and February 2001.

The core band throughout the album consists of vocalist/guitarist Gary Lightbody, drummer Jonny Quinn, guitarist/harmony vocalist William Campbell, acoustic guitarist/harmony vocalist Charles Clark, bassist Gareth Russell, and violinist/vocalist Jenny Reeve with various musicians joining in on a number of tracks - with everyone considered a member in keeping with the collective spirit.

Members of Snow Patrol, Mogwai, Astrid, Belle and Sebastian, Arab Strap and Eva appear on this album.

== Track listing ==
1. "Will You Please Be There for Me" – 1:49
2. "The Opening Taste" – 2:29
3. "12 Hours It Takes Sometimes" – 3:47
4. "Deviance" – 1:53
5. "If There Is I Haven't Found It Yet" – 4:00
6. "Fire Bell" – 1:41
7. "If Everything Fell Quiet" – 2:18
8. "I've Never Understood" – 2:53
9. "Raindrop" – 2:49
10. "Sting" – 4:36
11. "Billed as Single" – 2:30
12. "Tout le Monde" – 4:53
13. "Nightfall" – 2:41
14. "The Day We All Died" – 2:00

== Personnel ==
- Gary Lightbody - lead and harmony vocals, guitars, keyboards (tracks 6, 9, 11, 13) and harmonica (10, 13)
- Jonny Quinn - drums
- Gareth Russell - bass
- Michael Bannister - piano (tracks 3, 7), Hammond organ (12), Wurlitzer (5)
- William Campbell - guitar, harmony vocals (tracks 4, 6, 7, 9, 10, 11, 12, 13), guitar (12)
- Charles Clark - acoustic guitar, harmony vocals (tracks 2, 4, 6, 7, 10, 12, 13)
- Richard Colburn - congas (track 13), timbaleze (12), pigeon noises (14)
- Mick Cooke - trumpet (track 10), flugelhorn (10)
- John Cummings - guitar (tracks 2, 4, 5, 7, 9, 10, 12, 13)
- Roy Kerr - drums (tracks 9, 11, 13)
- Bob Kildea - guitar (tracks 5, 12)
- Colin MacIntyre - harmony vocals (track 9)
- Gill Mills - backing vocals (track 3)
- Aidan Moffat - lead vocals (track 13)
- Jenny Reeve - lead vocals (track 6), backing vocals (5, 8), violin (5)
- Tony Doogan - recording, mixing
- Katie Arup - design, artwork

== Charts ==
Chart performance for Y'All Get Scared Now, Ya Hear!
Chart (2001)	Peak position
Scottish Albums (Official Charts)	39
UK Independent Albums (Official Charts)	19
