= The Shivers (2000s band) =

American musical group

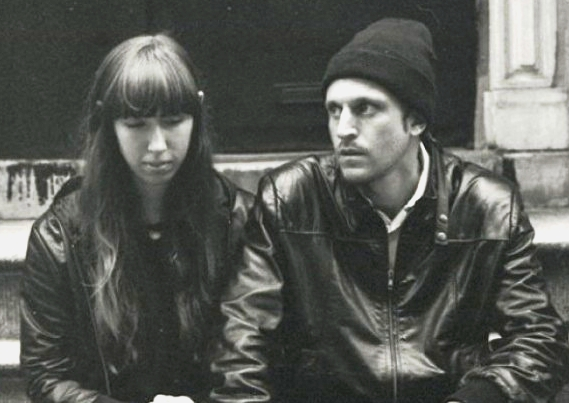
- in NYC

Background information
- Origin: Queens, New York City
- Genre: Rock/Folk/Soul
- Years active: 2001–present
- Label: Independent
- Members: Keith Zarriello
- Past members: Joanne Schornikow

The Shivers is a musical group formed in 2001 in New York City, led by singer, primary songwriter and only consistent member Keith Zarriello. To date, the only other regular member of the band was Joanne Schornikow, who played keyboards and sang in the band at most performances between 2009 and 2012.

== History ==
The Shivers' first record, The Shakes, was recorded at Context Studios in Brooklyn. It was released independently and sold at shows, and is now out of print. Shortly thereafter, Erdos left the band, and Zarriello was left to continue on alone playing New York City clubs for the next few years, both solo and with a revolving cast of musicians.

In 2004, Zarriello was spotted by touring musician Red Hunter, who offered to take him on the road and release an album on his label/collective, Whiskey and Apples. The album, CHARADES, released in October 2004 (produced by Zarriello and Brian "Boots" Factor) received little critical attention but began to develop The Shivers a following. The track "Beauty" has gone on, in subsequent years, to receive good reviews on sites such as Pitchfork, who said Zarriello's voice carried a "mesmerizing eroticism", and was a subject of a column in The Guardian and Spin.

While Zarriello was living in Montreal, Quebec, Canada, he was contacted by a former high school classmate, Sheldon Roberts, who had discovered The Shivers' music through a friend and proposed releasing their next album on a label he and friends were forming, Outerborough Records. Zarriello agreed and took measures to return to the United States.

=== Five-piece band: 2004–2008 ===
Back in New York City, Zarriello started performing again and sending CHARADES to college radio stations around the country. At one station, Fordham University's WFUV, the album was discovered in the garbage can by young intern/DJ, Benham Jones, who reached out to Zarriello at a Tuesday night show at Arlene's Grocery. He offered Zarriello a gig at Fordham and the two became friends. Zarriello, now having his deal with Outerborough, gathered musicians and reached out to Jones to play bass. Jones agreed and helped the band record the album secretly overnight in the studios of WFUV. The album featured William Martina on cello, Matthew Jahn on guitar, Benham Jones on bass, and Alex Saltz and Danny Fischer on drums. Also featured on one track was visiting Australian pianist, Joanne Schornikow.

The album, Phone Calls, released in early 2006. The Shivers continued as a five-piece, including Schornikow on piano and new drummer, Evan Pazner on drums. Schornikow, having an expiring visa, was forced to return to Australia. She was, however, sold on The Shivers, and begun plans to return to the US on an artist's visa with the primary goal of joining The Shivers. Zarriello and Schornikow kept in touch via the mail, sending each other packages and tapes. The five-piece band played the SXSW music festival in 2007.

In 2008, Zarriello decided to fund the production of the next Shivers album himself. Using money he had earned as a real estate agent, Zarriello hooked up with engineer Dan Hewitt and the band recorded the album Beaks To The Moon in four days at the now defunct LoHo Studios on the Lower East Side of Manhattan. The album was released by the band via their own label in April 2008. Once again, the critics largely ignored the release with the growing independent critics/blogs, like Quiet Color championing it.

=== As a duo: 2008–2012 ===
Frustrated by a lack of commercial success and what he felt was an unacceptable level of commitment to the band, Zarriello dismissed all the band members except Schornikow, and the two continued as a duo. The Shivers had been in talks with Hewitt about releasing a DIY record on his micro-indie, State Capital Records. The label and the band would split all costs and profits. The album, In The Morning, was recorded on a 4-track tape recorder. It was the rawest, most analog/DIY album The Shivers had made since CHARADES and featured a more experimental duo sound. Again it did very little commercially and was primarily used as something to sell while on tour. The Shivers bought out Hewitt and now solely own the record.

The Shivers continued on as a duo doing national tours and short stints overseas, and decided to independently record an album. The band used their own funds from day jobs and donations from their following decided to record their next album at all analog studio, Analogue Catalogue outside of Manchester, England.

The album, More, was recorded by Producer Julie McLarnon and assisted by Rob Ferrier in five days to 2" inch tape. No computers were used. Tom Raysmith played drums. Semay Wu played cello and Jon Thorne played bass. Andrew Southern (bass) and Ryan Thornton (drums) were the rhythm section on the track "Love Is In The Air". The album was released in May 2011 on Silence Breaks Records (US). It was the most regularly released album The Shivers had to that time, and the first that included a proper public relations campaign. The album gained them some further recognition and a wider audience.

Musician and label owner Johnny Lynch The Pictish Trail from Scotland had discovered In The Morning and decided to release More on his Fence Records in the UK in September 2011. The Shivers subsequently toured the UK in late fall of 2011 including performing a sold-out show in London and recording a session for the BBC Radio 1's Rob Da Bank show at Maida Vale Studios. Schornikow has also continued her own career alongside her work with the band, and undertook a small club tour of the U.K with New Yorker Scott Rudd in the summer of 2012.

=== Forever Is A Word: 2015–present ===
The Shivers latest album Forever Is A Word was self-released on February 14, 2015. The band is currently working on a new full-length album and playing shows around New York City.

== In popular culture ==
In May 2013, the song "Beauty" was sung by wedding guests at actor Aaron Paul's wedding. The band is featured in Matthew Bonifacio's film The Quitter. The Shivers music appears in other films such as Short Term 12, The Benefactor and Horns.

== Discography ==
- "The Shakes" – self-released (2001)
- CHARADES – self-released (2004)
- Phone Calls – Outerborough Records (2006)
- Beaks To The Moon – self-released (2008)
- In The Morning – State Capital Records (2009)
- More – Silence Breaks Records (US) / Fence Records (UK) (2011)
- Moon Casale – Moonrise Records (2013)
- Forever Is A Word – self-released (2015)
- Grey Romantic – self-released (2017)
- I'm On Your Side – self-released (2019)
