= McClarnon =

McClarnon is a surname. Notable people with the surname include:

- Liz McClarnon (born 1981), English singer and television presenter
- Zahn McClarnon (born 1966), American actor

== See also ==
- McLarnon
