= Son of Evil Reindeer =

Studio album by The Reindeer Section
- Released: 24 June 2002
- Recorded: February 2002
- Studio: Cava Studios, Glasgow
- Genre: Indie rock
- Length: 40:48
- Label: Bright Star Recordings
- Producer: Tony Doogan and Gary Lightbody

The Reindeer Section chronology
Y'All Get Scared Now, Ya Hear! (2001)	Son of Evil Reindeer (2002)

Singles from Son of Evil Reindeer
- 1. "You Are My Joy" Released: 2002

Professional ratings
Review scores
Source	Rating
AllMusic	3/5 stars
Entertainment.ie	4/5 stars
The Japan Times	(favorable)
Kevchino	8/10
Pitchfork	6.6/10
PlayLouder	3.5/5 stars
Rolling Stone	4/5 stars
RTÉ Entertainment	4/5 stars

Son of Evil Reindeer is the second studio album by Scottish indie rock supergroup The Reindeer Section, released on 24 June 2002. It was recorded in February that year. An alternate version was released in Japan. It contained 3 bonus tracks.

Gary Lightbody had finished writing the songs of the album by January 2002. In 2004, Snow Patrol recorded a live version of "You Are My Joy" at Somerset House on 8 August 2004 for their live DVD, Live at Somerset House. This live rendition also appeared as a B-side on their "How to Be Dead" single and was later included on their 2009 compilation album Up to Now.

== Track listing ==
#	Title	Writer(s)	Time
1	"Grand Parade"	Iain Archer, Norman Blake, William Campbell, Charles Clark, Richard Colburn, Mick Cooke, Ben Dumville, Gary Lightbody, Colin Macpherson, Mark McClelland, Malcolm Middleton, Neil Payne, Jonny Quinn, Jenny Reeve, Sarah Robertson, Gareth Russell, Stacey Sievwright	3:16
2	"Budapest"	William Campbell, Charles Clark, Ben Dumville, Bob Kildea, Gary Lightbody, Colin Macpherson, Sam Morris, Neil Payne, Jonny Quinn, Jenny Reeve, Gareth Russell, Stacey Sievwright	3:25
3	"Strike Me Down"	Norman Blake, William Campbell, Charles Clark, Eugene Kelly, Gary Lightbody, Neil Payne, Jenny Reeve, Gareth Russell	2:52
4	"Your Sweet Voice"	Iain Archer, William Campbell, Charles Clark, Gary Lightbody, Colin Macpherson, Malcolm Middleton, Jonny Quinn, Jenny Reeve, Gareth Russell, Stacey Sievwright	4:46
5	"I'll Be Here When You Wake"	Iain Archer, Paul Fox, Bob Kildea, Gary Lightbody, Colin Macpherson, Jonny Quinn, Jenny Reeve, Gareth Russell	3:10
6	"Where I Fall"	Gary Lightbody	3:05
7	"Cartwheels"	Iain Archer, William Campbell, Charles Clark, Bob Kildea, Gary Lightbody, Colin Macpherson, Neil Payne, Jonny Quinn, Jenny Reeve, Gareth Russell	4:07
8	"Last Song on Blue Tape"	William Campbell, Charles Clark, Richard Colburn, Mick Cooke, John Cummings, Ben Dumville, Lee Gorton, Gary Lightbody, Neil Payne, Jonny Quinn, Jenny Reeve, Sarah Robertson, Gareth Russell	2:35
9	"Cold Water"	William Campbell, Charles Clark, Ben Dumville, Gary Lightbody, Sam Morris, Jonny Quinn, Jenny Reeve, Gareth Russell, Stacey Sievwright	3:08
10	"You Are My Joy"	Iain Archer, William Campbell, Charles Clark, Mick Cooke, Ben Dumville, Bob Kildea, Gary Lightbody, Colin Macpherson, Neil Payne, Jonny Quinn, Jenny Reeve, Gareth Russell, Stacey Sievwright	3:45
11	"Who Told You"	Iain Archer, Gary Lightbody, Marcus Mackay, Colin Macpherson, Mark McClelland, Roddy Woomble	3:10
12	"Whodunnit?"	William Campbell, Charles Clark, Gary Lightbody, Colin Macpherson, Aidan Moffat, Neil Payne, Gareth Russell	3:25

=== Bonus tracks on Japanese edition ===
#	Title	Writer(s)	Time
12	"Your Small Beauty" (Demo)	The Reindeer Section	4:19
13	"Guidance Missile" (Demo)	The Reindeer Section	2:04
14	"The Last Line of Defence"	The Reindeer Section	10:43

== Personnel ==
- Gary Lightbody – vocals, acoustic guitar, korg synthesizer
- Aidan Moffat – vocals
- Lee Gorton – vocals
- Eugene Kelly – vocals
- Charlie Clarke – acoustic guitar, background vocals
- Willie Campbell – electric guitar, background vocals
- John Cummings – guitar
- Bob Kildea – guitar
- Malcolm Middleton – guitar
- Iain Archer – lap steel guitar
- Jenny Reeve – violin, background vocals
- Stacy Sievewright – cello
- Colin Macpherson – piano, fender Rhodes piano, Hammond b-3 organ
- Gareth Russell – bass
- Mark McClelland – moog
- Jonny Quinn – drums
- Marcus Mackay – programming
- Gill Mills – background vocals
