= Eugene Kelly =

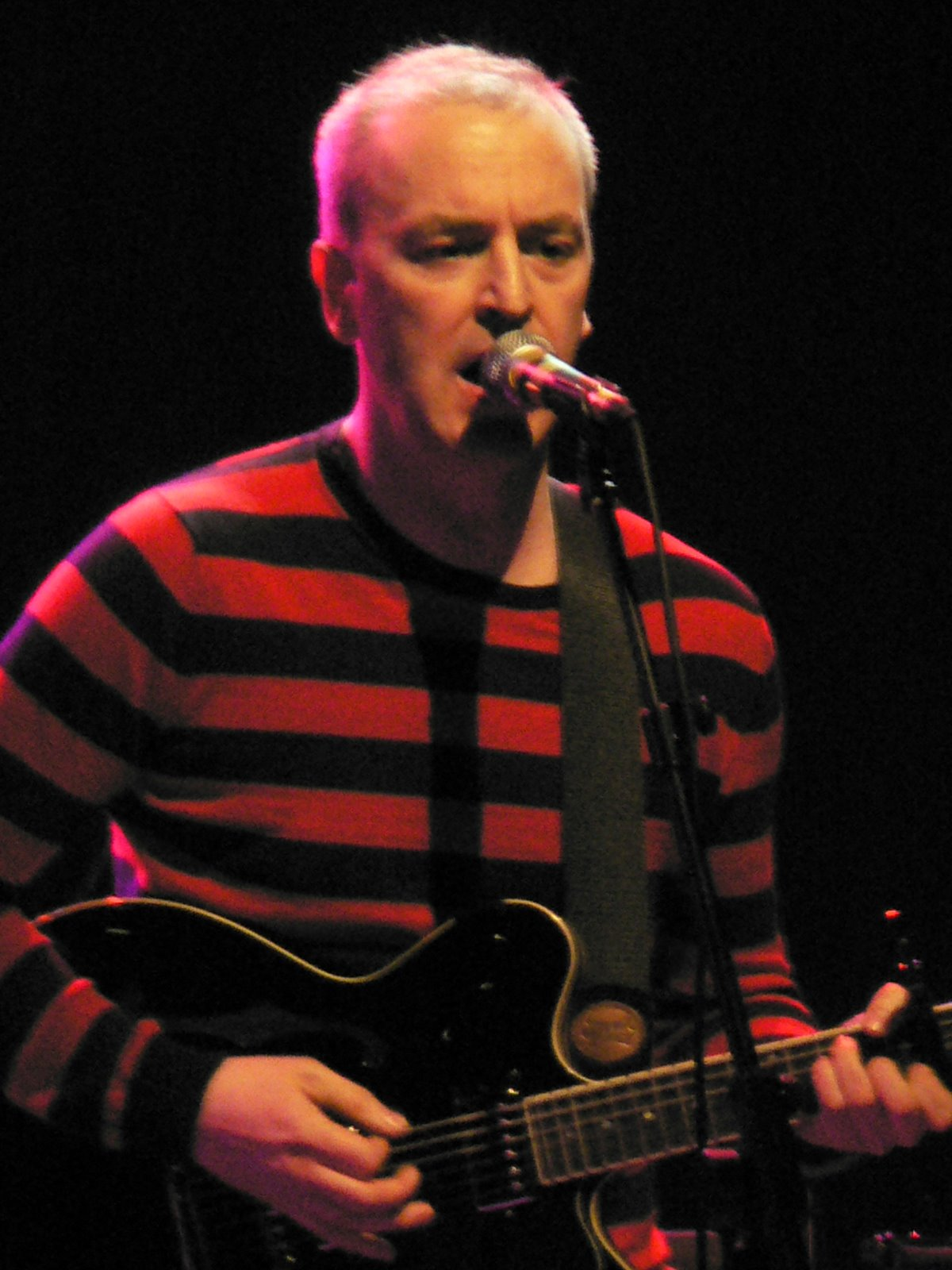

Background information
- Born: 20 January 1965 (age 61); Calton, Glasgow
- Origin: Parkhead, Glasgow, Scotland
- Genres: Alternative rock, indie pop
- Instruments: Guitar, vocals
- Years active: 1985–present
- Member of: The Vaselines
- Formerly of: The Famous Monsters; BMX Bandits; Astro Chimp; Eugenius; The Reindeer Section; The Pastels

Eugene Kelly (born 20 January 1965) is a Scottish musician who is a member of the group The Vaselines, a founding member of the now disbanded Eugenius and has had a number of solo releases.

Eugene Kelly formed The Vaselines in Glasgow, Scotland in 1986 with Frances McKee and was a member until 1989 when the band disbanded the week their first and only full-length album, Dum-Dum, was released. Kurt Cobain of Nirvana was a big fan of the band, covering three of their songs. Molly's Lips and Son Of A Gun were included on their album, Incesticide. Nirvana also covered The Vaselines song Jesus Doesn't Want Me for a Sunbeam on their album, MTV Unplugged in New York.

In 1990, Kelly formed Captain America but was forced to change the name after Marvel Comics, who owned the trademark of the superhero name, threatened them with legal action. The band then became known as Eugenius. He has had a number of collaborations with Evan Dando of The Lemonheads and in 2003 Eugene released a solo album, Man Alive. In 1990 Kelly was reunited with McKee as the Vaselines to support Nirvana in a one-off gig at Edinburgh.

In 2006, he toured with Isobel Campbell, replacing Mark Lanegan when performing songs from Ballad of the Broken Seas and supporting Mogwai and The Lemonheads in Europe.

In the summer of 2006, Eugene Kelly and Frances McKee took to the stage to perform a set of The Vaselines songs, as part of a joint tour to promote their individual solo albums. This led to The Vaselines reforming (minus the old rhythm section) on 24 April 2008 for a charity show for the Malawi Orphan Support group at Glasgow's MONO venue.

Since 2008, The Vaselines have continued to perform around the world, with members of Belle & Sebastian supporting their live set. On 5 May 2009, Sub Pop released Enter the Vaselines. A deluxe-edition reissue of the 1992 Sub Pop release, it includes remastered versions of the band’s two EPs, album, as well as demos and live recordings from 1986 and 1988.

Kelly features prominently in the 2017 documentary Teenage Superstars, which covers the formation of The Vaselines, their influence on Nirvana and Eugenius.

== Releases ==
- with The Pastels
  - Comin' Through EP (1987 Glass House Records)
  - Comin' Through / Sit On It Mother single (1987 Glass Records, Ltd.)
  - Sittin' Pretty (1989 Homestead)
- The Vaselines
  - Son of a Gun EP (1987 53rd & 3rd)
  - Dying for It EP (1988 53rd & 3rd)
  - Dum-Dum (1989 Rough Trade)
  - The Vaselines / Beat Happening (1991 K Records - recorded live in London June 16, 1988)
  - The Way of the Vaselines: A Complete History (1992 Sub Pop)
  - All the Stuff and More... (1992 Avalanche)
  - Enter the Vaselines (2009 Sub Pop)
  - Sex with an X (2010 Sub Pop)
  - V for Vaselines (2014 Rosary Music)
- with the BMX Bandits
  - Star Wars (1991 Vinyl Japan)
- Captain America
  - Wow! / Bed-In / Wannabee / God Bless Les Paul EP (1991 Paperhouse Records)
  - Flame On EP (1992 Paperhouse Records)
- Eugenius
  - Oomalama (1992 Fire/Atlantic)
  - It Ain't Rocket Science, It's Eugenius (1992 Fire Records)
  - Easter Bunny EP (1993 Creation Records)
  - Caesar's Vein EP (1993 Creation Records)
  - Mary Queen of Scots (1994 Creation Records)
  - Womb Boy Returns EP (1996 Human Condition Records)
  - Oomalama/Tireless Wireless re-issue (2003 Fire Records)
- The Famous Monsters
  - In The Summertime EP (1995 Fire Records)
- with Future Pilot A.K.A.
  - Tiny Waves, Mighty Sea (2001 Geographic) (lead vocals on "Beat of a Drum")
- Godstar
  - Glasgow EP (Rugger Bugger Discs)
- Astro Chimp
  - Draggin' / She's My Summer Girl single (1996 Shoeshine Records)
- The Reindeer Section
  - Son of Evil Reindeer (2002 Bright Star Recordings)
- Solo
  - Man Alive (2003 P-Vine Records / 2005 Sympathy)
  - Older Faster EP (2003 Geographic)
