= Count Your Blessings (hymn) =

Christian hymn by Johnson Oatman, Jr

- by Johnson Oatman
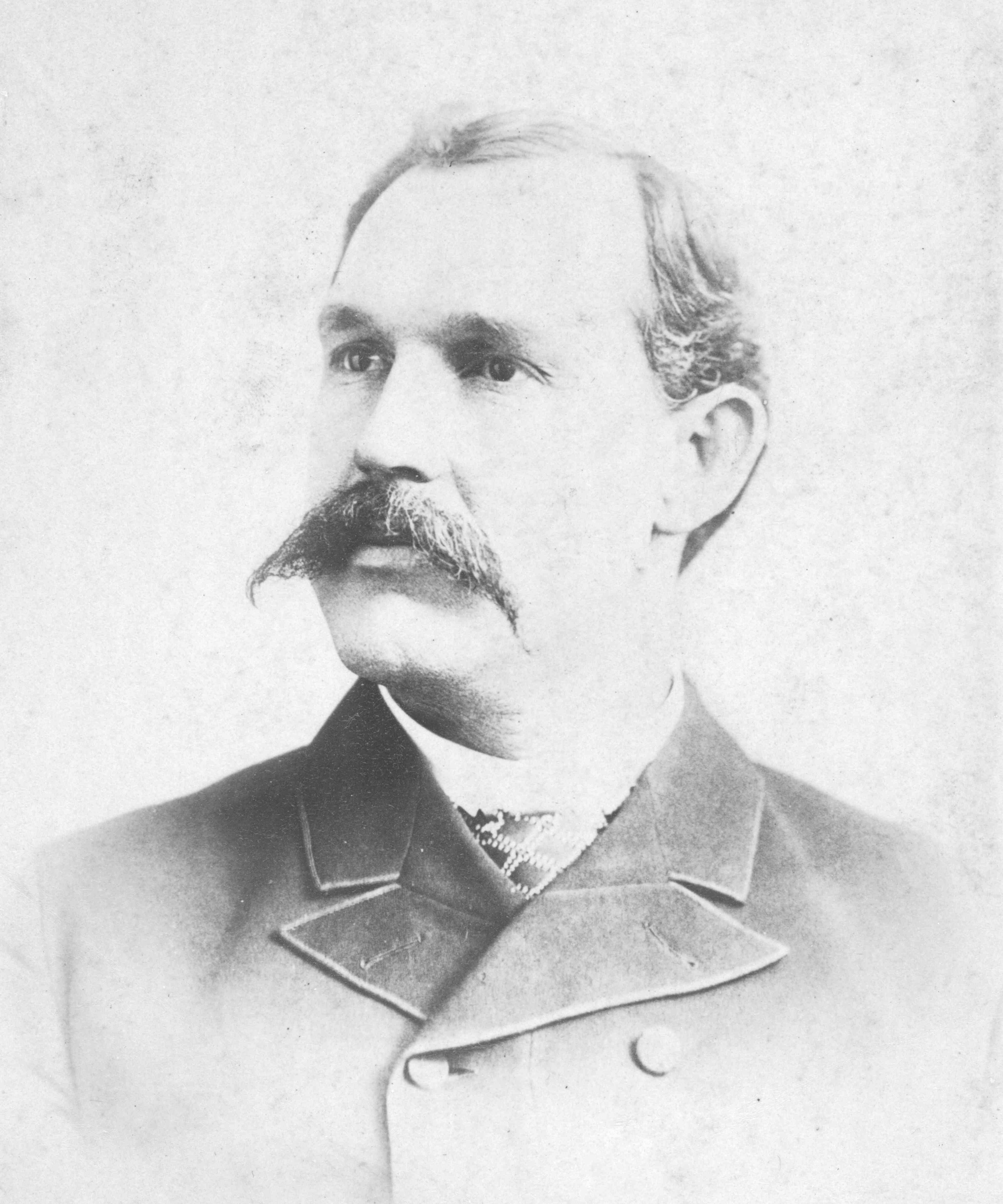
- E. O. Excell
- Genre: Hymn
- Written: 1897
- Meter: 11.11.11.11 with refrain
- Melody: "Blessings" by E. O. Excell

"Count Your Blessings" is a hymn composed in 1897 by Johnson Oatman, Jr., with the tune being written by Edwin O. Excell. It is a standard part of many hymnals, and is well known in Christian circles.
