= Daniel B. Towner =

American composer

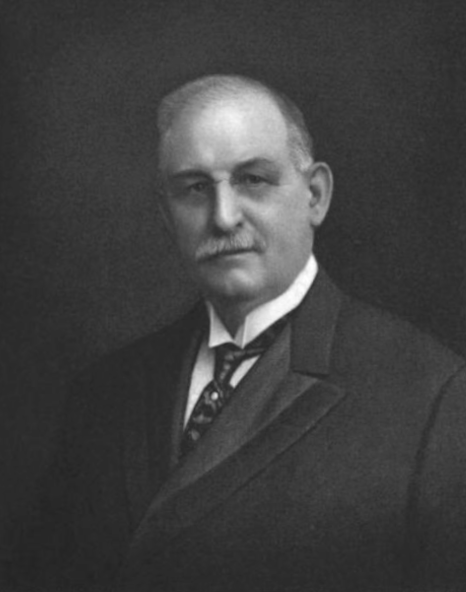
- Born: Daniel Brink Towner; March 5, 1850; Rome, Pennsylvania
- Died: October 3, 1919 (aged 69); Longwood, Missouri
- Burial place: Rosehill Cemetery
- Occupation: Composer

Daniel Brink Towner (March 5, 1850 – October 3, 1919) was an American church music director, college professor, and composer of over 2,000 hymns and gospel songs, many of which are still popular today, the most notable being "Trust and Obey". He was also associated with other great evangelicals of the late 19th century, including evangelist Dwight L. Moody and songwriter Philip P. Bliss.

== Younger Years ==
Born in Rome, Pennsylvania, Towner was the second child and oldest son of "Professor" J. G. Towner, a teacher and director of singing schools in the Rome area; two younger brothers came along later. When he was seven years old, he had his first introduction to Philip P. Bliss, when Bliss came to teach at the school he attended, Rome Academy. His musical talents were recognized by his father early in life; in fact, when J. G. realized how well his son could sing, he was moved to tears, calling him "The Prince of Singers". When "Professor" Towner taught at various singing schools, he would often take Daniel along with him; by the age of 17, he became known as the "Wonderful Boy Bass". He went on to study at the Susquehanna Collegiate Institute in Towanda, Pennsylvania, where Philip P. Bliss also attended.

== Musical career ==
After marrying Mary E. McGonigle in December 1870, he and his wife moved to Binghamton, New York, where he served as the music director at Centenary Methodist Church (1870-1882); from there they went to Cincinnati, Ohio, to serve in a similar capacity at the York Street Methodist Episcopal Church (1882-1884). Their next stop was Covington, Kentucky, where, again, he headed up the music program at the Union Methodist Episcopal Church (1884-1885); it was there that he met Dwight L. Moody for the first time when the evangelist came to town for meetings.

For those services he trained and led a choir of a thousand voices, which was the largest that Mr. Moody had had up until that time. That led to his becoming the director of the Moody Bible Institute’s (MBI) music department; MBI had the distinction of being the first permanent continuing institution in the United States to offer a course of study that was designed to educate students in church music leadership, offering it just three years after it was founded. He was also hired as the choir leader at the Moody Church, where he remained until 1916; he stayed on at MBI until 1919, serving in a dual capacity for a total of 26 years. During that same time, he traveled with a number of evangelists, visiting parts of England, Scotland, and Europe. He was awarded the Doctor of Music degree in 1900 by the American Temperance University in Harriman, Tennessee.

== Death ==
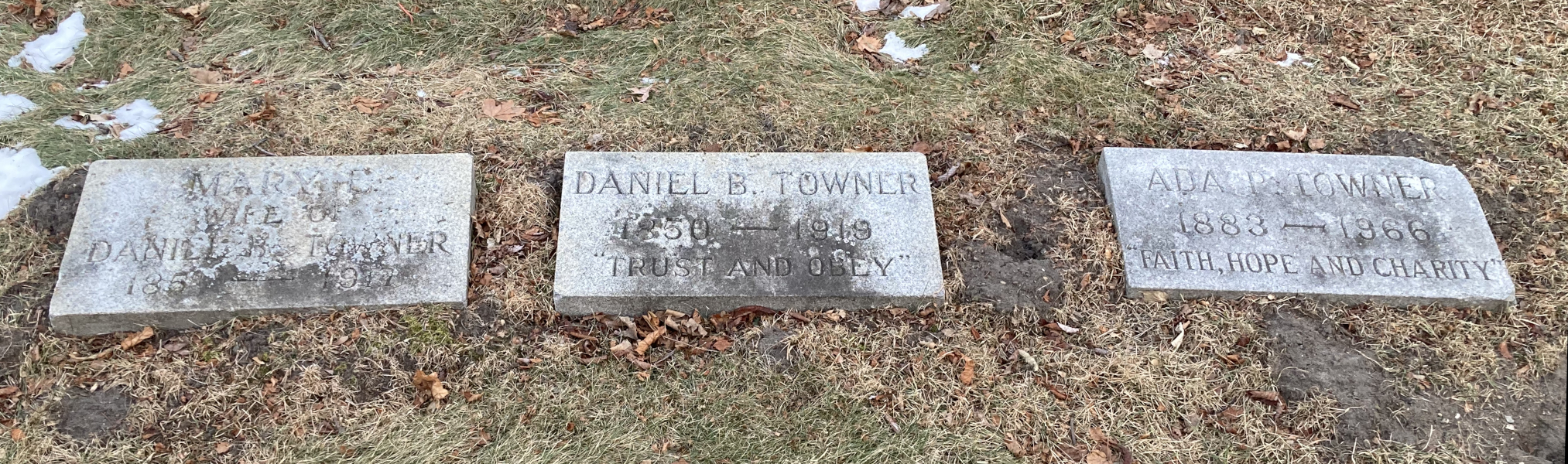
Towner's grave at Rosehill Cemetery

On October 3, 1919, Dr. Towner was assisting in some evangelistic meetings in Longwood, Missouri. That evening he had led both choir and congregation in singing a number of great gospel songs, some that were his own and some written by others. When the time came for him to sing a solo, he chose one of his favorites, “Would You Believe?”, but as he began, he felt ill and tried to go on, but lost consciousness and slumped to the stage. Moved to a nearby hotel, he died a few hours later, the victim of acute kidney failure.

A year later they held a memorial service for him at the Moody Bible Institute auditorium, with Dr. James Gray, Edmund S. Lorenz, George C. Stebbins, E. O. Excell, Charles H. Gabriel, and Peter P. Bilhorn participating. A bronze memorial tablet in his honor was unveiled and dedicated, with the following words: “This tablet is dedicated by members of his choir of the Moody Church, and is erected in this place of hallowed associations where for many years they met from week to week in Christian fellowship to sing the gospel and where the influence of his devoted life and genial personality touched their lives and helped them to be better men and women.” A similar bronze plaque was also placed in the halls of Moody Bible Institute.

== His works ==
Dr. Towner wrote more than 2,000 hymns and anthems and edited 23 different hymnals. One of his best-known songs, “Trust and Obey”, almost didn't get published. It was inspired by a young man who stood up in a testimony meeting, declaring, "I am not quite sure - but I am going to trust, and I am going to obey." Towner jotted those words down, then sent them on to J. H. Sammis, a Presbyterian minister, who wrote a poem based on it; he in turn passed it back to him to compose a melody. Discouraged in his efforts to find one, he crumpled up the paper he was writing on and threw it into the wastebasket. The next morning, as his wife was tidying up his office, she came across the manuscript and sang the words and melody to herself; leaving it on the organ, she encouraged him to work on it again, telling him, "I feel the melody you have written is just what is needed to carry the message."

Other memorable songs which Towner wrote that are still sung today are:

- “Anywhere with Jesus”
- “At Calvary”
- “My Anchor Holds”
- "Only a Sinner”
- “Saved by the Blood”
