= Eugenius (band) =

Scottish indie rock band (1990–1998)

- Also known as: Captain America
- Origin: Glasgow, Scotland
- Genres: Indie rock, alternative rock
- Years active: 1990–1998
- Labels: Paperhouse, Creation, Atlantic
- Members: Eugene Kelly; Gordon Keen; Raymond Boyle; Roy Lawrence; Andy Bollen; James Seenan

Eugenius (formerly known as Captain America) was an indie rock band from Glasgow, Scotland that existed from 1990 to 1998, centred on former Vaselines singer/guitarist Eugene Kelly and featuring members of BMX Bandits and Teenage Fanclub.

== History ==
Captain America was formed in 1990 by Eugene Kelly following the dissolution of his former band, The Vaselines. In the year following the split, Kelly worked as a bartender, where he witnessed early gigs by Teenage Fanclub. This inspired him to form a new band. The initial line-up as Captain America was Eugene Kelly (guitar and vocals), Gordon Keen (of BMX Bandits, guitar), James Seenan (bass), and Andy Bollen (drums), who replaced guest live drummer Brendan O'Hare of Teenage Fanclub. The line-up later changed, as the name changed to Eugenius with Seenan leaving to be replaced by Raymond Boyle, and Roy Lawrence replacing Bollen. Joe McAlinden also contributed bass and violin, and Francis MacDonald drums on the recording of Oomalama. This record was recorded as Captain America but released as Eugenius.

As Kurt Cobain was a big fan of Kelly's work with The Vaselines, Nirvana invited Eugenius to open dates on their 1991 European Tour. Kelly also joined Nirvana on stage during their 1991 Reading Festival performance, with Nirvana's Krist Novoselic later saying "My favourite part came when Eugene Kelly from The Vaselines came on stage. Eugene's just so cool - he can turn weed into marijuana, sugar into cocaine and diet pills into amphetamines". Kelly said of the Nirvana link, "They also liked Captain America and they just happened to be in a position to help us out, so they did by giving us a bit of promotion whenever they could".

In November 1991 the band released their first EP under the name "Captain America", called EP on British independent label Paperhouse, then in 1992 they released their second EP, Flame On, on the same label. The band were forced to change their name due to legal threats from Marvel Comics, who owned the legal rights to the name "Captain America". They decided on Eugenius, which had been Kelly's longtime nickname. Flame On also landed the band in legal trouble, due to the use of the C&A clothing chain's logo on the sleeve even after it was re-released under their new name.

With Cobain campaigning on their behalf, Eugenius attracted the attention of Atlantic Records' A&R man Steve Greenberg and the band was subsequently signed to the major label. In 1992, after delays due to the legal situation surrounding their band name, they released their first album, Oomalama, which received highly favourable reviews.

In 1993, Eugenius released three EPs, Caesar's Vein, Easter Bunny and the six-song live EP from the bands Mark Goodier BBC Session in August 1992; It Ain't Rocket Science, It's Eugenius!. January 1994 saw the release of the band's second full-length album, Mary Queen of Scots, but once again they were unable to extend their audience to a significant extent. The song "Blue Above The Rooftops" (from Mary Queen of Scots) was a moderate hit for the group in 1994 on the Alternative charts.

Following the limited success of Mary Queen of Scots, Eugenius was dropped by Atlantic Records and then recorded an EP entitled Womb Boy Returns for Human Condition Records which was released in 1996. In 1998, Kelly disbanded Eugenius, later re-emerging as a solo artist with Man Alive, released in 2003.

The band features in the book Postcards from Scotland detailing the 1980s and 1990s independent music scene in Scotland.

== Discography ==
=== Singles/EPs ===
- "Wow" (1991) Paperhouse (as Captain America) [Captain America EP]
- "Flame On" (1992) Paperhouse (released under both Captain America and Eugenius)
- "It Ain't Rocket Science, It's Eugenius" (1992) Atlantic (also released as "Tireless Wireless")
- "Caesar's Vein" (1993) Creation/Atlantic
- "Easter Bunny" (1993) Creation/Atlantic
- "Blue Above the Rooftops" (1994) Creation/Atlantic
- "Womb Boy Returns" (1996) Human Condition

=== Albums ===
- Oomalama (1992) Paperhouse/Atlantic
- Mary Queen of Scots (1994) Creation/Atlantic
