= V for Vaselines =

Studio album by the Vaselines
- Released: 29 September 2014
- Recorded: 2013–2014, Castle of Doom Studios, Glasgow
- Genres: Alternative rock, indie rock, punk rock
- Length: 33:00
- Label: Rosary Music
- Producers: The Vaselines and Tony Doogan

The Vaselines chronology
Sex with an X (2010)	V for Vaselines (2014)

Singles from V for Vaselines
- 1. "One Lost Year" Released: 28 May 2014; 2. "High Tide Low Tide" Released: 22 September 2014; 3. "Crazy Lady" Released: 14 November 2014

V for Vaselines is the third studio album by the Scottish alternative rock band the Vaselines. It was recorded at Castle of Doom studios in Glasgow and was released in the UK on 29 September 2014 and in the US on 7 October 2014 through The Vaselines' own label, Rosary Music.

The album's sound was partially inspired by the Ramones, after Eugene Kelly went to see a Ramones cover band in Glasgow. Kelly stated that they wanted to "write some really short punk rock songs, just get into people’s ear really straight away, and then get out of there really quickly." McKee was also surrounded by punk music, as her children were discovering the Ramones and The Stooges at the time the album was being made

The first single from the album, "One Lost Year" was released online on 28 May 2014 along with the announcement of the album. It was made available to download for free from the band's SoundCloud page. A second single followed in August, "High Tide Low Tide", which was released as a download and on limited edition blue vinyl, accompanied by the non-album B-side "Cardinal Sin". A music video for third single, "Crazy Lazy", was released in November. The band toured in support of the album with shows in the US and Europe into 2015.

The album's lyrics were inspired by many current events including the death of Margaret Thatcher, the Leveson Inquiry and the popularity of MP3 downloads. The Vaselines have also noted that a seriousness and sense of maturity has developed slightly in their lyrics.

Professional ratings
Aggregate scores
Source	Rating
Metacritic	68/100
Review scores
Source	Rating
AllMusic	3/5 stars
Drowned in Sound	(6/10)
Exclaim!	(5/10)
The Line of Best Fit	(7/10)
NME	(6/10)
Paste	(7.7/10)
Pitchfork	(7.3/10)

== Track listing ==
All tracks written and composed by Eugene Kelly/Frances McKee

1. "High Tide Low Tide" – 3:36
2. "The Lonely LP" – 3:37
3. "Inky Lies" – 3:14
4. "Crazy Lady" – 2:50
5. "Single Spies" – 4:22
6. "One Lost Year" – 3:30
7. "Earth Is Speeding" – 2:38
8. "False Heaven" – 3:52
9. "Number One Crush" – 2:22
10. "Last Half Hour" – 3:54
11. "Devil Moon" (iTunes Bonus Track) – 2:55
12. "Messy Reflection" (iTunes Bonus Track) – 3:02

== Personnel ==
The Vaselines

- Eugene Kelly – guitar, vocals
- Frances McKee – guitar, vocals, keyboards on "The Lonely L.P." and "Inky Lies"
- Michael McGaughrin – drums
- Graeme Smillie – bass guitar
- Francis MacDonald – piano on "Inky Lies", electric piano on "Single Spies"
- Paul Foley - guitar on "High Tide Low Tide", "Earth Is Speeding" and "False Heaven"
- Scott Paterson - guitar on "One Lost Year" and "Earth Is Speeding"
- Stevie Jackson – guitar on "High Tide Low Tide" and "False Heaven"
