= Mary Queen of Scots (album) =

Studio album by Eugenius
- Released: 13 January 1994
- Recorded: 1993, Britannia Row Studios and Chipping Norton Recording Studios
- Genre: Alternative rock
- Length: 51:20
- Label: Atlantic, August Records
- Producer: Craig Leon

Eugenius chronology
Oomalama (1992)	Mary Queen of Scots (1994)	Womb Boy Returns EP (1996)

Professional ratings
Review scores
Source	Rating
AllMusic	3/5 stars
Robert Christgau	(neither)
The Encyclopedia of Popular Music	3/5 stars

Mary Queen of Scots is the second and final album by Eugenius, released in 1994.

Several songs on the album were released on singles in 1993. The title track was featured as a B-side to the non-LP single "Caesar's Vein", with "Easter Bunny" being released as the follow-up single. The track "Blue Above the Rooftops" was released as a single to support the album in 1994. The track "Home Sick" is only featured on the American release of the album and elsewhere was used as a B-side. The B-side "Green Bed" from the "Caesar's Vein" EP also likely comes from the album sessions.

== Critical reception ==
Dave Thompson, in Alternative Rock, called the album "stronger, more focussed, certainly brighter and cleaner" than the debut.

== Track listing ==
All songs written by Eugene Kelly.

1. "Pebble/Shoe" - 3:23
2. "On the Breeze" - 3:15
3. "Blue Above the Rooftops" - 3:00
4. "The Moon's a Balloon" - 4:53
5. "Mary Queen of Scots" - 4:59
6. "Easter Bunny" - 5:27
7. "Let's Hibernate" - 3:40
8. "Friendly High" - 4:48
9. "River Clyde Song" - 3:10
10. "Tongue Rock" - 2:38
11. "Home Sick" (extra track on US Edition) - 4:34
12. "Fake Digit" - 4:17
13. "Love, Bread and Beers" - 3:07

== Personnel ==
- Eugene Kelly - vocals, guitar
- Gordon Keen - guitar
- Raymond Boyle - bass
- Roy Lawrence - drums
- Cassell Webb - additional keyboards and backing vocals
