= E. O. Excell =

American publisher & hymn composer (1851-1921)

Prof. E. O. Excell
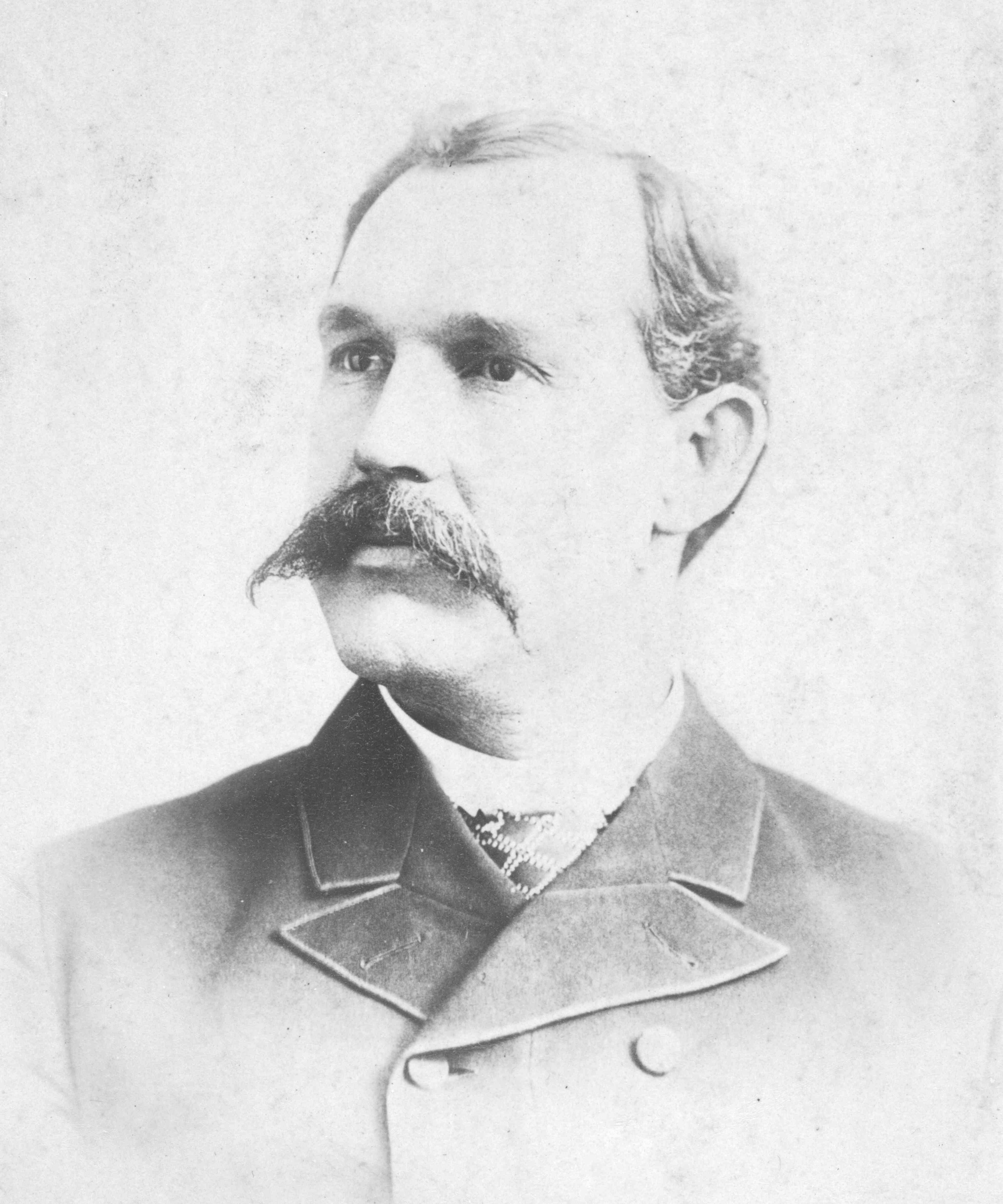
- by Collins of New York, circa 1890
- Born: December 13, 1851; Uniontown, Ohio, US
- Died: June 10, 1921 (aged 69); Wesley Hospital, Chicago, Illinois, US
- Resting place: Oak Woods Cemetery, Chicago
- Education: Studied music under George F. and Frederick W. Root
- Occupations: Music Publisher composer Chorister; Vocalist
- Employer: E. O. Excell (Company)
- Known for: Leading American hymnbook publisher, arrangement of "Amazing Grace", gospel songs "Count your blessings" and "I'll Be a Sunbeam"
- Spouse: Eliza Jane (Bell) Excell (m. 1871)
- Children: William Alonzo

Edwin Othello Excell (December 13, 1851 – June 10, 1921), commonly known as E. O. Excell, was a prominent American publisher, composer, song leader, and singer of music for church, Sunday school, and evangelistic meetings during the late nineteenth and early twentieth centuries. Some of the significant collaborators in his vocal and publishing work included Sam P. Jones, William E. Biederwolf, Gipsy Smith, Charles Reign Scoville, J. Wilbur Chapman, W. E. M. Hackleman, Charles H. Gabriel and D. B. Towner.

His 1909 stanza selection and arrangement of "Amazing Grace" became the most widely used and familiar setting of that hymn by the second half of the twentieth century. The influence of his sacred music on American popular culture through revival meetings, religious conventions, circuit chautauquas, and church hymnals was substantial enough by the 1920s to garner a satirical reference by Sinclair Lewis in the novel Elmer Gantry.

Excell compiled or contributed to about ninety secular and sacred song books and is estimated to have written, composed, or arranged more than two thousand of the songs he published. The music publishing business he started in 1881 and that eventually bore his name was the highest volume producer of hymnbooks in America at the time of his death.

== Early years ==
Excell was the son of German Reformed minister and self-published author J. J. Excell. He was born in Uniontown, Stark County, Ohio and attended public schools in Ohio and Pennsylvania. After marrying in 1871 near Brady's Bend, Pennsylvania, he relocated to that state and supported his family for several years as a plasterer, bricklayer, and singing instructor. His focus was turned to sacred music through his experience leading songs at revivals and worship services of Methodist Episcopal churches, first in East Brady and then, starting in 1881, Oil City, Pennsylvania. Between 1877 and 1883 he studied music formally at the Normal Musical Institutes of George F. Root where he also received vocal training under Root's son, Frederick. He moved to Chicago, base of Root's operations, in 1883 to pursue music publishing in earnest.

== Vocalist and song leader ==
Excell was described as "a big, robust six-footer, with a six-in caliber voice" and extraordinary range that enabled him to solo as baritone or tenor. Publisher George H. Doran observed him leading songs at a revival and later noted that Excell "was a master of mass control; he might easily have become conductor of some mighty chorus". These talents fostered his early success as a rural singing teacher in Pennsylvania and helped secure a position as church choirmaster for the two years preceding his move to Illinois.

Two important contacts made during his early years in Chicago were Benjamin F. Jacobs and John H. Vincent. Both men had been heavily involved with the uniform Sunday school lesson system established among many Protestant denominations during the early 1870s. Vincent was also co-founder of the original Chautauqua Assembly and involved with the burgeoning church youth movements of the era, such as Christian Endeavor and Epworth Leagues. Excell assisted with the music of their Sunday school work for at least two years and later served as music editor for correspondence courses Vincent established through the Chautauqua Press. He also performed as a vocalist for programs at the Chautauqua Institution. Insights gained from these associations were significant in that much of what Excell would later publish targeted Sunday school and youth program music needs.

The Methodist Episcopal church of Excell's day was still divided into northern and southern denominations created by an antebellum split. Excell and Vincent were affiliated with the northern branch known as the Methodist Episcopal Church. In 1885 he met Sam P. Jones, a Georgia evangelist of the Methodist Episcopal Church, South, and was invited to join him as vocalist the following year, which included a campaign in Toronto during October 1886.

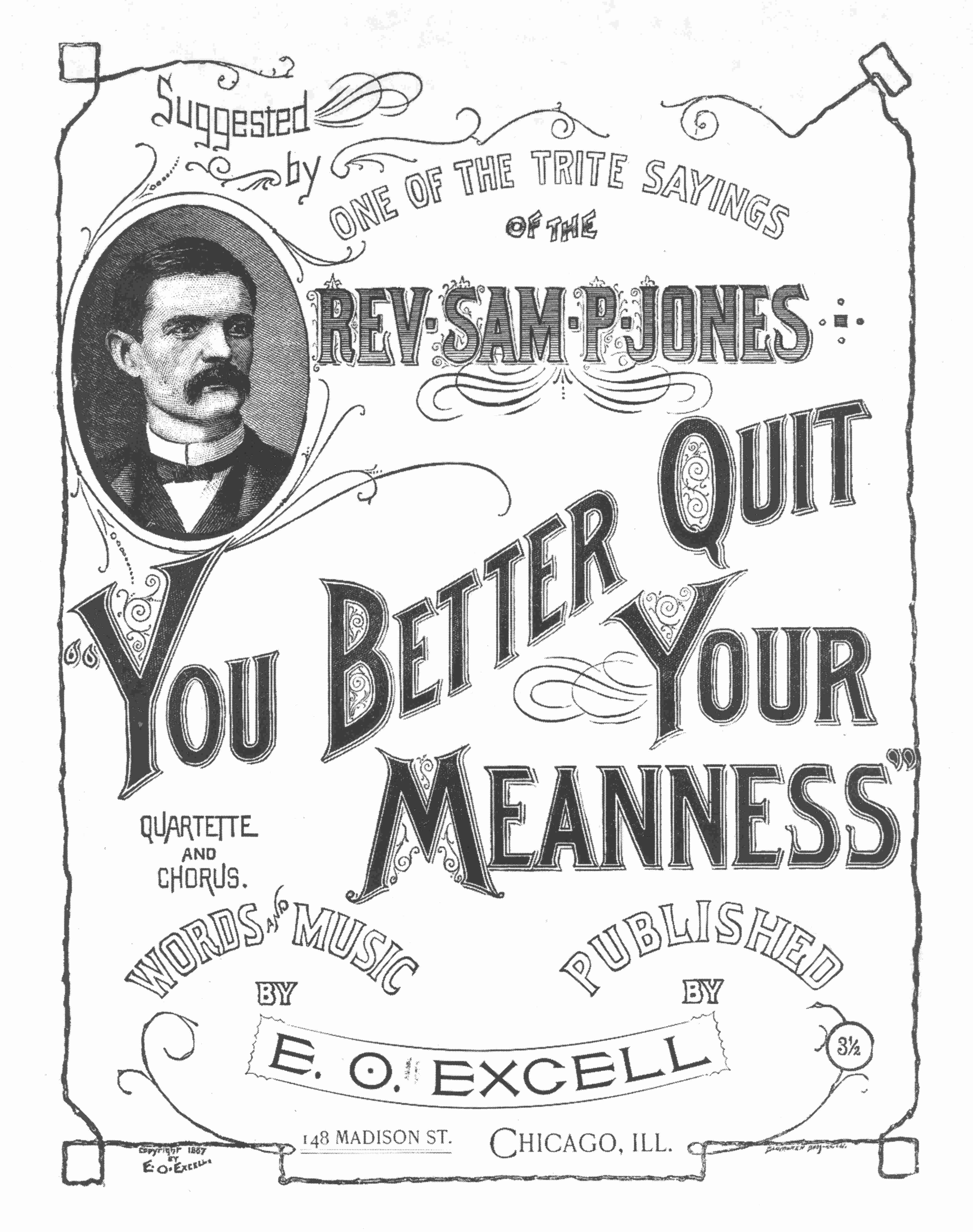
1887 sheet music

Jones' musical director at that time was Marcellus J. Maxwell of Oxford, Georgia. He was also a capable singer and songwriter, though more reserved than Excell. They became an effective musical team known informally as "Ex and Max". At some point prior to 1895, Excell became the principal song leader and vocalist Jones referred to as "this big-hearted, noble soul ..., my chorister, Brother Excell." The respect was mutual and good natured. In 1887 Excell wrote and published a spiritualized rendition of "one of the trite sayings of the Reverend Sam P. Jones" titled You Better Quit Your Meanness. It was dedicated to Jones by "his Co-Worker, E. O. Excell". They worked together throughout the United States and Canada until Jones' death in 1906. Though their twenty-year partnership was not exclusive, it was one of the most significant influences on Excell's career.

While serving as Jones' chorister, Excell became adept at crafting large volunteer choirs out of recruits from multiple local churches that had never sung together before. These combined revival and evangelistic meeting choirs typically had fewer than 400 participants. However, William Shaw of Christian Endeavor listed Excell among Ira Sankey, Homer Rodeheaver, and other distinguished musicians who had led choirs in the range of one thousand to four thousand voices at their conventions.

Excell assisted a number of other evangelists and religious conference leaders in various musical capacities. He worked as a vocalist for William E. Biederwolf, a Presbyterian minister active with the Winona Lake Bible Conference and its related chautauqua, with whom he also collaborated on a number of hymnbooks. During the final decade of his life he assisted with the music program of British evangelist Gipsy Smith.

== Music publisher, compiler and editor ==
Excell compiled a collection of hymns and gospel songs around 1880 which was published as Sacred Echoes by John J. Hood of Philadelphia in 1881, the year he marked as his start in the business. Sing the Gospel, published around the time of the move to Chicago, was issued under the "E. O. Excell" imprint. Echoes of Eden followed two years later in 1884. An archetype of later "combined" song books was produced in 1885 when contents of Sing the Gospel, Echoes of Eden and limited new material were repackaged into The Gospel in Song, a hymnbook later advertised to contain the songs and solos sung by Excell at Sam Jones' Gospel meetings.

=== Sam Jones influence ===
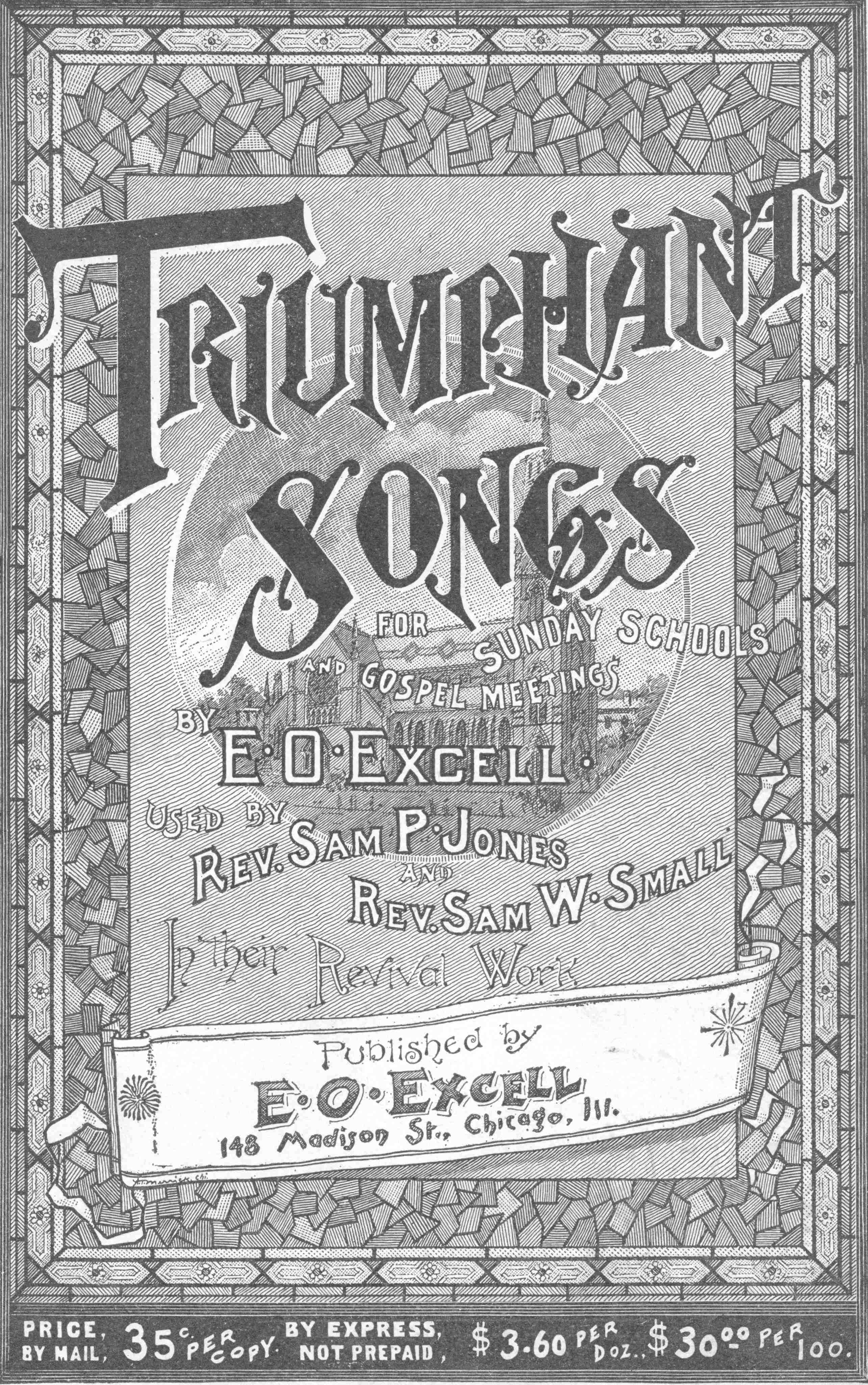
1887 hymnbook title page

The working relationship initiated with Jones in 1886 proved to be a pattern of the age. A contemporary writer explained that prominent evangelists always "had their leading singers, they were billed on the hoardings of the cities after the manner of theatrical companies – Moody and Sankey; Sam Jones and Excell; Chapman and Alexander; Torrey and Towner; and so on." The promotional benefit for a sacred music publisher was enormous. Excell's books were used in Jones' revivals and the contents revised over time to suit changing preferences and the needs of the campaigns.

Three song books aimed at different applications were published in 1886 and 1887. All three became series that ran through most of the years Excell was affiliated with Jones' ministry:

- Excell's Anthems (1886) for choirs was followed by volumes 2 through 6 and three combined editions of which Excell's Anthems, Vols. 5 & 6 Combined (1899) was the last.
- Excell's School Songs (1887) for school, class, and home use was followed by numbers 2 through 4 and two combined editions ending with Excell's School Songs, Nos. 3 & 4 Combined (1903).
- Triumphant Songs (1887) for Sunday schools and revivals was followed by numbers 2 through 5 and two combined editions (Nos. 1 & 2 and Nos. 3 & 4). The last book in this series was Triumphant Songs No. 5 (1896).

Make His Praise Glorious, published in 1900 as the Triumphant Songs series was approaching its end, contained Excell's initial arrangement of "Amazing Grace" based upon the tune "New Britain". He compiled and published at least another six song books with the E. O. Excell imprint during his final years with Jones. Excell and his song books received significant exposure in the majority of U.S. states and Canadian provinces of his day during the twenty years they worked together.

=== Collaborations ===
Only about seven new song books were published by Excell under his own imprint in the years following Jones' death, though the annual quantity of books sold still managed to more than double during that time. The business changed to involve a greater number of collaborations destined for other publishers and private label printing of denominational hymnals. Some of the most substantial were:

- Methodist Episcopal – Early collaborations were established through Excell's Methodist connections. Two hymnbooks were compiled for the Book Concerns of the Methodist Episcopal Church in 1897 and 1899. Unfortunately his relationships with the publishing authorities within this northern branch of American Methodism were irreconcilably damaged in 1900 by the aftermath of a book contract he allegedly negotiated directly with the General Secretary of the Epworth League. However, opportunities with the Methodist Episcopal Church, South were unaffected and at least four hymn books were produced between 1909 and 1918 with W. C. Everett, manager of the Methodist Publishing House in Dallas, Texas.
- Charles Reign Scoville – At least three hymnbooks were compiled with this evangelist of the Christian Church and director of the Winona Assembly and Summer School Association for his C. R. Scoville imprint between 1909 and about 1915.
- W. E. M. Hackleman – Five or more hymn collections were produced between 1910 and 1914 with this Christian Church musician and published by the Christian Board of Publication or Hackleman Music Company. Hackleman also worked on another three collections credited to Excell that were published posthumously.
- William E. Biederwolf – Three hymn collections and a combined edition were developed with this Presbyterian evangelist between 1912 and 1917 for Glad Tidings Publishing Company. Excell had also been listed earlier as a special contributor on Hymns of His Praise No. 2 that Biederwolf compiled in 1906 with assistance from Homer Rodeheaver. One other hymn book, "Songs of the Evangelist" crediting both Biederwolf and Excell as contributors, was published posthumously in 1925.
- Hope Publishing Company – Joy to the World was compiled in 1915 for this publishing firm of another Chicago Methodist, Henry S. Date. While Excell continued to publish collections under his own imprint, he worked on another three Hope hymnbooks with Date's successors through 1919.
- Single song book collaborations – Excell worked on one-book projects with a diverse number of his contemporaries. Some of the more notable included:
  - William Shaw – Treasurer of Christian Endeavor on Jubilant Praise (1900).
  - J. Wilbur Chapman – Evangelist known for his work with singer Charles Alexander and moderator of the Presbyterian General Assembly on Winona Hymns (1906).
  - D. B. Towner – Vocalist and musician with D. L. Moody's organization on Famous Gospel Hymns (1907).
  - French E. Oliver – Presbyterian evangelist and protégé of Charles Alexander on Oliver's Songs of Deliverance (1910).
  - Theodore M. Hammond – Congregational founder of Hammond Publishing of Milwaukee and regent of University of Wisconsin on The Very Best Songs for Sunday School (1911).
  - Marion Lawrance – Congregational Sunday school superintendent (laity) and general secretary of the International Sunday School Association on Eternal Praise (1917).

The portfolios of copyrights for contemporary songs and plates for classic hymns that Excell accumulated as a publisher and composer also led to printing work on denominational hymnals. He produced the 1909 edition of Spiritual Hymns of Brethren in Christ in which he held copyrights for about one third of the six hundred songs selected by the hymnal committee. Another example was the original edition of Great Songs of the Church which he produced for the Churches of Christ in 1921.

=== E. O. Excell Company ===
Excell developed approximately fifty song books and contributed to at least another thirty-eight over his forty-year publishing career. By 1914, his company had produced close to 10 million books and was selling them at a rate of nearly a half million per year. Annual output had grown to more than a million books by 1921, though with margins at wholesale levels.

Excell's only child, William Alonzo, participated in both the musical event and publishing businesses. At least one publication, Chorus Choir Selections (1918), bore the "E. O. Excell & Son" imprint. "E. O. Excell Company" was utilized on publications created after the founder's death. Excell's grandson, known as E. O. Excell, Jr, was also engaged in the family publishing business by 1927.

== Lyricist, composer and arranger ==
Estimates of the number of songs authored, composed, or arranged by Excell range from two to three thousand. Two that remain well known are his 1909 arrangement of John Newton's "Amazing Grace" and the tune he composed for Johnson Oatman's "Count Your Blessings".

== Death and legacy ==
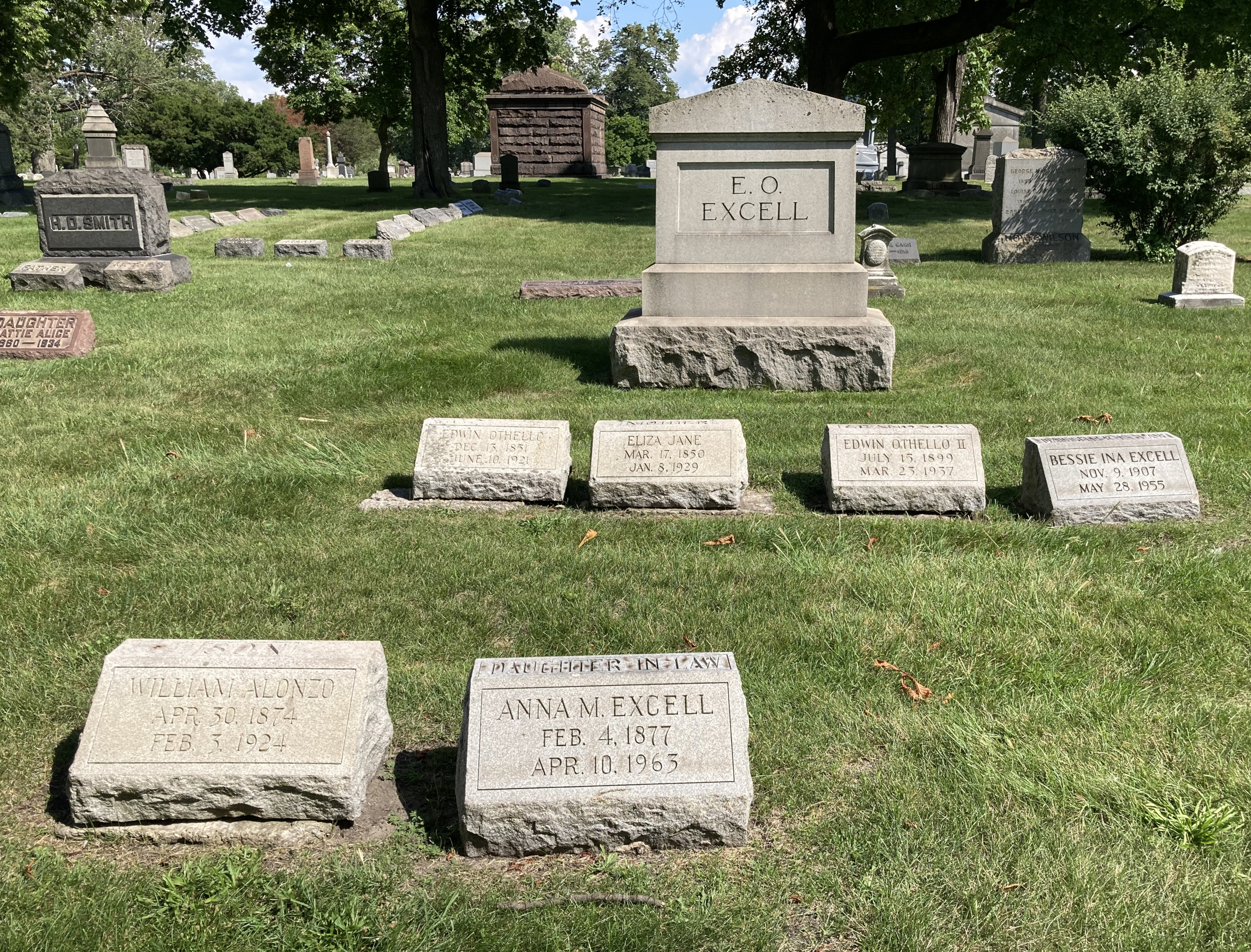
Excell's grave at Oak Woods Cemetery

Excell fell ill while assisting Gipsy Smith with a revival in Louisville, Kentucky and returned to Chicago to be hospitalized. He died on June 10, 1921, after more than thirty weeks in Wesley Memorial Hospital. He was buried at Oak Woods Cemetery. Colleagues at the International Sunday School Association, where he had served for thirty-six years, said the following of him at their next convention:

Mr. Excell will be remembered as the great song leader. Probably no man who ever lived, and certainly in this country, was more capable than he in directing great audiences in singing. He was large of body and happy in his disposition. He was never known to lose his temper or his smile in his endeavor to make the people sing.

— Herbert H. Smith, (ed.), Organized Sunday School Work in North America, 1918–1922

At least five books listing him as a contributor were published posthumously. One of these was The Excell Hymnal published by his company in 1925; it was completed by his long-time collaborators Hamp Sewell and W. E. M. Hackleman as "a fitting climax to its long line of illustrious predecessors".

Heirs sold the large E. O. Excell Company copyright portfolio to the Hope Publishing Company in 1931 which they combined with their prior acquisition of a former Ira Sankey firm to create the Biglow-Main-Excell Company. The most popular Excell compositions at the time of the sale were I'll Be a Sunbeam and Count Your Blessings.
