= Suckle (band) =

Suckle were an indie pop band formed in Glasgow, Scotland in the mid-1990s by former Vaselines member Frances McKee, along with her sister and co-vocalist in the group Marie McKee and another former Vaselines member James Seenan. After early releases, the line-up was completed by Elanor Taylor (keyboards, flute), Brian McEwan (guitar), his brother Kenny McEwan (drums, formerly of Long Fin Killie), and Vicky Morton (bass). The band's first release was the Hormonal Secretions EP in 1997, followed by "Cybilla" in 1998. They were then signed by Chemikal Underground, who issued "To Be King" in 2000, followed by their debut album, Against Nurture, described as "bringing to mind Nick Cave's Bad Seeds fronted by the vocal duo from Stereolab". After a further EP, The Sun Is God, the band split up. The band were also compared to Belle and Sebastian and Clannad during their time together.

While together, the band recorded two sessions for John Peel's BBC Radio 1 show, the first in 1997 and the second in 2000.

Frances McKee later recorded as a solo artist.

== Discography ==
=== Singles ===
- Hormonal Secreations EP (1997) Detox
- "Cybilla" (1998) LeftHand
- "To Be King" (2000) Chemikal Underground
- The Sun Is God EP (2000) Chemikal Underground

=== Albums ===
- Against Nurture (2000) Chemikal Underground
