= Dying for It =

EP by The Vaselines
- Released: March 1988
- Recorded: 26–27 October 1987, Pierhouse Studios, Edinburgh
- Genre: Indie rock, indie pop, noise pop
- Length: 11:02
- Label: 53rd & 3rd
- Producer: Stephen Pastel; The Vaselines

The Vaselines chronology
Son of a Gun (1987)	Dying for It (1988)	Dum-Dum (1989)

Dying for It is the second extended play by Scottish indie pop group The Vaselines, released in March 7 1988. The EP was later included on their career retrospective collection The Way of the Vaselines: A Complete History. The song "Teenage Superstars" was later included as the fourth track on their debut album Dum-Dum in 1989. The song "Molly's Lips" is named in tribute to the well-known Scottish television personality Molly Weir.

Alternative rock figurehead Kurt Cobain listed the Dying for It EP as his fourth favorite 'album' ever. His band Nirvana covered "Molly's Lips", as well as a song from the earlier Vaselines EP, on their 1992 compilation Incesticide. Nirvana also performed the song "Jesus Doesn't Want Me for a Sunbeam" (original song name "Jesus Wants Me for a Sunbeam") for their MTV Unplugged in New York concert.

== Track listing ==
All songs written by Kelly and McKee.

=== Side A ===
1. "Dying for It"
2. "Molly's Lips"

=== Side B ===
1. "Teenage Superstars"
2. "Jesus Wants Me for a Sunbeam"

== Personnel ==
- Eugene Kelly — vocals, guitars
- Frances McKee — vocals, guitars
- James Seenan — bass
- Charlie Kelly — drums

=== Additional personnel ===
- David Keegan — lead guitar on "Dying for It"
- Sophie Pragnell — viola on "Jesus Wants Me for A Sunbeam" and "Dying for It"
- Stephen Pastel — producer
- Ian Beveridge and Peter Haigh — engineers

== Charts ==
Chart (1988)	Peak position
UK Indie Singles (MRIB)	11
