= Son of a Gun (EP) =

EP by The Vaselines
- Released: 14 August 1987
- Recorded: March 1987, Berkeley Street Studios, Glasgow
- Genre: Indie pop, jangle pop, indie rock
- Label: 53rd & 3rd
- Producer: Stephen Pastel; The Vaselines

The Vaselines chronology
Son of a Gun (1987)	Dying for It (1988)

Son of a Gun is the debut extended play single by Glasgow alternative rock group the Vaselines. The title-song of the EP came to a wider audience after a Nirvana Peel session version of it, along with "Molly's Lips", was released on their compilation album Incesticide.

"You Think You're a Man" is a cover of a song written by Geoff Deane for the cult-film actor Divine.

== Track listing ==
All songs written by Frances McKee and Eugene Kelly except where noted.

=== Side A ===
1. "Son of a Gun"
2. "Rory Rides Me Raw"

=== Side B ===
1. "You Think You're a Man" (Geoff Deane)

== Personnel ==
- Eugene Kelly — vocals, guitar
- Frances McKee — vocals, guitar

=== Additional personnel ===
- Aggi Wright — keyboards on "Son of a Gun"
- Stephen Pastel — producer, additional guitar on "You Think You're a Man"
- Gordon Rintoul — engineer

== Charts ==
Chart (1987)	Peak position
UK Indie Singles (MRIB)	26
