= Dum-Dum (album) =

Studio album by The Vaselines
- Released: June 1989
- Recorded: December 1988 – January 1989
- Studio: Chamber Studios, Edinburgh
- Genre: Indie pop, indie rock, alternative rock
- Length: 27:19
- Label: 53rd and 3rd Records
- Producer: Jamie Watson; The Vaselines

The Vaselines chronology
Dying for It (1988)	Dum-Dum (1989)	The Way of the Vaselines: A Complete History (1992)

Dum-Dum is the first full-length album by the alternative rock band The Vaselines, released in 1989. It was recorded at Chamber Studios, Edinburgh, between December 1988 and January 1989. The album was produced by the band and Jamie Watson, and was included in its entirety for their career retrospective The Way of the Vaselines: A Complete History.

The musicians contributing the synthesized strings to "Slushy" and the Indian raga sounds to "Lovecraft" have not been publicly identified. Other songs recorded during the Dum-Dum sessions include "Bitch", "Dying For It (The Blues)" and "Let's Get Ugly". "Teenage Superstars" had already been featured on their 1988 EP Dying for It. The album was re-issued on clear vinyl for Record Store Day in 2018.

== Track listing ==
All tracks written by Kelly and McKee.

=== Side one ===
1. "Sex Sux (Amen)"
2. "Slushy"
3. "Monsterpussy"
4. "Teenage Superstars"
5. "No Hope"

=== Side two ===
1. "Oliver Twisted"
2. "The Day I Was a Horse"
3. "Dum-Dum"
4. "Hairy"
5. "Lovecraft"

== Personnel ==
=== The Vaselines ===
- Eugene Kelly – vocals, guitars
- Frances McKee – vocals, guitars
- James Seenan – bass
- Charlie Kelly – drums

=== Additional personnel ===
- Jamie Watson – engineer; slide guitar on "The Day I Was A Horse"
- Sophie Pragnell – viola on "Oliver Twisted"
