= Frances McKee =

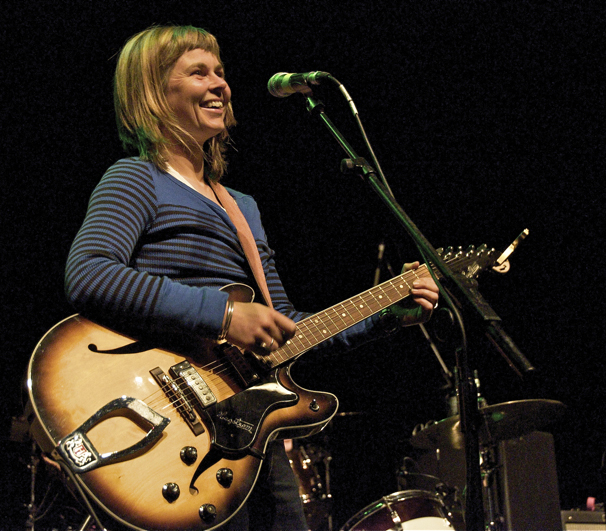
- Frances McKee in October 2009

Background information
- Origin: Parkhead, Glasgow, Scotland
- Genres: Alternative rock, indie pop
- Instruments: Guitar, vocals, keyboards
- Years active: 1983–present
- Label: Chemikal Underground Rosary Music

Frances McKee is a Scottish singer and songwriter known best for her work in the Scottish indie band The Vaselines.

== Background ==
McKee's involvement with music began as a teenager in the early 1980s when she met Duglas T. Stewart from Bellshill. With McKee and his friends Norman Blake and Sean Dickson, Stewart formed a group, known by various outrageous names before settling on The Pretty Flowers. The group would play impromptu, happening-style gigs in the local park and at Bellshill's Hattonrigg Hotel. McKee became disillusioned with the group shortly after they settled on The Pretty Flowers name and eventually left. The group later morphed into the BMX Bandits.

The Vaselines formed in Glasgow, Scotland in 1986. McKee and Eugene Kelly wrote almost all of their material. By this time, McKee was beginning to learn how to play guitar, which is why many 80s Vaselines songs only feature certain chords. They signed to 53rd and 3rd and following the release of two EPs, Son of a Gun and Dying for It, and their first album, Dum-Dum, in 1989, the band split up. Kurt Cobain of Nirvana was a big fan of the band, and covered three of their songs: "Molly's Lips", "Son of a Gun" and "Jesus Wants Me for a Sunbeam". He also named his daughter Frances Bean Cobain after her. McKee and Kelly briefly reunited in 1990 to play a show supporting Nirvana in Edinburgh in 1990. This would be their last performance together until 2006.

Following a post-Vaselines break, she began making music with Vaselines bass player James Seenan in 1994, writing material of a more-mellow flavour. These songs were released under the name Painkillers at first. They released two singles under this name in 1994 and 1996. They changed their name to Suckle in 1997 following the addition of more bandmembers. Initially coming out on 4AD offshoot Detox Artefacts, the band released one album, two EPs and three singles before splitting up in late 2000. They also recorded two sessions for John Peel.

Against Nurture, the only Suckle long player, was released in May 2000 on Chemikal Underground.

On 10 April 2006, McKee released her first solo album, Sunny Moon.

In the summer of 2006, Frances McKee and Eugene Kelly took to the stage together for the first time since 1990, to perform a set of The Vaselines songs, as part of a joint tour to promote their individual solo albums. This led to The Vaselines reforming (minus the old rhythm section) on 24 April 2008 for a charity show for the Malawi Orphan Support group at Glasgow's MONO venue.

Since 2008, The Vaselines have continued to perform around the world, with members of Belle & Sebastian supporting their live set. On 5 May 2009, Sub Pop released Enter the Vaselines. A deluxe-edition reissue of the 1992 Sub Pop release, it includes remastered versions of the band's two EPs, album, as well as demos and live recordings from 1986 and 1988. In 2010, they released a second album, Sex with an X.

The Vaselines' third album, V for Vaselines, was self-released in 2014 on the band's own label, Rosary Music, in order to maintain creative control.

McKee features in the 2017 documentary Teenage Superstars.

== Personal life ==
McKee has been practicing yoga since 1990 and began training to teach in 1995, gaining her qualifications in 1997. She opened the Yoga Extension studio in Jordanhill, Glasgow in 2006, which teaches the Iyengar yoga practice. Yoga Extension is currently located in Charing Cross, having moved locations in 2017.

In a 2014 interview with Under the Radar, McKee discussed her support for the Scottish independence referendum, saying, "There are a lot of creative people in Scotland ready for the change a yes vote will bring".

== Releases ==
- The Vaselines
  - Son of a Gun (EP) (1987 53rd & 3rd)
  - Dying for It (1988 53rd & 3rd)
  - Dum-Dum (1989 Rough Trade)
  - The Vaselines / Beat Happening (1991 K Records – recorded live in London 16 June 1988)
  - The Way of the Vaselines: A Complete History (1992 Sub Pop)
  - All the Stuff and More... (1992 Avalanche)
  - Enter the Vaselines (2009 Sub Pop)
  - Sex with an X (2010 Sub Pop)
  - V for Vaselines (2014 Rosary Music)
- Painkillers
  - Tropical Zodiac single (1994 Human Condition)
  - Lost in Space single (1996, Pi Recordings)
- Suckle
  - Hormonal Secreations EP (1997 Detox Artifacts, UK)
  - Symposium/Boyfriend (1997 Detox Artifacts, UK)
  - Cybilla/Sex With Animals (1998 Left Hand Recordings)
  - Against Nurture album (2000 Chemikal Underground Records)
  - To Be King (2000 Chemikal Underground Records)
  - The Sun Is God EP (2000 Chemikal Underground Records)
- Solo
  - Sunny Moon album (2006 Analogue Catalogue)
