= The Vaselines =

Scottish alternative rock band

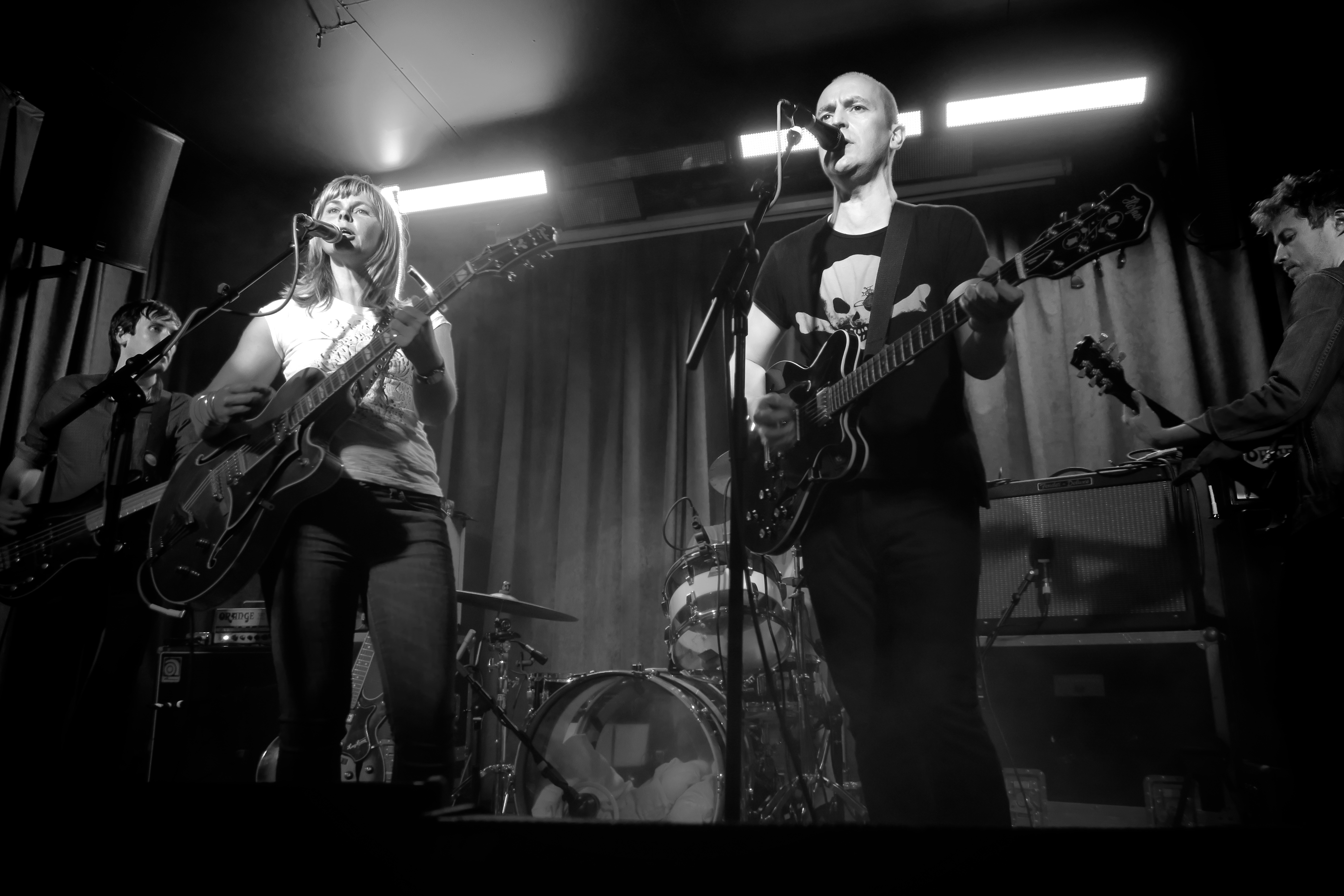
- The Vaselines performing in 2014

Background information
- Origin: Glasgow, Scotland
- Genres: Alternative rock; indie pop; indie rock; jangle pop; noise pop; twee pop
- Years active: 1986–1989; 1990; 2006; 2008–present
- Labels: Sub Pop; K; 53rd & 3rd; Rosary Music; Rough Trade
- Members: Eugene Kelly; Frances McKee; Michael McGaughrin; Carla Easton; Graeme Smillie
- Past members: James Seenan; Charlie Kelly; Stevie Jackson; Bobby Kildea; Paul Foley; Gareth Russell; Scott Paterson

The Vaselines are a Scottish alternative rock band. Formed in Glasgow in 1986, the band was originally a duo between its songwriters Eugene Kelly and Frances McKee, but later added James Seenan and Eugene's brother Charlie Kelly on bass and drums respectively from the band Secession.

McKee had formerly been a member of a band named the Pretty Flowers with Duglas T. Stewart, Norman Blake, Janice McBride and Sean Dickson. Eugene Kelly had formerly played in the Famous Monsters.

== History ==
The band formed in 1986, initially as a duo backed by a drum machine. Originally intending to create a fanzine, Kelly and McKee decided to form a band instead. Stephen Pastel of the Pastels is credited with coming up with their name. After playing their first gigs, they signed to Pastel's 53rd & 3rd label and recorded the Son of a Gun EP with him producing, released in summer 1987. The EP featured a cover of Divine's "You Think You're a Man" on its B-side.

By late 1987, Eugene's brother Charlie Kelly had joined on drums with James Seenan on bass. With this line-up and with Stephen Pastel producing again, they recorded the Dying for It EP, released in early 1988. It featured the songs "Molly's Lips" and "Jesus Wants Me for a Sunbeam," both of which American rock band Nirvana would later cover.

In June 1989 they released their first album, Dum-Dum, again on 53rd & 3rd but distributed by Rough Trade. The band broke up concurrently with its release, due jointly to the dissolution of 53rd & 3rd and the end of Kelly and McKee's romantic relationship. They briefly reformed in October 1990 to open for Nirvana when they played in Edinburgh.

Kelly went on to found the band Captain America (later renamed Eugenius after legal threats from Marvel Comics), supporting Nirvana on their UK tour. Following solo performances, Kelly released the album Man Alive in 2004. McKee founded the bands Painkillers in 1994 and Suckle in 1997 before releasing her first solo album, Sunny Moon, in 2006.

Though they were not widely known outside Scotland during their short career, their association with Nirvana brought them exposure, with Nirvana frontman Kurt Cobain once describing Kelly and McKee as his "favorite songwriters in the whole world". At the 1991 Reading Festival, Kelly joined Nirvana on stage for a performance of "Molly's Lips". In 1992, Sub Pop released The Way of the Vaselines: A Complete History, a compilation that contained the Vaselines' entire body of work at the time.

After Nirvana covered "Molly's Lips" and "Son of a Gun", both of which were released on their compilation album Incesticide (1992), and "Jesus Wants Me for a Sunbeam" (retitled "Jesus Doesn't Want Me for a Sunbeam") for their live special MTV Unplugged in New York (1994), the Vaselines gained a new audience. "I've never made any money apart from my Nirvana royalties," Kelly noted. "It was my tiny bit of rock history, but a strange feeling because by then I was striving for recognition with other bands. I still haven't come to terms with it, although it allowed me to go on playing, and get a mortgage without having a job."

== Reformation ==
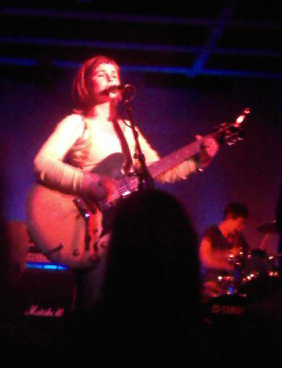
Frances McKee with the Vaselines in Portland, OR, 13 May 2009.

In 2006, McKee and Kelly reunited for a joint tour to promote both of their solo albums, alternating as headliners and performing Vaselines songs as well.

The Vaselines reformed (minus the old rhythm section) on 24 April 2008 for a charity show for the Malawi Orphan Support group at Glasgow's MONO venue. Invitation was by word-of-mouth with no press announcements.

The Vaselines performed on 16 May 2008 at Scotland's Tigerfest. Members of Belle and Sebastian supported their live set. The band then played their first-ever U.S. performance at Maxwell's in Hoboken, New Jersey on 9 July. The band also performed at Sub Pop Records' 20th Anniversary SP20 music festival on 12 July at Marymoor Park, just outside Seattle, Washington.

On 27 March 2009, they played their first London date in 20 years at the London Forum. On 5 May, Sub Pop released Enter the Vaselines. A deluxe-edition reissue of the 1992 Sub Pop release, it includes remastered versions of the band's two EPs (Son of a Gun and Dying for It), and a remixed version of their sole album (Dum-Dum), as well as demos and live recordings from 1986 and 1988. The band then played six tour dates in the U.S., beginning on 10 May in Los Angeles and moving on to San Francisco, Portland, Seattle, Chicago and Brooklyn. The band finished their May tour at the Primavera Sound festival in Barcelona.

In July, they performed at the Uncut Arena for the Latitude Festival in Suffolk. On 9 October, the Vaselines made a long-awaited return to Edinburgh to support Mudhoney at HMV Picture House.

The Vaselines' second studio album, Sex with an X, was released by Sub Pop on 14 September 2010. The band were chosen by festival curators Belle and Sebastian to appear at the second Bowlie Weekender festival in the UK, presented by All Tomorrow's Parties in December of that year.

In 2011, the band performed a cover version of the Nirvana song "Lithium" as part of Spin magazine's exclusive album Newermind, a tribute album to Nirvana's Nevermind (1991) performed by different artists.

The Vaselines announced their third studio album, V for Vaselines, in June 2014, which was released on 29 September 2014 by Rosary Music. "One Lost Year" from the album was made available for free download from their SoundCloud page. The single "High Tide Low Tide" followed in August, promoted with a music video.

The story of the Vaselines from 1986 to the early 1990s is covered in the 2017 documentary Teenage Superstars, in which both McKee and Kelly feature.

The band features in the 2024 book Postcards from Scotland, detailing the 1980s and 1990s independent music scene in Scotland.

=== Current members ===
- Eugene Kelly – vocals, guitar, harmonica (1986–1990, 2006, 2008–present)
- Frances McKee – vocals, guitar (1986–1990, 2006, 2008–present)
- Michael McGaughrin – drums (2009–present)
- Graeme Smillie – bass, keyboards (2014–present)
- Carla Easton – keyboards (2017–present)

=== Former members ===
- James Seenan – bass (1987–1990)
- Charlie Kelly – drums (1987–1990)
- Stevie Jackson – guitar (2008–2014)
- Bobby Kildea – bass (2008–2014)
- Paul Foley – guitar (2010–2011)
- Gareth Russell – bass (2010–2011)
- Scott Paterson – guitar (2014–2016)

== Discography ==
=== LPs ===
Year	Title	Label	UK Indie Chart
1989	Dum-Dum	53rd & 3rd	-
2010	Sex with an X	Sub Pop	-
2014	V for Vaselines	Rosary Music	-

=== EPs ===
Year	Title	Label	UK Indie Chart
1987	Son of a Gun	53rd & 3rd	26
1988	Dying for It	53rd & 3rd	11

=== Compilations ===
Year	Title	Label
1991	The Vaselines / Beat Happening - Recorded Live in London, England 1988	K Records
1992	The Way of the Vaselines: A Complete History	Sub Pop
1992	All the Stuff and More...	Avalanche
2009	Enter the Vaselines	Sub Pop

== Sources ==
- Ankeny, Jason. "The Vaselines AllMusic. Retrieved 2 May 2004.
