= Jesus Wants Me for a Sunbeam =

1987 song by the Vaselines

Song by the Vaselines

from the EP Dying for It
- Released: 1987
- Genre: Indie pop
- Length: 3:31
- Label: 53rd & 3rd
- Songwriters: Eugene Kelly, Frances McKee

"Jesus Doesn't Want Me for a Sunbeam"

Song by Nirvana

from the album MTV Unplugged in New York
- Released: 1 November 1994
- Recorded: 18 November 1993
- Venue: Sony Music Studios, New York City
- Genre: Grunge
- Length: 4:37
- Label: DGC
- Songwriters: Eugene Kelly, Frances McKee
- Producers: Alex Coletti, Scott Litt, Nirvana

MTV Unplugged in New York track listing
- 13 tracks: 1. "About a Girl"; 2. "Come as You Are"; 3. "Jesus Doesn't Want Me for a Sunbeam"; 4. "The Man Who Sold the World"; 5. "Pennyroyal Tea"; 6. "Dumb"; 7. "Polly"; 8. "On a Plain"; 9. "Something in the Way"; 10. "Plateau"; 11. "Oh, Me"; 12. "Lake of Fire"; 13. "All Apologies"; 14. "Where Did You Sleep Last Night"

"Jesus Wants Me for a Sunbeam" is a song originally recorded by the Scottish alternative band the Vaselines. It was later covered by American rock band Nirvana in 1993 who renamed it "Jesus Doesn't Want Me for a Sunbeam".

== History ==
"Jesus Wants Me for a Sunbeam" is a song originally recorded by the Scottish alternative band the Vaselines for their EP Dying for It. It is a parody of the Christian children's hymn "I'll Be a Sunbeam", which has the opening line "Jesus wants me for a sunbeam." The Vaselines re-released the song in 1992 on the compilation albums The Way of The Vaselines: A Complete History, and All the Stuff and More.

In the version featured on the MTV Unplugged in New York album, Nirvana frontman Kurt Cobain refers to the song as "a rendition of an old Christian song, I think. But we do it the Vaselines' way." At a Nirvana concert that took place on 30 December 1993, at the Great Western Forum in Inglewood, California, Cobain dedicated the song to the recently deceased River Phoenix.

Two more versions were released by Nirvana on their 2004 box set With the Lights Out. These were an acoustic version recorded in Portugal in 1994, and a live electric performance on the DVD section of the box set that was recorded at the Paramount Theatre in Seattle on 31 October 1991. This version was re-released in 2011 as a bonus track on the 20th anniversary edition of the Nevermind album and on the Live at the Paramount DVD and Blu-ray.
