= Andy Classen =

German record producer and musician

Andy Classen is a German heavy metal record producer, sound engineer and guitarist.

== Career ==
=== Holy Moses ===
Classen began his career in 1980 as a guitarist for the German thrash metal band Holy Moses, fronted by his ex-wife Sabina Classen. In 1989 the band bought a house in the village of Borgentreich-Bühne in the vicinity of Warburg, North Rhine-Westphalia. In 1990 they founded a record label named 'West Virginia Records' and opened the Stage-One-Studio in their new house (so named because "Bühne" is German for "stage").

He remained lead guitarist in Holy Moses till 1994. Creative differences that had arisen during the production of the Holy Moses album No Matter What's the Cause (1994) with bassist Dan Lilker and Ryker's drummer Meff lead to Andy Classen leaving the band. Ultimately he and Sabina divorced, and West Virginia Records was dissolved.

Holy Moses was inactive till 2001 when it was revived by Sabina Classen, with Andy Classen acting as occasional songwriter and producer. In 2005 Holy Moses recorded the album Strength Power Will Passion the first without Andy Classen's involvement.

=== Producer ===
Andy Classen became producer and engineer in Stage-One-Studio in 1990. Among his first productions were the albums When War Begins... by the German thrashcore band Warpath and Mc Gillroy the Housefly by the German psychedelic death metal band Incubator, both of which were critically acclaimed, with the latter still having a cult following in the death metal underground. He also became influential in the German hardcore punk scene, being the producer for bands like Ryker's and Brightside.

In 1994 he took over the studio completely and produced for other labels like Nuclear Blast, Century Media Records, Gun Records, Metal Blade Records, AFM Records, Massacre Records, Season of Mist, Armageddon Music etc.

During the nineties Andy Classen established himself as one of the premier producers for hardcore, thrash metal and death metal music in Europe. His sound aesthetics usually are described as aggressive and powerful, yet transparent. Among others he produced records for the bands Dew-Scented, Tankard, Disbelief, President Evil (all from Germany), Asphyx (Netherlands), Legen Beltza (Basque Country), The Old Dead Tree (France), Graveworm (Italy) and Deafness by Noise (Croatia).

From the year 2000, he has found increasing recognition for his work in the international scene, with bands like Rotting Christ from Greece, Criminal from Chile/Great Britain, Dark Embrace from Spain, Krisiun from Brazil as well as Mantic Ritual and Solace of Requiem from the USA recording with him.

=== Richthofen and Seelenwalzer ===
In 1997, Classen was founding member, songwriter, producer and guitarist with the German industrial metal band Richthofen. After objections by the Richthofen family, the band was legally required to drop the name and Richthofen disbanded in 1999.

In 2019, Classen and musicians of the original Richthofen band founded the band Seelenwalzer referencing the name of Richthofens first album. The debut album Totgeglaubt – German for "presumed dead" – was released by Massacre Records in May 2019.

== Charts ==
In 2003, Die Apokalyptischen Reiter's Have a Nice Trip was the first album produced by Andy Classen to enter the charts, reaching number 95 in Germany.

Since 2007, Legion of the Damned from the Netherlands have been able to chart regularly with Andy Classen-produced albums in Germany. Sons of the Jackal reached number 54 and in the following year, 2008, they even charted twice, reaching number 70 with Feel The Blade (and number 64 in Austria) and number 60 with Cult of the Dead.

Austrians Belphegor also charted in 2008 (with Bondage Goat Zombie) and 2009 (with Walpurgis Rites – Hexenwahn), reaching number 99 and 81 in Germany and even number 42 and 60 in Austria.

== Credits ==
Year	Artist	Album	Recordedcripp	Mixed	Mastered
1990	Howlin' Mad	Insanity	•	•	
1991	Holy Moses	Terminal Terror	•	•	
1991	Incubator	Symphonies of Spiritual Cannibalism	•	•	
1991	Jumpin' Jesus	The Art of Crucifying	•	•	
1992	Deathrow	Life Beyond	•	•	
1992	Holy Moses	Reborn Dogs	•	•	
1992	Holy Moses	Too Drunk to Fuck	•	•	
1992	Incubator	McGillroy the Housefly	•	•	
1992	Obscenity	Suffocated Truth	•	•	
1992	Polluted Inheritance	Ecocide	•	•	
1993	Incubator	Hirnnektar	•	•	
1993	Warpath	Massive	•	•	
1993	Warpath	When War Begins... Truth Disappears	•	•	
1994	Asphyx	Asphyx	•	•	•
1994	Brightside	Face the Truth	•	•	
1994	Holy Moses	No Matter What's the Cause	•	•	
1994	Ryker's	Brother Against Brother	•	•	
1994	Warpath	Against Everyone	•	•	
1995	Approach to Concrete	...failures?	•	•	
1995	Belphegor	The Last Supper	•	•	•
1995	Brightside	Punchline	•	•	
1995	Lunar	Lunar		•	•
1995	Ryker's	First Blood	•	•	
1995	Sanctimonium	Pathetique: The Beryllian Throne	•	•	
1995	Sleeping Gods	Above and Beyond	•	•	
1996	Brightside	No Policy	•	•	
1996	Crack Up	Blood is Life	•	•	
1996	Croon	Just	•	•	•
1996	Rotting Christ	Triarchy of the Lost Lovers	•	•	•
1996	Ryker's	Ground Zero	•	•	
1996	Ryker's	Low Life EP	•	•	
1996	Shit for Brains	Vortex Cordis	•	•	
1997	Burden of Grief	Haunting Requiems	•	•	
1997	Burden of Grief	Above Twilight Wings	•	•	•
1997	Crack Up	From the Ground	•	•	
1997	Disbelief	Disbelief	•	•	•
1997	Mis.Divine	Angsttriaden	•	•	•
1997	Nagelfar	Hünengrab im Herbst	•	•	•
1997	Richthofen	Seelenwalzer	•	•	•
1997	Ryker's	A Lesson In Loyalty	•	•	
1997	Ryker's	Cold Lost Sick EP	•	•	
1997	Surface	To Millenium... and Beyond	•	•	•
1998	Brightside	Bulletproof	•	•	•
1998	Crack Up	Heads Will Roll	•	•	•
1998	Disbelief	Infected	•	•	•
1998	Drecksau	Brecher	•	•	
1998	Eisregen	Krebskolonie	•	•	
1998	Nagelfar	Srontgorrth	•	•	•
1998	Niederschlag	Scrotum	•	•	
1998	Waylander	Reawakening Pride Once Lost	•	•	•
1999	Drecksau	Schmerz	•	•	
1999	Kadath	Cruel!	•	•	•
1999	Path of Debris	The Eyes of the Basilisk	•	•	•
1999	Ryker's	Life is a Gamble	•	•	
1999	Suidakra	Lays From Afar	•	•	•
1999	Temple of the Absurd	Mother, Creator, God	•		
1999	Zonata	Tunes of Steel	•	•	•
2000	Anfall	Feuer, Eis & Energie	•	•	•
2000	Blue Valentine	Seelen Taetowierung	•	•	•
2000	Crack Up	Dead End Run	•	•	
2000	Die Apokalyptischen Reiter	All You Need Is Love	•	•	•
2000	Dogma IVS	Dunkelheit und Licht	•	•	•
2000	Final Breath	Flash Burnt Crucifixes	•	•	•
2000	Krisiun	Conquerors of Armageddon	•	•	•
2000	Mindfield	Deviant	•	•	•
2000	Ryker's	From the Cradle to the Grave	•	•	
2000	Suidakra	The Arcanum	•	•	•
2001	Brightside	True Force	•	•	•
2001	Burden of Grief	On Darker Trails	•	•	•
2001	Callenish Circle	My Passion // Your Pain	•	•	•
2001	Dark at Dawn	Crimson Frost	•	•	•
2001	Disbelief	Worst Enemy	•	•	•
2001	Holy Moses	Master of Disaster	•	•	•
2001	Nagelfar	Virus West	•	•	•
2001	Rebaelliun	Annihilation	•	•	•
2001	Semen Datura	This Love is Dead	•	•	•
2001	Sleeping Gods	Regenerated	•	•	
2002	Dark Age	The Silent Republic	•	•	•
2002	Dew Scented	Inwards	•	•	•
2002	Final Breath	Mind Explosion	•	•	•
2002	Holy Moses	Disorder of the Order	•	•	•
2002	Mourning Caress	Imbalance	•	•	•
2002	Rotting Christ	Genesis	•	•	
2002	Suidakra	Emprise to Avalon	•	•	•
2002	Tankard	B-Day	•	•	
2003	Callenish Circle	Flesh Power Dominion	•	•	•
2003	Dew Scented	Ill-Natured & Innoscent			•
2003	Dew Scented	Impact	•	•	•
2003	Die Apokalyptischen Reiter	Have a Nice Trip	•	•	•
2003	Disbelief	Spreading the Rage	•	•	•
2003	Graveworm	Engraved In Black	•	•	•
2003	Mindfield	Below	•	•	
2003	Suidakra	Signs for the Fallen	•	•	•
2003	The Old Dead Tree	The Nameless Disease	•	•	•
2003	Vollrausch	Wirkstoff: Adrenalin	•	•	
2004	Blow Job	Unboned		•	•
2004	Dementor	God Defamer	•	•	•
2004	Dies Ater	Out of the Dark	•	•	•
2004	Final Breath	Let Me Be Your Tank	•	•	•
2004	Occult	Elegy for the Weak	•	•	•
2004	Path of Golconda	Destination: Downfall	•	•	•
2004	Reckless Tide	Repent Or Seal Your Fate			•
2004	Tankard	Beast of Bourbon	•	•	•
2005	Criminal	Sicaro	•	•	•
2005	Dew Scented	Issue VI	•	•	•
2005	Graveworm	(N)utopia	•	•	•
2005	Legion of the Damned	Malevolent Rapture	•	•	•
2005	Neaera	The Rising Tide of Oblivion	•	•	•
2005	President Evil	Evil Goes to Hollywood	•	•	•
2005	Sencirow	Perception of Fear	•	•	•
2005	Spellbound	Incoming Destiny	•	•	•
2005	The Old Dead Tree	The Perpetual Motion	•	•	•
2006	Belphegor	Pestapokalypse VI	•	•	•
2006	Clobberin Time	The Dawn of a Dying Race	•	•	•
2006	Death Will Score	From the Ashes	•	•	•
2006	Dos Dias De Sangre	Bound By Honor / Mini CD	•	•	•
2006	Drone	Head-On Collision	•	•	•
2006	Edgecrusher	Forever Failure	•	•	•
2006	Krisiun	AssassiNation	•	•	•
2006	My Darkest Hate	Combat Area	•	•	•
2006	Path of Golconda	The Threshold Diaries	•	•	•
2006	President Evil	The Trash'n'Roll Asshole Show	•	•	•
2006	Shorts & Churchbells	Reason to Complain		•	•
2006	Sinister	Afterburner	•	•	•
2006	Sniper	Seducer of Human Souls		•	•
2006	Tankard	The Beauty and the Beer	•	•	•
2007	Ancient Existence	Hate is the Law	•	•	•
2007	Cripper	Freak Inside			•
2007	Dark Embrace	The Rebirth of Darkness	•	•	•
2007	Dies Ater	Odiums Spring	•	•	•
2007	Graveworm	Collateral Defect	•	•	•
2007	Inzest	Grotesque New World	•	•	•
2007	Legion of the Damned	Sons of the Jackal	•	•	•
2007	Nine XI	The Opening	•	•	•
2007	Requiem	Premier Killing League	•	•	•
2007	Revolting Breed	Rise Against		•	•
2007	Solace of Requiem	Utopia Reborn			•
2007	Spellbound	Nemesis 2665	•	•	•
2007	Tankard	Best Case Scenario: 25 Years in Beers	•	•	•
2007	The Old Dead Tree	The Water Fields	•	•	•
2007	Tough Motion	Delta	•	•	•
2008	Aavas	Sepulcretum	•	•	•
2008	Belphegor	Bondage Goat Zombie	•	•	•
2008	Daksinroy	Dystopia	•	•	•
2008	Davidian	Hear Their Cries	•	•	•
2008	Grave Desecrator	Sign of Doom			•
2008	Hatred	Madhouse Symphonies			•
2008	Krisiun	Southern Storm	•	•	•
2008	Legion of the Damned	Cult of the Dead	•	•	•
2008	Legion of the Damned	Feel The Blade	•	•	•
2008	Mindead	Abandon All Hope			•
2008	Morpheus	Extermination of the Dominant Species			•
2008	Postmortem	Constant Hate			•
2008	President Evil	Hell in a Box			•
2008	Prostitute Disfigurement	Descendants of Depravity	•	•	•
2008	Sencirow	The Nightmare Within	•	•	•
2008	Sniper	Your World is Doomed		•	•
2008	Subterfuge Carver	Deathcore		•	•
2008	Thytopia	Bleeding Earth			•
2009	Archgoat	The Light-Devouring Darkness			•
2009	Arckanum	11 Thorns			•
2009	Belphegor	Walpurgis Rites – Hexenwahn	•	•	•
2009	Cryptic Wintermoon	Fear			•
2009	Damned Creed	Enslaved Thoughts		•	•
2009	Distorted Impalement	Bodyslam		•	•
2009	Graveworm	Diabolical Figures	•	•	•
2009	Hyades	The Roots of Trash		•	•
2009	Insanity Reigns Supreme	Occultus Insanus Damnatus	•	•	•
2009	Maithungh	Lust in the Kingdom of God			•
2009	Mantic Ritual	Executioner	•	•	•
2009	Mastic Scum	Dust			•
2009	Misticia	Sickness of the Earth		•	•
2009	Mor Dagor	Mk. IV	•	•	•
2009	Pandemia	Feet of Anger	•	•	•
2009	Path of Golconda	Return	•	•	•
2009	Punish	Raptus	•	•	•
2009	Requiem	Infiltrate... Obliterate... Dominate...	•	•	•
2009	Shadows Far	As Black Turns Red		•	•
2008	Tankard	Thirst	•	•	•
2009	VeiL	Blinkers Define the Spasm			•
2010	Deafness by Noise	Aim to Please	•	•	•
2010	Debt of Nature	Crush, Kill and Burn		•	•
2010	Disbelief	Heal			•
2010	Legen Beltza	Need to Suffer			•
2010	Malignant Tumour	Earthshaker	•	•	•
2010	Neaera	Forging the Eclipse	•		
2010	Obszoen Geschoepf	Symphony of Decay	•	•	•
2010	Odium	Stop My Anger		•	•
2010	Punish My Heaven	First Punishment	•	•	•
2010	Refugium	Unknown			•
2010	Sentimentalistic Bitches	Down Below			•
2010	Singstars of Death	The Pink Album		•	•
2010	Solace of Requiem	The Great Awakening	•	•	•
2010	Spheron	To Dissect Paper		•	•
2010	Unholy Ritual	Finis Origine Pendet		•	•
2010	Varg	Blutaar	•	•	•
2011	Desecrated Sphere	The Unmasking Reality		•	•
2011	Kaerbholz	100 Prozent		•	•
2011	Requiem	Within Darkened Disorder	•	•	•
2011	Varg	Wolfskult	•	•	•
2011	Brainscan	Breaking Down Your Mind		•	•
2011	Krisiun	The Great Execution	•	•	•
2011	Theodicy	Diary of War		•	•
2011	Transnight	The Dark Half			•
2012	Seven Ends	To the Worms		•	•
2012	Taina	Illusion		•	•
2012	Algebra	Polymorph		•	•
2013	Malignant Tumour	Overdose & Overdrive	•	•	•
2013	Violator	"Scenarios of Brutality"	•	•	•
2014	Ryker's	Hard To The Core	•	•	•
2015	Hyades	The Wolves Are Getting Hungry	•	•	•
2016	Malignant Tumor	"The Mentalist"	•	•	•
2017	Corporal Jigsore	"Unleashing the Pestilence"		•	•
2017	Ritual Decay	"Devila Grantha"		•	•
2018	Krisiun	"Scourge of the Enthrones"	•	•	•
2019	Legion of the Damned	"Slaves of the Shadow Realm"	•	•	•
2019	Seelenwalzer	"Totgeglaubt"	•	•	•
