= Issue =

Issue or issues may refer to:

== Publishing ==
- Issue (company), a mobile publishing company
- Issue (magazine), a monthly Korean comics anthology magazine
- Issue (periodicals), a number to indicate a particular periodical
- Issue (postal service), a stamp or a series of stamps released to the public
- Issues (American Council for Judaism), a Jewish magazine
- Issues in Science and Technology a public policy peer reviewed journal pertaining to science, engineering, and medicine

== Computers ==
- Issue (computers), a unit of work to accomplish an improvement in a data system
  - Issue tracking system, a computer software package that manages and maintains lists of bugs, etc.
- Issue log, a documentation element of software project management

== Music ==
- Issues (band), a metalcore band from Atlanta, Georgia
  - Issues (Issues album), 2014
- Issues (Korn album), 1999
- Issues, a 2000 R&B album by Somethin' for the People
- Issue VI, a 2005 thrash metal album by Dew-Scented
- "Issues" (Escape the Fate song), 2010
- "Issues" (The Saturdays song), 2008
- "Issues" (Julia Michaels song), 2017
- "Issues", a song by Mindless Self Indulgence from the 2008 album If
- "Issues", a song by Baby Keem from the 2021 album The Melodic Blue
- Is:sue, a Japanese girl group under Lapone Entertainment

== Television ==
- Issues with Jane Velez-Mitchell, a nightly TV newscast on HLN
- Issues and Answers, a 1960–1981 American TV news program

== Other uses ==
- Issue (genealogy), a legal term for a person's descendants
- Social issue, a matter that influences individuals within a society
- Environmental issue, an effect of human activity on the environment
- Issuer, a legal entity that develops, registers and sells securities
- Mudda – The Issue, a 2003 Indian film

== See also ==
- Isshu, a former province of Japan, now part of Nagasaki Prefecture
- Issue date (disambiguation)
- issuu, an electronic publishing platform
- List of global issues
