= Henrik Karlsson (disambiguation) =

Henrik Karlsson (born 1983) is a Swedish-Kazakhstani former ice hockey goaltender.

Henrik Karls(s)on, Carls(s)on or Carlsen may also refer to:

- Henrik Karlsson (musicologist) (born 1940), Swedish musicologist
- Henrik Carlsson, guitarist in Zonata
- Henrik Carlsen, musician
- Henrik Kurt Carlsen, Danish sea captain

== See also ==
- Henrik (disambiguation)
- Karlsson (disambiguation)
