= Ravenous Plague =

Studio album by Legion of the Damned
- Released: 3 January 2014
- Recorded: 3–29 March 2013 at Stage One Studio, Buhne, Germany
- Genres: Thrash metal, death metal
- Length: 45:01
- Label: Napalm
- Producers: Legion of the Damned, Andy Classen

Legion of the Damned chronology
Descent into Chaos (2011)	Ravenous Plague (2014)	Slaves of the Shadow Realm (2019)

Ravenous Plague is the sixth studio album by Dutch extreme metal band Legion of the Damned. It was released on 3 January 2014 through Napalm Records.

== Track listing ==
No.	Title	Length
1.	"The Apocalyptic Surge" (Instrumental)	1:23
2.	"Howling for Armageddon"	4:15
3.	"Black Baron"	4:14
4.	"Mountain Wolves Under a Crescent Moon"	4:23
5.	"Ravenous Abominations"	5:42
6.	"Doom Priest"	4:46
7.	"Summon All Hate"	4:19
8.	"Morbid Death"	3:47
9.	"Bury Me in a Nameless Grave"	4:27
10.	"Armalite Assassin"	3:43
11.	"Strike of the Apocalypse"	4:02
Total length:		45:01

Limited edition bonus disc
No.	Title	Length
1.	"Making of "Doom Priest" video"
2.	"Making of "Ravenous Plague""
3.	"Interview with Tony "Skullcrusher" Manero (Lyricist)"
4.	"South American tour report"
5.	"Mountain Wolves Under a Crescent Moon (video)"

== Personnel ==
Legion of the Damned

- Twan van Geel - guitars
- Harold Gielen - bass
- Maurice Swinkels - vocals
- Erik Fleuren - drums

Guest musicians

- Jo Blankenburg - Everything on "The Apocalyptic Surge"
- Hein Willekens - Solo guitar on "Morbid Death"

Production

- Wes Benscoter - cover art
- Stefan Heilemann photography
- Wouter Wagemans - artwork, design
- Andy Classen - production, mixing
