= Descent into Chaos =

Descent into Chaos may refer to:

- Descent into Chaos (Nightrage album), 2005
- Descent into Chaos (Legion of the Damned album), 2011
- Descent into Chaos: The United States and the Failure of Nation Building... Book by Ahmed Rashid 2008, ISBN 978-0-670-01970-0
- Descent into Chaos: The doomed expedition to Low's Gully... book by Richard Connaughton 1996, ISBN 1-85753-147-7
