= Solace of Requiem =

US musical group

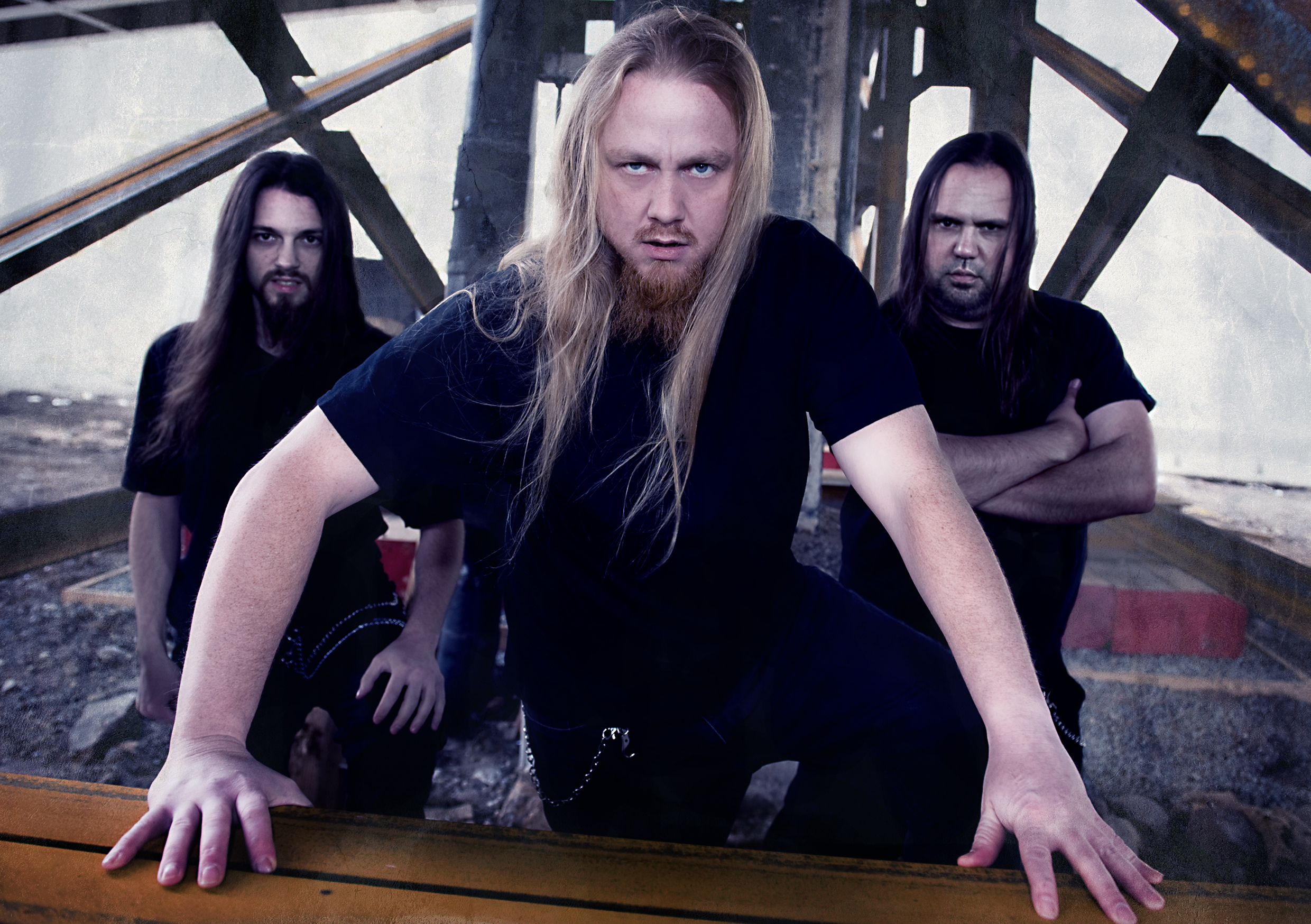
- Solace of Requiem from left to right, Dave Tedesco, Jeff Sumrell, Richard Gulczynski

Background information
- Origin: Virginia Beach, Virginia, USA
- Genres: Technical death metal, blackened death metal, extreme metal
- Years active: 2001–present
- Label: ViciSolum Productions
- Members: Jeff Sumrell; Dave Tedesco; Richard Gulczynski
- Website: www.solreq.com

Solace of Requiem is an extreme metal band originally from Virginia Beach, Virginia. The group formed in 2001 with traditional death metal roots but began combining elements of technical death metal and black metal by the time of their 2010 release. Their 2014 album, Casting Ruin, is often referred to as part of the subgenre known as technical blackened death metal.

== Sound ==
Considered a mix of technical death metal, black metal, and brutal death metal with most caveats the genre normally has to offer, including extreme vocals, the normal barrage of blast beats and abundant double bass drumming, as well as guitar-work with sweep picking and arpeggios. However, the band has also integrated the study of binaural audio into the structures of their songs, which gives them an augmented sound and odd compositional structure. This is not to say that they have changed the frequencies of their music, rather that they have applied this knowledge to compose highly poly-rhythmic structures within their songs. Both guitars are being hard panned to their own speaker respectively, so listening to only one speaker gives the impression of a different song as opposed to listening to the piece as a whole. The band also structures their music similarly to the way classical music was written, lending a neoclassical feel to their sound. They blend together technical instrumentation with a mix of things including classical passages, doom riffs, midi instruments, and an overall dark ambiance.

== Lyrics ==
The lyrics have their basic roots in philosophy, typically very dark in essence. Themes include expressions of hatred, brutality, psychology, hopelessness, and secular minded philosophy based on scientific principles. The style is often poetic, and presented with rotating perspectives.

== History ==
=== Formation and self-titled album (2001–2005) ===
The initial lineup of Solace of Requiem (Jeff Sumrell, Chris Young, and Luke Downing) began under the moniker Sarcophagus when they were just teenagers in 1990. They took hiatus in 1993, and it wasn't until 2001 that they reunited under the name Solace of Requiem. In 2004 they recorded their first full length (self-titled) album which featured the cover song "I Need You" by Grave (from their Soulless album), after permissions were granted by Century Media Records. The self titled album was recorded at Master Sound Studio in Virginia Beach, VA. The album attained international distribution in 2004 and a video was eventually produced for the song "Beyond Grace". It was at this time that the band stopped playing exclusively in Virginia, and started booking tours which took them to other parts of the US.

=== Utopia Reborn (2005–2006) ===
Following the release of the self titled album, Solace of Requiem had plans to record new material which they had been working on all year. Considering their budget was limited, they decided to mail their self-titled album out to try and secure a record deal. This eventually lead to the band singing with German record label Ruptured Silence Records later in 2005. Luke Downing, the drummer at the time, decided he wanted to pursue another line of work full time, leaving Solace of Requiem to recruit a new drummer. They then hired session drummer Joe Walmer from Pennsylvania's Aletheian so they could begin working on their new album. Jeff, Chris, and Joe recorded Solace of Requiem's second full length album, Utopia Reborn at Worlds End Studio in January 2006 in Kall, Germany. Also appearing on Utopia Reborn (as a guest vocalist) would be Brett Hoffman most commonly known for his work with Malevolent Creation. Utopia Reborn would then be released later that year, garnering nonlocal and even international attention, as well as features in prominent magazines of the time Metal Maniacs and Decibel.

=== The Great Awakening (2006–2010) ===
Soon after the release of Utopia Reborn, Solace of Requiem decided it was best to part ways with Ruptured Silence Records. During this period, Chris Young felt he could no longer continue on with the band. Joe Walmer's band Aletheian also received a record deal which led him to pursue that project full time. Jeff Sumrell decided to continue on and planned an American tour, a video shoot for the song "Red Sea", and a European tour. At this point drummer Dave Tedesco (NJ) was recruited, as well as guitarist Aaron Lott (MN). Lott only ended up doing the first tour and was then replaced by guitarist Jesse Bartlett (NY) for the video and the European tour. After the tour though, Bartlett left the band and Sumrell was forced to yet again find a guitarist, this time one who would be willing to record the new album he had been writing for some time. So in 2007, Chris Armijo (CA) joined Solace of Requiem and they began as a unit preparing for the studio. The Great Awakening would be recorded later in 2007 with producer Andy Classen at Stage One Studio in Germany, and the band did a three-week tour following its recording. They spent approximately two years looking for a proper label to release the album, but after not receiving any adequate offers, they released The Great Awakening on their own in 2010. This album was a big changing point for the sound of the band. They transitioned from more of a mid-paced, melodic yet heavy sound, to a strictly tech-death sound performing at very high BPMs with a bit of a black metal influence. Though not receiving any help from a label, the band still managed to use its new sound and past resources to gain publicity and reach out to a new audience who met The Great Awakening with some high-quality reviews.

=== Touring and lineup changes (2008–2012) ===
For the next few years the band would not record an album, though this did not stop them from touring every year. At this time period (2008), due to the new music being much more polyrhythmic, they hired a second guitar player named George Arguello (CA). Upon hiring George they travelled out to the midwest for a tour, and prepared for the winter when they would tour Europe again with their full lineup. In January the band then began the Only Death is For Nothing tour with Austria's Lost Dreams and Moshquito from Germany. In 2010, accompanying the release of The Great Awakening they toured with veteran Florida death metal act Resurrection, known as the Resurrected in Europe tour. As 2011 came, George Arguello would quit performing live guitarist duties, leading Solace of Requiem to hire Richard Gulczynski (PA). Gulczynski was known as the touring bass player for Decapitated and is also currently a guitarist for Single Bullet Theory. The band then embarked on a 24 date European tour named the No End to Suffering tour, opening for Vomitory and Prostitute Disfigurement. They also toured for one week beforehand with German group Disbelief on the Believe in Nothing tour.

=== Casting Ruin (2012–present) ===
In 2012 Solace of Requiem stayed fairly stagnant, playing only a few shows. At this point they had been writing music and decided it was time to get back to the studio to record their fourth full length album, however Chris Armijo decided he would no longer be a part of the band. This left Jeff, Dave, and Richard alone to prepare heavily for the session that was to come and to focus on the sound they wanted to achieve. They decided to use Erik Rutan's Mana Recording Studio in St. Petersburg, Florida and hired Brian Elliott as the producer in February 2013. They titled the album Casting Ruin and allowed Brian to do the recording, mixing, and mastering. Later that year they embarked on a smaller European tour, which marked the arrival of touring guitarist Kevin Heiderich to the lineup. After the tour they signed a record deal with ViciSolum Productions for the release of Casting Ruin. It was released publicly on August 29, 2014. The band also self-produced a music video for their track "Soiling The Fields of Putridity" which was released around the same time as the album. Critics familiar with the band considered Casting Ruin the bands finest work. It was reviewed by the prominent metal webzine Metalsucks as well as featured in Zero Tolerance and Terrorizer magazines. Further down the road in 2014, the band embarked on a European tour as direct support of Ulcerate and Wormed.

== Members ==
=== Current members ===
- Jeff Sumrell – vocals, bass guitar, main composer (2001–present)
- Dave Tedesco – drums (2006–present)
- Richard Gulczynski – lead, rhythm guitars (2011–present)

=== Former members ===
==== Guitar ====
- Chris Young (2001–2006)
- Chris Armijo (2007–2011)

==== Drums ====
- Luke Downing (2001–2005)
- Joe Walmer (2005–2006)

=== Live members ===
==== Guitar ====
- Jesse Bartlett (2006)
- Aaron Lott (2006)
- George Arguello (2008–2011)
- Kevin Heiderich (2013–2014)

== Discography ==
Album Title	Details	Label
Solace of Requiem (S/T)	10 tracks, total time: 47:08; Released 2004; Recorded at Master Sound Studio, Virginia	Self Released
Utopia Reborn	9 tracks, total time: 43:36; Released 2006; Recorded at Worlds End Studio, Germany	Ruptured Silence Records
The Great Awakening	9 tracks, total time: 29:45; Released 2010; Produced by Andy Classen; Recorded at Stage One Studio, Germany	Self Released
Casting Ruin	9 tracks, total time: 44:38; Released 2014; Produced by Brian Elliott; Recorded at Mana Studios, St. Petersburg, Florida	ViciSolum Productions
