= Executioner (disambiguation) =

An executioner is an officer of the court who carries out capital punishment sentences.

Executioner may also refer to:

- "The Executioner", a painting by 17th-century Spanish Tenebrist painter Jusepe de Ribera

== Literature ==
=== Comics ===
- Executioner (character), a Marvel Comics supervillain
- Executioner (DC Comics), different DC Comics supervillains

=== Novels ===
- The Executioners (Moore novel), a 1951 novel by Brian Moore
- The Executioners (MacDonald novel), a 1957 novel by John D. MacDonald
- The Executioner (French: Le Bourreau), a 1961 novel by Pierre Boulle
- The Executioners, a 1967 novel by John Creasey
- The Executioner (book series), a series of novels running since 1969 featuring the character Mack Bolan
- The Executioners (Killmaster novel), a 1971 Nick Carter novel
- Executioner, a 2002 World of Darkness novel by Gherbod Fleming, the sixth volume in the Predator & Prey series, spun off from the tabletop game Hunter: The Reckoning
- The Executioner (Kisyov novel), a 2003 novel by Stefan Kisyov about the killer of Bulgarian dissident writer Georgi Markov

=== Essays ===
- The Executioner (de Maistre) - a meditation by Joseph de Maistre on the importance of the executioner in maintaining order

== Film ==
- Executioners (film), a 1993 film by Johnny To and Ching Siu-tung
- The Executioner (1963 film) or El verdugo, a Luis García Berlanga film
- The Executioner (1970 film) a film directed by Sam Wanamaker starring George Peppard
- The Executioner (1975 film), a 1975 South Korean film
- Executioner (1974 film), a 1974 film starring Sonny Chiba
- The Executioner, a 1978 film also known as Massacre Mafia Style
- Permission to Kill, a 1975 film also known as The Executioner

== Television ==
=== Characters ===
- Nathaniel Barnes / Executioner, a Gotham character (seasons 2–3, 2015–2017)

=== Episodes ===
- "Executioner", Brimstone episode 6 (1998)
- "Executioner", Crossing Lines season 3, episode 6 (2015)
- "Executioner", Digimon Ghost Game episode 13 (2022)
- "Executioner", Gunsmoke season 2, episode 19 (1957)
- "Executioner", Law & Order season 18, episode 9 (2008)
- "The Executioner", Alcoa Presents One Step Beyond season 3, episode 15 (1961)
- "The Executioner", Fabian of Scotland Yard episode 19 (1955)
- "The Executioner", Gotham season 3, episode 9 (2016)
- "The Executioner", Jigsaw John episode 10 (1976)
- "The Executioner", Kindred Spirits season 2, episode 5 (2017)
- "The Executioner", M Squad season 2, episode 11 (1958)
- "The Executioner", Manhunt (1959) season 2, episode 16 (1960)
- "The Executioner", Monarca season 2, episode 8 (2021)
- "The Executioner", Play for Today series 10, episode 27 (1980)
- "The Executioner", The Executioner and Her Way of Life episode 1 (2022)
- "The Executioner", The Rebel (American) season 2, episode 40 (1961)
- "The Executioner", The Rifleman season 2, episode 32 (1962)
- "The Executioner", The Wednesday Play season 4, episode 22 (1966)
- "The Executioners", Crane series 1, episode 5 (1963)
- "The Executioners", Dixon of Dock Green series 13, episode 4 (1966)
- "The Executioners", Doctor Who season 2, episode 30; episode 1 of The Chase (1965)
- "The Executioners", Spyder's Web episode 2 (1972)
- "The Executioners: Part 1", The F.B.I. season 2, episode 25 (1967)
- "The Executioners: Part 2", The F.B.I. season 2, episode 26 (1967)
- "The Executioners", The Virginian season 1, episode 1 (1962)

=== Shows ===
- The Executioner (TV series) a 2015 television drama produced by TVB

== Sports ==
- The Executioners (professional wrestling), the name of several WWE tag teams
- Buddy Rose or The Executioner, American wrestler
- Terry Gordy or The Executioner, wrestler
- Bernard Hopkins or The Executioner, American boxer

== Music ==
- Executioner (album), a 2009 album by Mantic Ritual
- Executioner (band), a thrash metal band from Boston
- The X-Ecutioners, American turntablist group
- "The Executioner", a 2025 single by Avery Cochrane

== See also ==
- Executor (disambiguation)
