= Take Me Along (disambiguation) =

Take Me Along is a 1959 musical

Take Me Along may also refer to:

- "Take Me Along", a song by Callenish Circle from Flesh Power Dominion
- "Take Me Along", a song by Miley Cyrus from Can't Be Tamed
- "Take Me Along", a song by Nick St. Nicholas
