= Mantic Ritual =

American thrash metal band

- Also known as: Meltdown
- Origin: Pittsburgh, Pennsylvania, U.S.
- Genres: Thrash metal, heavy metal
- Years active: 2004–2011, 2013, 2020–present
- Label: Nuclear Blast
- Members: Dan Wetmore; Ben Mottsman; Jeff Potts; Carlos Cruz
- Past members: Adam Haritan; Dave Watson
- Website: manticritual.com

Mantic Ritual (formerly Meltdown) is an American thrash metal band from Pittsburgh, Pennsylvania. They released their only album, Executioner, in 2009.

== History ==
=== Origin (2004–2007) ===
As Meltdown, Mantic Ritual wrote and recorded music in Pittsburgh, Pennsylvania, around 2004. After adding guitarist Jeff Potts, the band moved to Hollywood, California, in 2007 and signed with Nuclear Blast.

=== Executioner, departure of Dan Wetmore (2008–2009) ===
The band abandoned the name Meltdown citing legal reasons and to avoid confusion with other bands using the name. The band renamed themselves Mantic Ritual and moved back to Pittsburgh, participating in national tours with bands including Rotting Christ and Destruction.

The band recorded their debut album, Executioner, with producer Andy Classen (Dew-Scented, Rotting Christ) at Stage-one Studios in Borgentreich, Germany. It was released in Europe on February 27, 2009 and in the US on March 10, 2009.

On September 15, 2009, six months after the US release of Executioner, Mantic Ritual announced through their MySpace that guitarist/vocalist Dan Wetmore was leaving the band to pursue photography. Wetmore said that he enjoyed playing and writing music but could not see himself spending life on the road. In the same announcement, Mantic Ritual stated that Grave Desire frontman Dave Watson would fill in for Wetmore as a temporary replacement for the September/October 2009 shows. Within a few weeks, Watson became the permanent guitarist/vocalist for Mantic Ritual.

=== Breakup and one-off reunion (2010–2020) ===
Mantic Ritual announced in August 2010 that drummer Adam Haritan had left the band. The news was released on the band's Facebook page, and on metalunderground's website. The reason for Haritan's departure was described as mutual, due to Haritan's loss of interest in playing music full-time. After more than a year of silence from the band, Guitarist Jeff Potts was asked by the website Metalsucks.net for an update on Mantic Ritual's status. He said during the interview that he and bassist Ben Mottsman had relocated to Los Angeles, while vocalist Dave Watson had not.

"This is a really long-winded way of saying that Mantic Ritual is finished", Potts said during the interview. As of May 2012, Potts is working on a power metal project. Mottsman and Potts joined thrash metal band Warbringer.

In 2013, the band reformed for a one-off show at Thrash de Mayo, with original singer/guitarist Dan Wetmore along with Warbringer's Carlos Cruz filling in on drums.

=== Comeback and Heart Set Stone EP (2021–present) ===
By 2021, Mantic Ritual had once again reformed, featuring the same as lineup as their temporary reunion from 2013: Dan Wetmore (vocals, guitars), Jeff Potts (guitars), Ben Mottsman (bass) and Carlos Cruz (drums). It was announced on August 2, 2021, that the band had signed to M-Theory Audio and would release their first album in 13 years in 2022. In June 2022, the band announced their upcoming release would be an EP titled Heart Set Stone, which was released on September 2.

== Discography ==
Studio albums

- Executioner (2009)

EPs

- Heart Set Stone (2022)
