= Crógacht =

Studio album by Suidakra
- Released: February 20, 2009 (Germany); February 23, 2009 (Europe); March 3, 2009 (USA)
- Recorded: Gernhart Records Studio, November 10, 2008 - November 30, 2008
- Genre: Melodic death metal
- Length: 41:13
- Label: SPV; Wacken Records

Suidakra chronology
Caledonia (2006)	Crógacht (2009)	Book of Dowth (2011)

Professional ratings
Review scores
Source	Rating
AMG	4/5 stars
Metalrage	9/10 stars
About.com	4/5 stars

Crógacht is the ninth studio album by the German melodic death metal band Suidakra. This album features a greater Celtic sound and theme than earlier works. In particular, it builds on the sound formed in the previous album, Caledonia, notably through the additional introduction of a sixteen-member choir as well as traditional instruments, such as the tin whistle, banjo, in addition to the bagpipe featured in both albums. Contrasting these new influences, Crógacht maintains the well-grounded melodic death sound that SuidAkrA began with in earlier albums.

== Release history and tour activity ==
Crógacht was recorded and mixed between 10 November 2008 and 30 November 2008 by Martin Buchwalter at Gernhart Recording Studio in Siegburg, Germany. The album was released on February 20, 2009, in Germany, and on 3 March 2009 in the United States. In early 2009, SuidAkrA supported its release on a North American tour.

== Concept and storyline ==
"Crógacht", the Irish word for bravery, is based in its entirety on the Irish folktale, Aided Óenfhir Aífe. It tells the story of the hero Cuchulainn’s journey to the Hebridean island of Skye, where he seeks to learn the arts of war from the Scythian warrior woman Scáthach. The decisions he then has to make set the events in motion that will lead up to his son Conlaoch’s tragic fate.

== Track listing ==
1. "Slán" – 1:49
2. "Conlaoch" – 5:18
3. "Isle of Skye" – 6:00
4. "Scáthach" – 5:09
5. "Feats of War" – 2:47
6. "Shattering Swords" – 4:15
7. "Ár Nasc Fola" – 3:02
8. "Gilded Oars" – 5:36
9. "Baile's Strand" – 7:20

== Personnel ==
Suidakra:

- Arkadius Antonik – vocals, guitars, keyboards, banjo
- Marcus Riewaldt – bass
- Lars Wehner – drums, backing vocals

Session/guest musicians:

- Axel Römer - bagpipes, tin whistle
- Tina Stabel - vocals on Feats of War
- Miriam Hensel - additional guest vocals on Shattering Swords
- Sebastian Hintz - backing vocals

Other staff:

- Martin Buchwalter – mixing
- Kris Verwimp - lyrics, cover artwork, album concept
