= Feel the Blade =

Studio album by Legion of the Damned
- Released: 4 January 2008
- Recorded: Stage One Studio in Germany
- Genre: Thrash metal, death metal
- Length: 37:44
- Label: Massacre
- Producer: Andy Classen

Legion of the Damned chronology
Sons of the Jackal (2007)	Feel the Blade (2008)	Cult of the Dead (2008)

Feel the Blade is a 2008 album by thrash metal/death metal band Legion of the Damned. It is actually a re-release of Elegy for the Weak, originally released under the name of Occult, the prior incarnation of Legion of the Damned under singer Rachel Heyzer, and contains an altered track list. Lyrical topics on the album include horror motifs, the devastation of nuclear war and violent occult themes. Serial murder plays a more prominent role in this album than in later writings, with "Nocturnal Predator" about Richard Ramirez actually quoting the killer in the lyrics ("Lucifer dwells within us all"). The final bonus track is a cover of a Pestilence song (guest appearance by Martin van Drunen).

== Track listing ==
1. "Nuclear Torment" – 3:44
2. "Nocturnal Predator" – 4:12
3. "Slaughtering the Pigs" – 4:20
4. "Slut of Sodom" – 3:46
5. "Feel the Blade" – 4:19
6. "Expire" – 2:24
7. "Warbeast" – 2:58
8. "Disturbing the Dead" – 3:27
9. "Obsessed by the Grave" – 5:13
10. "Reaper's Call" – 3:21
11. "Last Command"*
12. "Mask of Terror"*
13. "Chronic Infection (feat. Martin van Drunen)"*
- The songs 11–13 are bonus tracks.
- Chronic Infection is originally by Pestilence

== Personnel ==
- Maurice Swinkels – vocals
- Richard Ebisch – guitar
- Harold Gielen – bass
- Erik Fleuren – drums
