= Eternal Defiance =

Studio album by Suidakra
- Released: May 24th, 2013
- Genre: Melodic death metal
- Length: 45:08
- Label: AFM
- Producer: Martin Buchwalter

Suidakra chronology
Book of Dowth (2011)	Eternal Defiance (2013)

Eternal Defiance is the eleventh studio album by the German melodic death metal band Suidakra. It was released in 2013 on AFM Records.

== Track listing ==
1. "Storming the Walls" - 03:14.
2. "Inner Sanctum" - 05:08.
3. "Beneath the Red Eagle" - 04:51.
4. "March of Conquest" - 03:47.
5. "Pair Dadeni" - 03:49.
6. "The Mindsong" - 05:38.
7. "Rage for Revenge" - 04:51.
8. "Dragon's Head" - 05:24.
9. "Defiant Dreams" - 04:26.
10. "Damnatio Memoriae" - 04:06.
11. "Mrs. McGrath" - 05:14 (Japanese edition bonus track).
12. "Beneath the Red Eagle (Orchestral Version)" - 03:22 (Japanese edition bonus track).

== Personnel ==
- Arkadius Antonik - vocals, guitars, banjo, orchestral arrangements.
- Marius Pesch - guitars.
- Tim Siebrecht - bass.
- Lars Wehner - drums.

== Additional personnel ==
- Sebastian Hintz - backing vocals, acoustic guitar.
- Axel Römer - Highland bagpipes.
- Tina Stabel - female vocals, piano.
- Arne Gerits - violin.
- Kris Verwimp - cover art, lyrics, layout.
- Axel Jusseit - photography.
- Martin Buchwalter - producer, mixing, mastering.
