= Book of Dowth =

Studio album by Suidakra
- Released: March 25th, 2011
- Genre: Melodic death metal
- Length: 40:08
- Label: AFM
- Producer: Martin Buchwalter

Suidakra chronology
| Crógacht (2009) | Book of Dowth (2011) | Eternal Defiance (2013) |

Book of Dowth is the tenth studio album by the German melodic death metal band Suidakra. It was released in 2011 on AFM Records.

== Track listing ==
1. "Over Nine Waves" - 01:57
2. "Dowth 2059" - 04:38
3. "Battle-Cairns" - 03:36
4. "Biróg's Oath" - 04:18
5. "Mag Mell" - 03:19
6. "The Dark Mound" - 05:14
7. "Balor" - 04:41
8. "Stone of the Seven Suns" - 05:01
9. "Fury Fomoraigh" - 05:42
10. "Otherworlds Collide" - 01:42
11. "Rise of Taliesin" - 06:07 (classically re-arranged)*
12. "When Eternity Echoes" - 02:50 (classically re-arranged)*
13. "The Fall of Tara" - 04:22 (classically re-arranged)*
14. "Marooned" - 05:59 (Running Wild cover)*
- 11-14 are Japanese edition bonus tracks

== Personnel ==
- Arkadius Antonik - vocals, guitars, keyboards
- Marcus Riewaldt - bass
- Lars Wehner - drums, backing vocals

== Additional personnel ==
- Axel Römer - bagpipes
- Tina Stabel - female vocals
- Matthias Zimmer - vocals
- Sebastian Hintz - acoustic guitar
- Kris Verwimp - artwork, lyrics
- Martin Buchwalter - producer
