= Pitch.Black.Effects =

[Pitch.Black.Effects]

Studio album by Callenish Circle
- Released: 14 November 2005
- Genre: Melodic death metal
- Length: 43:22
- Label: Metal Blade
- Producer: Gail Liebling

Callenish Circle chronology
My Passion // Your Pain (2003)	[Pitch.Black.Effects] (2005)

Professional ratings
Review scores
Source	Rating
AllMusic	link

[Pitch.Black.Effects] is the fifth and final studio album by the Dutch melodic death metal band Callenish Circle.

== Track listing ==
1. "This Day You Regret" − 4:32
2. "Ignorant" − 4:20
3. "Behind Lines" − 3:36
4. "Schwarzes Licht" − 4:51
5. "Sweet Cyanide" − 4:31
6. "Blind" − 4:52
7. "Guess Again" − 4:01
8. "Self-Inflicted" − 5:50
9. "As You Speak" − 4:09
10. "Pitch Black" − 2:40

== Credits ==
=== Callenish Cicle ===
- Patrick Savelkoul − vocals
- Ronny Tyssen − guitar, mixing
- Remy Dieteren − guitar
- Ralph Roelvink − bass
- Gavin Harte − drums

=== Additional personnel ===
- Gail Liebling – producing, keyboards, programming
- Tue Madsen – audio engineering, mixing
- Peter Neuber – mastering
- Mircea Gabriel Eftemie – artwork, design
- Rene Ubachs – additional engineering
