= Issue number =

An issue number to the account number (also known as PAN Sequence Number) is featured on certain debit cards, primarily United Kingdom ones such as Switch and Maestro as well as German girocards.

Because the bulk of the account number is determined by the sort code and the bank account number, the card number cannot be changed if the card is lost or stolen (without changing the underlying bank account number), and instead the issue number is changed.

== See also ==
- Issue date (disambiguation)
