= 66Sick =

Studio album by Disbelief
- Released: 17 May 2005
- Genres: Death metal, sludge metal, nu metal
- Length: 49:28
- Label: Nuclear Blast
- Producer: Tue Madsen

Disbelief chronology
Spreading the Rage (2003)	66Sick (2005)	Navigator (2007)

Professional ratings
Review scores
Source	Rating
AllMusic	3.5/5 stars

66Sick is the sixth full-length album by death metal band Disbelief. It is the second to be released on Nuclear Blast and to gain worldwide distribution. Two of the songs, "Sick" and "Rewind It All", were made into singles with accompanying videos which are available for download on the band's official website here.

This album is also their first to make use of drop-tunings (although in this case they are tuned to A♯, not D).

== Track listing ==
No.	Title	Length
1.	"66" (Intro)	1:44
2.	"Sick"	4:35
3.	"Floating on High"	3:22
4.	"For God?"	5:14
5.	"Continue (From This Point)"	4:00
6.	"Crawl"	4:02
7.	"Rewind It All (Death or Glory)"	4:15
8.	"Lost in Time"	6:06
9.	"Try"	3:47
10.	"Edges"	5:45
11.	"Mental Signpost"	2:23
12.	"To Atone for All"	4:12

=== Bonus tracks ===
The first-edition release came with a slipcover and four bonus tracks, all of which are covers.

No.	Title	Original Artist	Length
13.	"Coast to Coast"	Scorpions	5:03
14.	"Dogs on Leads"	Accept	4:37
15.	"Spill the Blood"	Slayer	4:39
16.	"Stranger in a Strange Land"	Iron Maiden	6:03
