= Cult of the Dead =

Album by Legion of the Damned

Studio album by Legion of the Damned
- Released: 19 December 2008
- Recorded: Stage One Studios in Germany, 11 September – 3 October
- Genre: Thrash metal, death metal
- Length: 41:38
- Label: Massacre
- Producer: Andy Classen

Legion of the Damned chronology
Feel the Blade (2008)	Cult of the Dead (2008)	Descent Into Chaos (2011)

Alternative cover
- Variant digipak packing

Cult of the Dead is a 2008 album by thrash metal/death metal band Legion of the Damned. In common with previous albums, the lyrics heavily reference the dark side of the occult. The special edition comes with an item unique in metal merchandising (And possibly all genres of music), being a cheese block, emblazoned with their logo. This is a nod to the band's Dutch origins. The digipak version of the album features an alternative cover and comes with a DVD. The DVD has the same track listing as the CD, but then being played in their rehearsal place.

== Track listing ==
1. "Sermon of Sacrilege (Intro)" – 1:14
2. "Pray & Suffer" – 4:14
3. "Black Templar" – 3:20
4. "House of Possession" – 3:49
5. "Black Wings of Yog-Sothoth" – 2:54
6. "Cult of the Dead" – 4:17
7. "Necrosophic Blessing" – 3:45
8. "Enslaver of Souls" – 4:06
9. "Solar Overlord" – 3:30
10. "Lucifer Saviour" – 3:41
11. "The Final Godsend" – 6:46

== Personnel ==
- Maurice Swinkels – vocals
- Richard Ebisch – guitar
- Harold Gielen – bass
- Erik Fleuren – drums
