= Executor (disambiguation) =

An executor is someone who carries something out, such as the administration of an estate.

"Executor" may also refer to:

- Literary executor, person acting on behalf of beneficiaries under a deceased author's will
- Executor (software), for running 68k Macintosh applications on IBM-compatible PCs
- Executor (Star Wars), a fictional starship in the Star Wars universe
- Executor (rocket engine) a liquid fuel rocket engine

== See also ==
- Executer, a Brazilian thrash metal band
- Executioner (disambiguation)
