= Legion of the Damned (band) =

Dutch thrash/death metal band

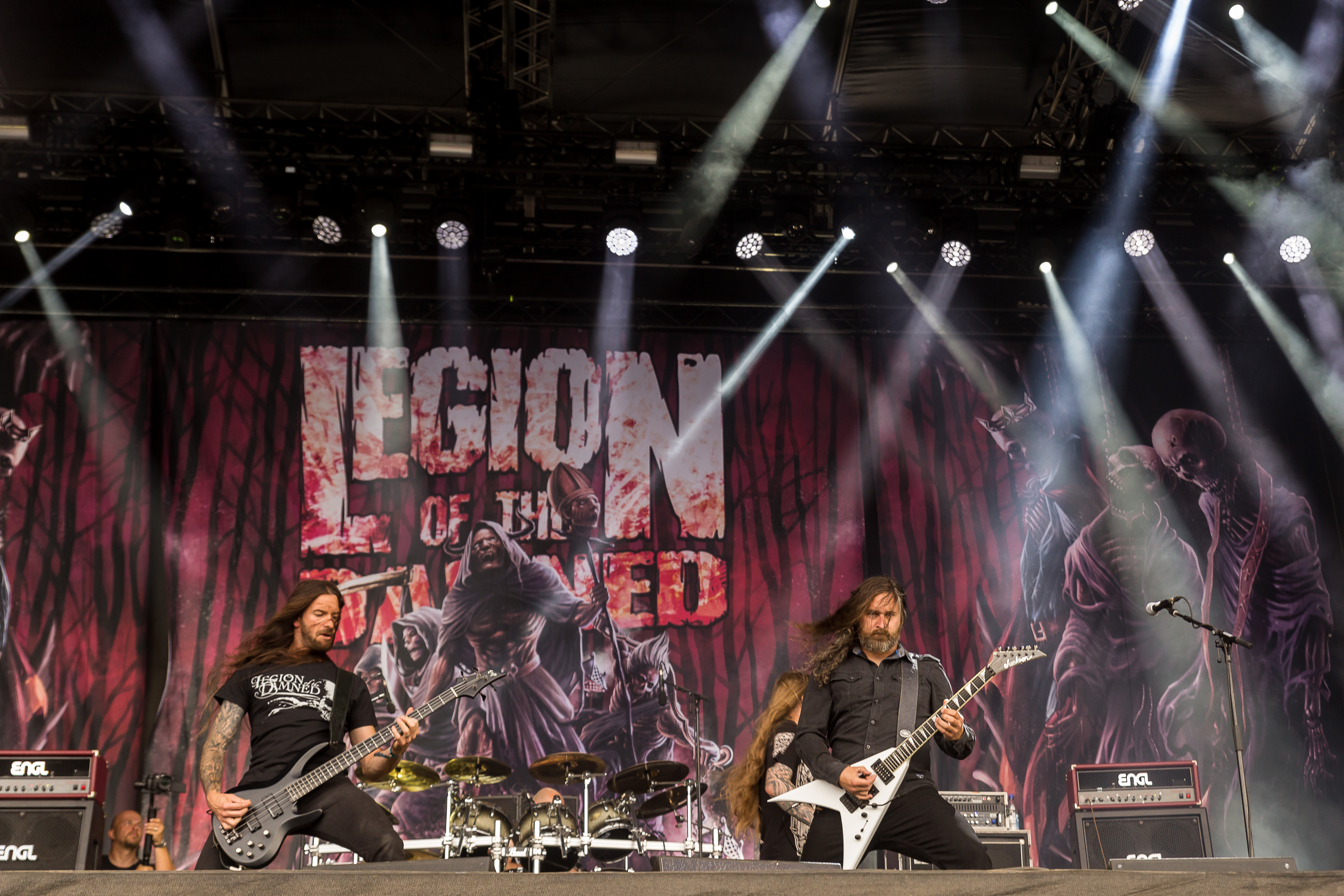
- Legion of the Damned at Rockharz Open Air 2019, Germany

Background information
- Also known as: Occult (1992-2006)
- Origin: Netherlands
- Genres: Thrash metal, death metal, death-thrash
- Years active: 1992–present
- Labels: Massacre, Napalm
- Members: Maurice Swinkels; Ruud Strijbosch; Harold Gielen; Erik Fleuren; Fabian Verweij
- Past members: Richard Ebisch; Twan Fleuren; Leon Pennings; Sjors Tuithof; Rachel Heyzer; Twan van Geel
- Website: legionofthedamned.net

Legion of the Damned is a Dutch thrash metal/death metal band, formed in 1992 as Occult and renamed Legion of the Damned in 2006. The band focuses on horror, occult, and religious themes and apocalyptic events. They recorded the albums Malevolent Rapture and Sons of the Jackal at Stage One Studio with producer Andy Classen. The special edition of their 2008 release, Cult of the Dead, included a cheese block emblazoned with their logo.

Former band member Twan Fleuren committed suicide on 21 May 2011.

== Members ==
Current members

- Maurice Swinkels – vocals (1992–present)
- Erik Fleuren – drums (1992–present)
- Harold Gielen – bass (2006–present)
- Fabian Verweij – guitars (2020–present)
- Ruud Strijbosch - guitars (2024-present)

Former members

- Leon Pennings – guitars (1992–1999)
- Sjors Tuithof – bass (1992–1999)
- Richard Ebisch – guitars (1994–2011)
- Rachel Heyzer – vocals (1994–2001)
- Twan Fleuren – bass (1999–2006; died 2011)
- Twan van Geel – guitars (2011–2023)

Live members

- Fabian Verweij – guitars (2018–2020)
- Hein Willekens – guitars (2012–2017)
Legion of the Damned live at Rock unter den Eichen 2024

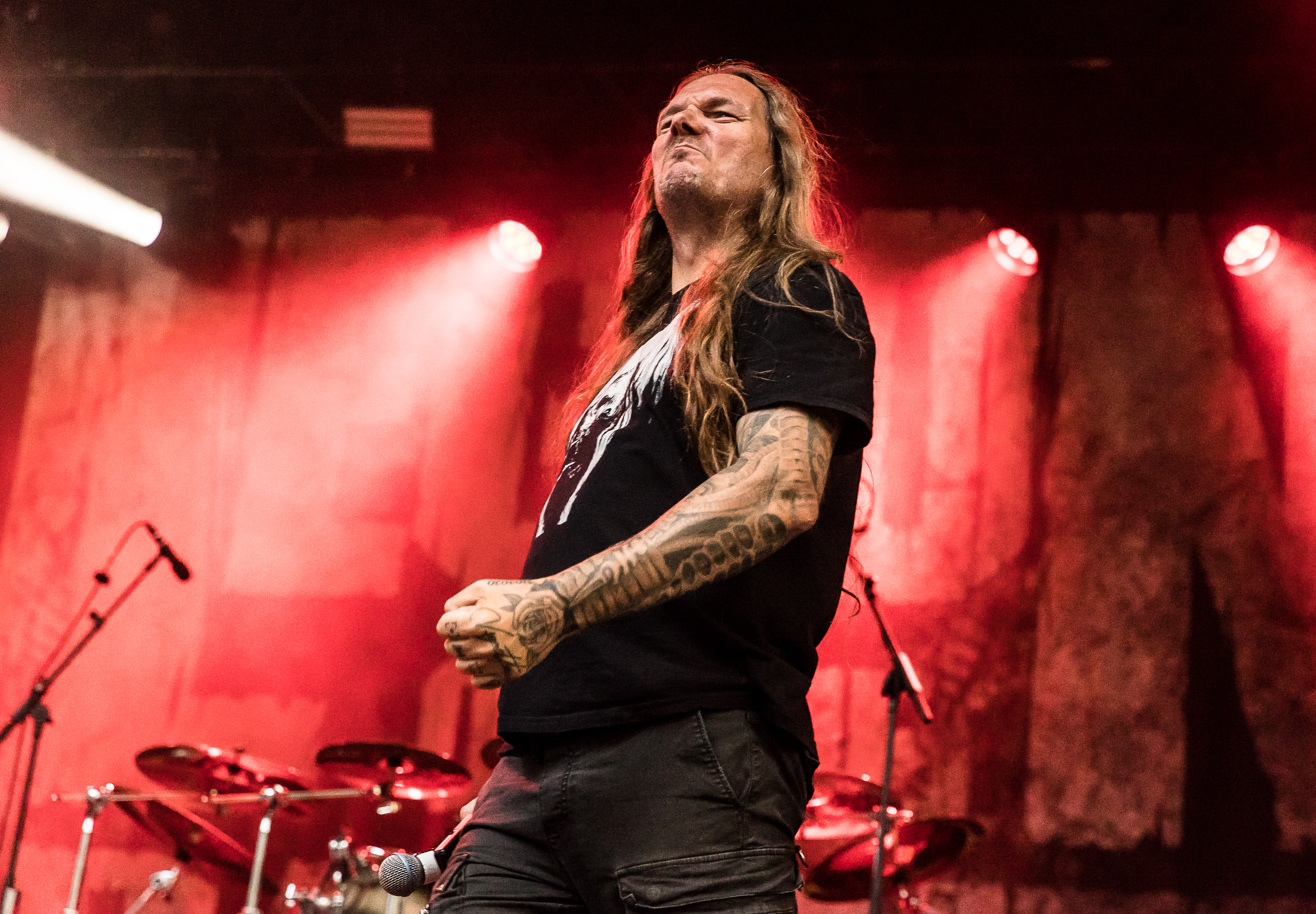
Maurice Swinkels

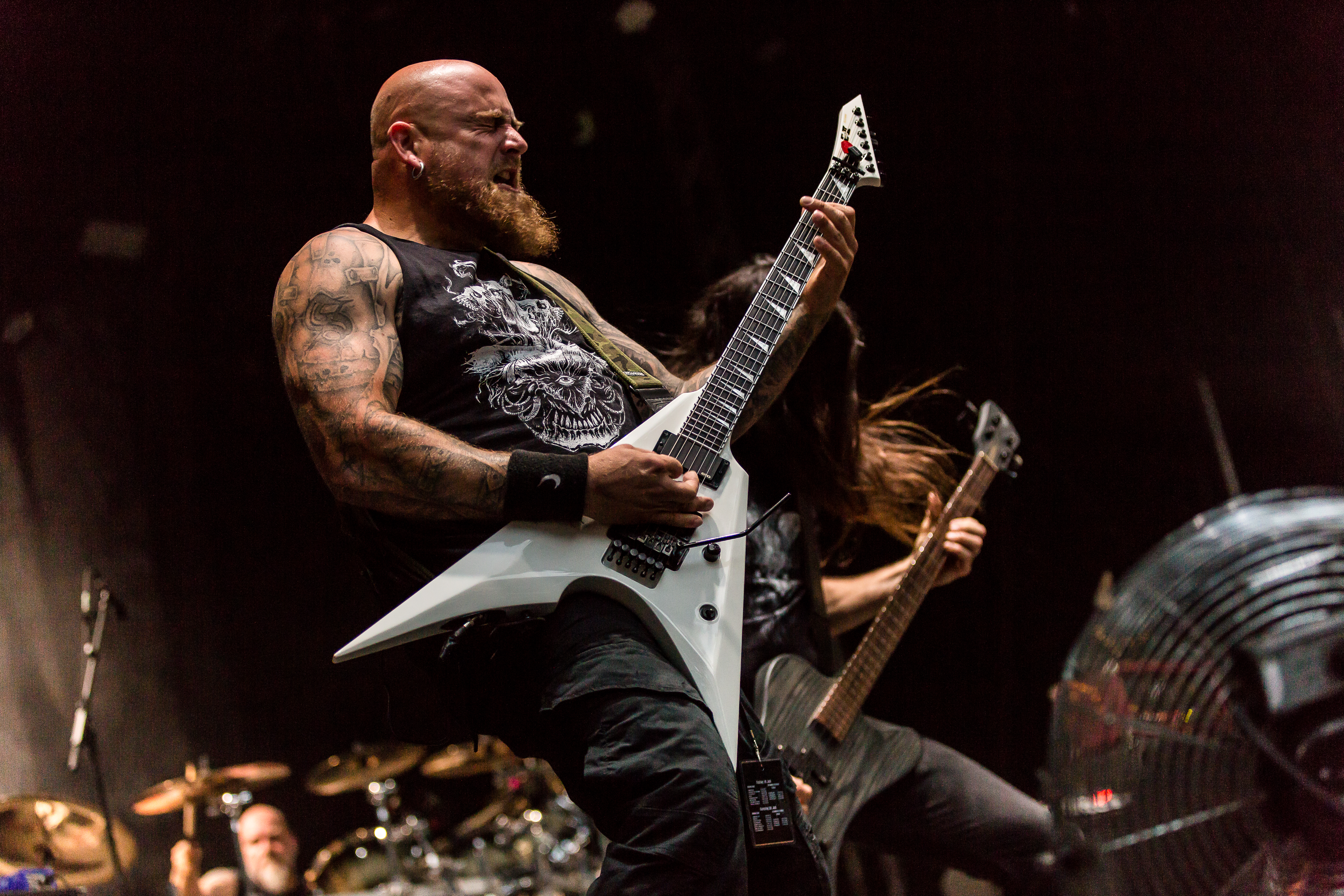
Ruud Strijbosch

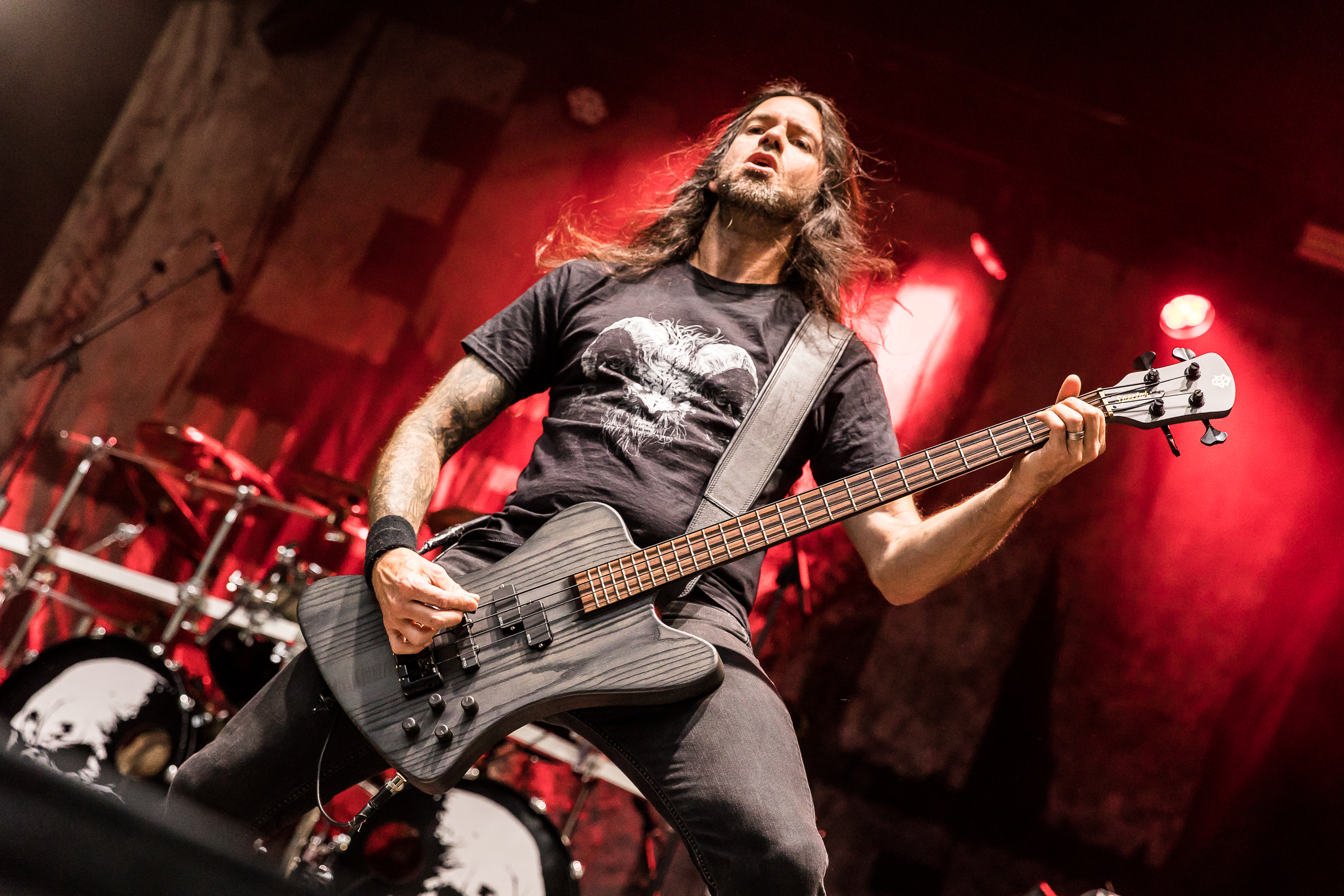
Harold Gielen

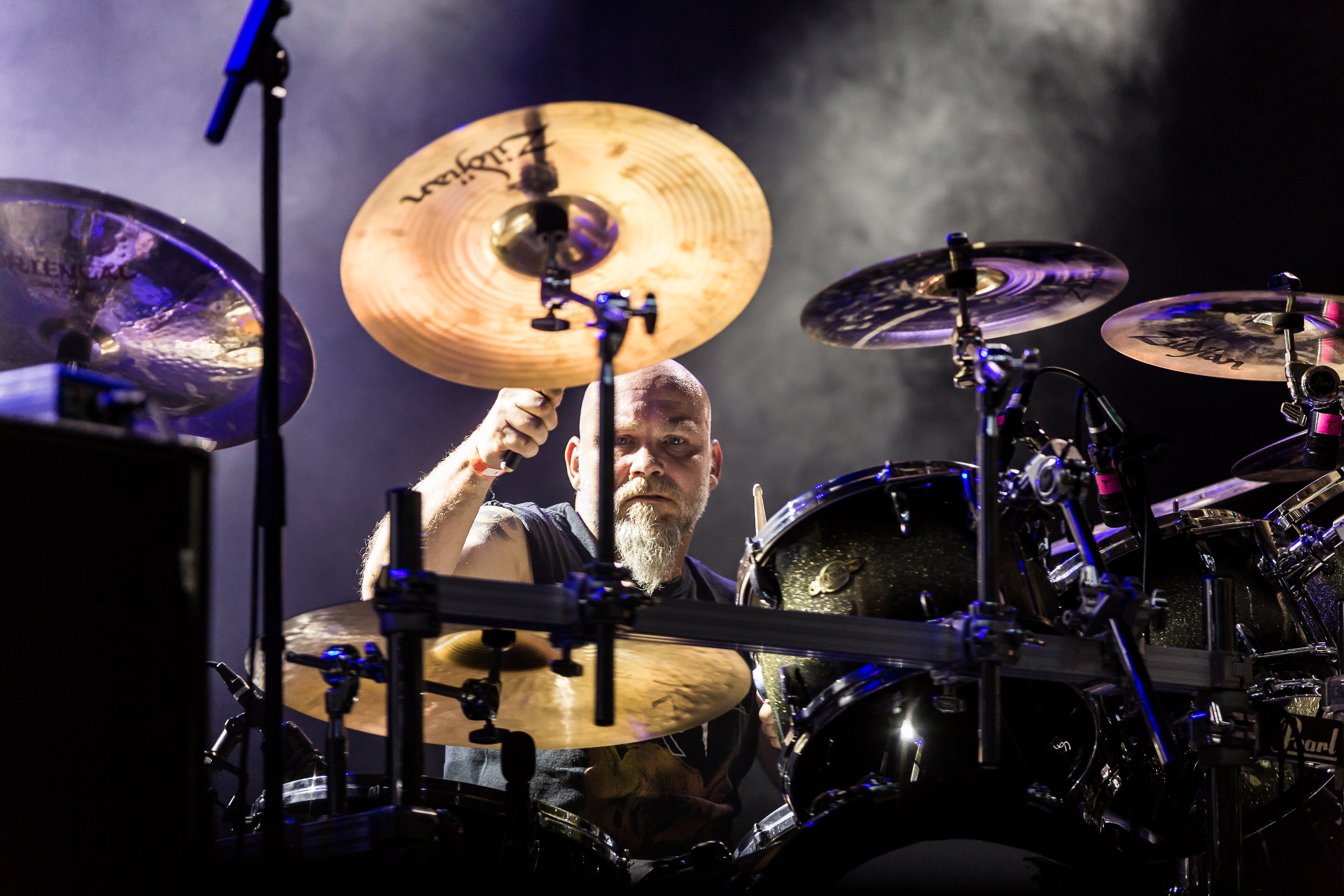
Erik Fleuren

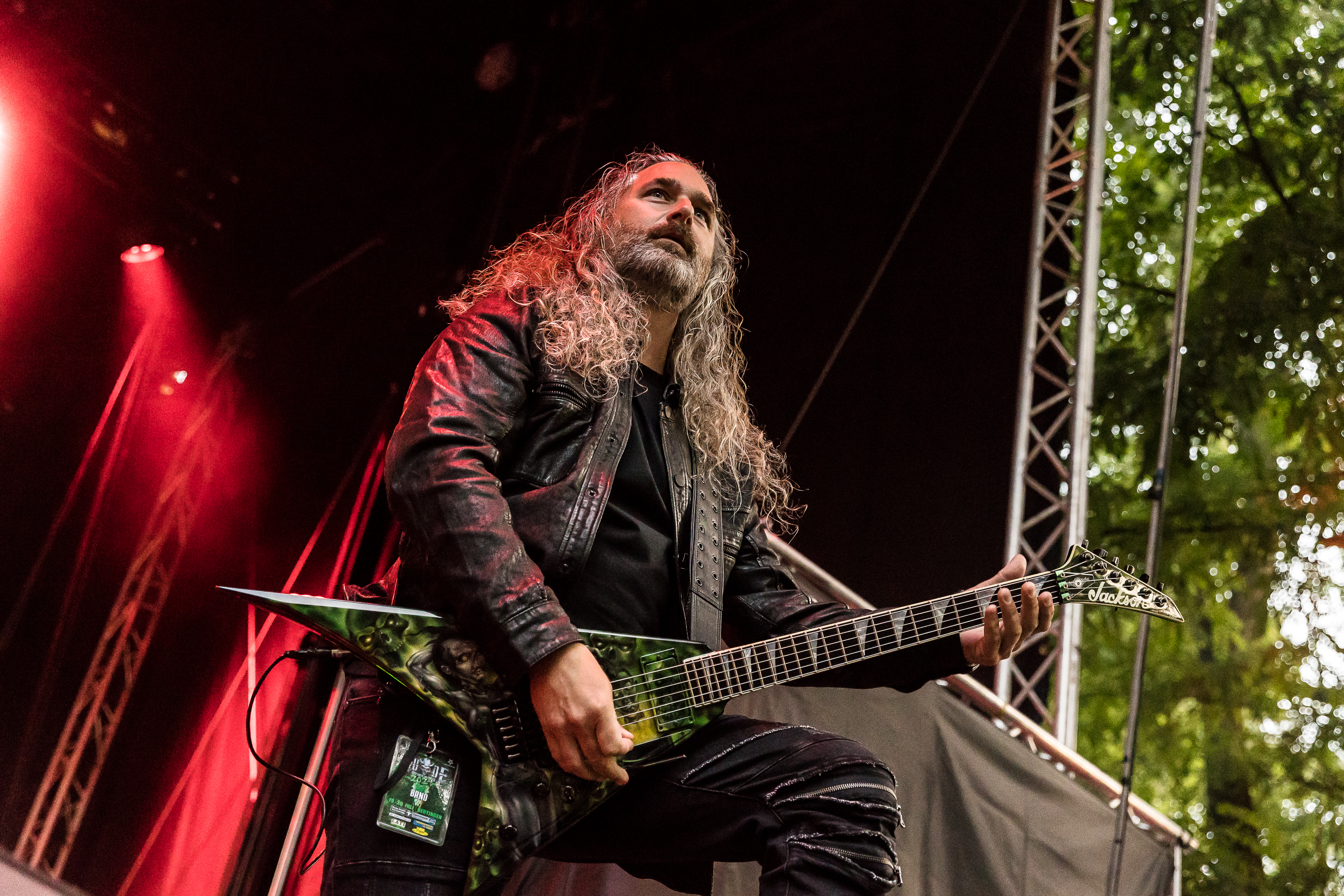
Fabian Verweij

Timeline

== Discography ==
Discography as Legion of the Damned (2006-present)

- Malevolent Rapture (2006)
- Sons of the Jackal (2007)
- Feel the Blade (2008)
- Cult of the Dead (2008)
- Descent Into Chaos (2011)
- Ravenous Plague (2014)
- Slaves of the Shadow Realm (2019)
- The Poison Chalice (2023)

Discography as Occult (1992–2006)

- Prepare to Meet Thy Doom (1994)
- The Enemy Within (1996)
- Of Flesh and Blood (1999)
- Rage to Revenge (2001)
- Elegy for the Weak (2003)
