= Caledonia (Suidakra album) =

Studio album by Suidakra
- Released: November 17, 2006
- Recorded: Gernhart Records Studio, July 10, 2006 - July 30, 2006
- Genre: Melodic death metal
- Length: 49:57
- Label: Armageddon

Suidakra chronology
Command to Charge (2005)	Caledonia (2006)	Crógacht (2009)

Professional ratings
Review scores
Source	Rating
About.com	3.5/5 stars
AllMusic	2/5 stars

Caledonia is the eighth studio album by the German melodic death metal band SuidAkrA. The lyrical themes of Caledonia are the mystical side of the tribe of the Picts, their war against the attacking Roman Empire and the co-incidence of these two completely different worlds.

Caledonia was recorded and mixed between July 10, 2006 and July 30, 2006 by Martin Buchwalter at Gernhart Recording Studio in Siegburg, Germany. The album was released on November 17, 2006 by Armageddon Music. It was released in the USA on May 22, 2007 through Locomotive Records.

== Track listing ==
All music by SuidAkrA. All lyrics written by Marcel Schoenen.

1. "Highland Hills" – 8:01
2. "A Blackened Shield" – 5:15
3. "The Ember Deid (Part II)" – 3:15
4. "Evoke the Demon" – 5:27
5. "Forth-Clyde" – 5:31
6. "Ramble" – 2:57
7. "Dawning Tempest" – 5:13
8. "The Distant Call" – 3:34
9. "On Torrid Sand" – 3:52
10. "The IXth Legion" – 5:44
11. "Farewell" – 1:14

== Personnel ==
- Arkadius Antonik – guitars, vocals
- Marcel Schoenen – guitars, vocals, lyrics
- Marcus Riewaldt – bass
- Lars Wehner – drums
- Axel Römer - bagpipes
- Martin Buchwalter – mixing
- Michael Schwabe – mastering
