= Executioner (album) =

Studio album by Mantic Ritual
- Released: March 10, 2009
- Genres: Thrash metal, heavy metal
- Length: 53:13
- Label: Nuclear Blast Records
- Producer: Andy Classen

Executioner is the debut studio album by American heavy metal band Mantic Ritual, released in 2009 on Nuclear Blast Records. This is their only release with drummer Adam Haritan, and would be the only studio album from the band until the 2022 follow up EP.

== Critical reception ==
Professional ratings
Review scores
Source	Rating
AllMusic	3.5/5 stars

Exclaim! gave a strongly positive review of the album, describing it as "upbeat blast of cutting aggression, riding the fine line between onslaught and overbearing". AllMusic noted the lack of originality in the band's songs. However, the performance quality and energy were both complimented as exemplars of thrash metal.

== Track listing ==
All songs written by Mantic Ritual.

No.	Title	Length
1.	"One by One"	3:37
2.	"Executioner"	4:34
3.	"Black Tar Sin"	7:00
4.	"Death and Destruction"	4:10
5.	"Murdered to Death"	5:40
6.	"Souls"	7:13
7.	"Panic"	4:28
8.	"Double the Blood"	5:48
9.	"Thrashatonement"	2:49
10.	"By the Cemetery"	3:11
11.	"Next Attack"	4:43
Total length:		53:13

== Personnel ==
- Dan Wetmore – vocals, guitar
- Jeff Potts – guitar
- Ben Mottsman – bass
- Adam Haritan – drums
