= Malevolent Rapture =

Studio album by Legion of the Damned
- Released: 6 January 2006
- Recorded: 4–17 October 2004 at Stage One Studio in Bühne, Germany
- Genre: Thrash metal, death metal
- Length: 39:14
- Label: Massacre
- Producer: Andy Classen

Legion of the Damned chronology
Malevolent Rapture (2006)	Sons of the Jackal (2007)

Malevolent Rapture is a 2006 album by thrash metal/death metal band Legion of the Damned. It was their first album since the demise their preceding band Occult with the loss of previous lead singer Rachel Heyzer. In common with later albums the lyrics heavily reference the dark side of the occult and apocalyptic themes. The album was created in Stage One Studio and produced by Andy Classen.

== Track listing ==
1. "Legion of the Damned" - 3:12
2. "Death's Head March" - 3:47
3. "Werewolf Corpse" - 3:57
4. "Into the Eye of the Storm" - 4:31
5. "Malevolent Rapture" - 4:06
6. "Demonfist" - 4:29
7. "Taste of the Whip" - 3:39
8. "Bleed for Me" - 3:58
9. "Scourging the Crowned King" - 3:40
10. "Killing for Recreation" - 3:51

== Personnel ==
- Maurice Swinkels – vocals
- Richard Ebisch – guitar
- Twan Fleuren – bass
- Erik Fleuren – drums
