= Command to Charge =

Studio album by Suidakra
- Released: April 25, 2005
- Recorded: Gernhart Records Studio, November 2, 2004 - November 25, 2004
- Genre: Melodic death metal
- Length: 43:20
- Label: Armageddon Music

Suidakra chronology
Signs for the Fallen (2003)	Command to Charge (2005)	Caledonia (2006)

Professional ratings
Review scores
Source	Rating
AllMusic	3/5 stars

Command to Charge is the seventh studio album by the German melodic death metal band Suidakra.

== Track listing ==
1. "Decibel Dance" - 4:15
2. "C14_Measured by Infinity" - 5:17
3. "Haughs of Cromdale" - 0:29
4. "The Alliance" - 4:15
5. "A Runic Rhyme" - 1:49
6. "Second Skin" - 4:50
7. "Reap the Storm" - 4:26
8. "Gathered in Fear" - 4:34
9. "Strange Perfection" - 5:26
10. "Dead Man's Reel (instrumental)" - 4:17
11. "The End Beyond Me" - 3:42

== Personnel ==
- Arkadius Antonik – lead, rhythm, melodic, acoustic guitars & main vocals
- Marcel Schoenen – melodic, acoustic guitars & clean vocals
- Marcus Riewaldt- bass
- Lars Wehner – drums & percussion
- Martin Buchwalter – engineering & mastering
- Mike Bohatch - covert art
- Nils Bross - Suidakra logo
