= Sons of the Jackal =

Sons Of The Jackal

Studio album by Legion of the Damned
- Released: January 5, 2007
- Recorded: October 6–20, 2006 at Stage One Studio in Germany
- Genre: Thrash metal, death metal
- Length: 37:27
- Label: Massacre
- Producer: Andy Classen

Legion of the Damned chronology
Malevolent Rapture (2006)	Sons Of The Jackal (2007)	Feel the Blade (2008)

Professional ratings
Review scores
Source	Rating
Metal Express Radio	9.5/10 stars
Chronicles of Chaos	6.5/10 stars

Sons of the Jackal is a 2007 album by thrash metal/death metal band Legion of the Damned. Lyrical themes on the album include horror motifs, the devastation of nuclear war and occult and religious ideas and actions. Unusually for a Western metal album some lyrics draw on Islamic eschatology and history in places ("Alamut awake, Hear its divine call, I am incarnate, The breath of Dajjal" from "Atomicide") and make equal attacks of both Mohammed and Jesus Christ ("I tear out the eyes of Jesus, As he hangs upon the cross, I blind the face of Mohammed, And throw his body to the boards" from "Ten Horns Arise"). The song Son of the Jackal is a reference to the Anti-Christ character of Damien in the Omen horror movies, who was born in such a manner. Sons of the Jackal peaked at #54 on the German albums chart.

== Track listing ==
1. "Son of the Jackal" - 3:52
2. "Undead Stillborn" - 3:59
3. "Avenging Archangel" - 3:28
4. "Death Is My Master (Slay for Kali)" - 5:09
5. "Sepulchral Ghoul" - 4:19
6. "Seven Heads They Slumber" - 1:59
7. "Infernal Wrath" - 4:07
8. "Atomicide" - 3:18
9. "Ten Horns Arise" - 3:31
10. "Diabolist" - 3:40

== Personnel ==
- Maurice Swinkels – vocals
- Richard Ebisch – guitar
- Harold Gielen – bass
- Erik Fleuren – drums
