= Issue date =

Issue date may refer to:

- Cover date, the date displayed on the covers of periodical publications
- Effective date, the date upon which something is considered to take effect
- Issue number, a supplementary number used on some debit cards

== See also ==
- Issue (disambiguation)
