= Invocation (Dew-Scented album) =

Studio album by Dew Scented
- Released: 2010
- Genre: Thrash metal, death metal
- Language: English
- Label: Metal Blade Records; Prosthetic Records

Dew Scented chronology
Incinerate	Invocation

Invocation is the eighth studio album by the German thrash metal/death metal band Dew-Scented, released in 2010 in Europe by Metal Blade Records and in the United States by Prosthetic Records

== Track listing ==
No.	Title	Length
1.	"Downfall" (Instrumental)	1:47
2.	"Arise from Decay"	4:38
3.	"The Invocation"	3:38
4.	"Have No Mercy on Us"	4:37
5.	"Artificial Life"	3:45
6.	"Condemnation"	3:05
7.	"Totem" (Instrumental)	1:06
8.	"Torn to Shreds"	3:48
9.	"Revel in Contempt"	4:01
10.	"A Critical Mass"	4:43
11.	"Global Hysteria"	4:29
12.	"Slaves of Consent"	6:19

== Reception ==
Professional ratings
Review scores
Source	Rating
About Entertainment	3/5 stars
Metal Express Radio	8.5/10 stars
Lords of Metal	8.5/10 stars
Metal Hammer	(6/7)

== Personnel ==
- Alexander Pahl - bass guitar
- Leif Jensen - vocals
- Michael Borchers - guitar
- Martin Walczak - guitar
- Marc-Andree Dieken - drums
