= Signs for the Fallen =

Studio album by Suidakra
- Released: July 28, 2003
- Recorded: Stage One Studio, April 9, 2003 - April 25, 2003
- Genre: Melodic death metal
- Length: 42:17
- Label: Century Media Records
- Producer: Andy Classen

Suidakra chronology
Emprise to Avalon (2002)	Signs for the Fallen (2003)	Command to Charge (2005)

Signs for the Fallen is the sixth studio album by the German melodic death metal band Suidakra.

== Track listing ==
1. "Revenant" – 5:05
2. "Crown the Lost" – 4:36
3. "Threnody" – 1:42
4. "Trails of Gore" – 4:35
5. "The Ember Died" – 0:21
6. "When Eternity Echoes" – 2:02
7. "Signs for the Fallen" – 5:37
8. "Dimorphic" – 4:20
9. "Bound in Changes" – 8:50
10. "A Vision's Demise" - 5:09

== Personnel ==
- Arkadius Antonik – lead, rhythm, melodic, acoustic guitars & main vocals
- Marcel Schoenen – melodic, acoustic guitars & clean vocals
- Marcus Riewaldt- bass
- Lars Wehner – drums & percussion
- Andy Classen – engineering & mastering
- Mike Bohatch - covert art
- Nils Bross - Suidakra logo
