= My Passion // Your Pain =

Studio album by Callenish Circle
- Released: 5 May 2003
- Recorded: January–February 2003
- Genre: Melodic death metal
- Length: 49:55
- Label: Metal Blade
- Producer: Andy Classen, Callenish Circle

Callenish Circle chronology
| Flesh Power Dominion (2002) | My Passion // Your Pain (2003) | Pitch.Black.Effects (2005) |

Professional ratings
Review scores
| Source | Rating |
|---|---|
| AllMusic | link |

My Passion // Your Pain is the fourth studio album by the Dutch melodic death metal band Callenish Circle.

== Track listing ==
1. "Soul Messiah" − 3:54
2. "Dwelling in Disdain" − 4:10
3. "Forsaken" − 4:55
4. "What Could Have Been..." − 7:13
5. "This Truculent Path" − 5:06
6. "My Hate Unfolds" − 7:07
7. "Misled" − 5:11
8. "My Passion //" − 2:25
9. "Conflicts" − 0:56
10. "// Your Pain" − 4:22
11. "Out of the Body" (Pestilence cover) − 4:37

== Personnel ==
- Patrick Savelkoul − vocals
- Ronny Tyssen − guitar
- Remy Dieteren − guitar
- Gavin Harte − drums
- Rene Rokx − bass
- Gail Liebling − background vocals
- Kaleen − female voices

Production

- Mixed by Andy Classen, Patrick Savelkoul, Ronny Tyssen and Gavin Harte
- Mastered by Peter Neuber
- Cover artwork by Niklas Sundin
