= Dew-Scented =

German thrash metal band

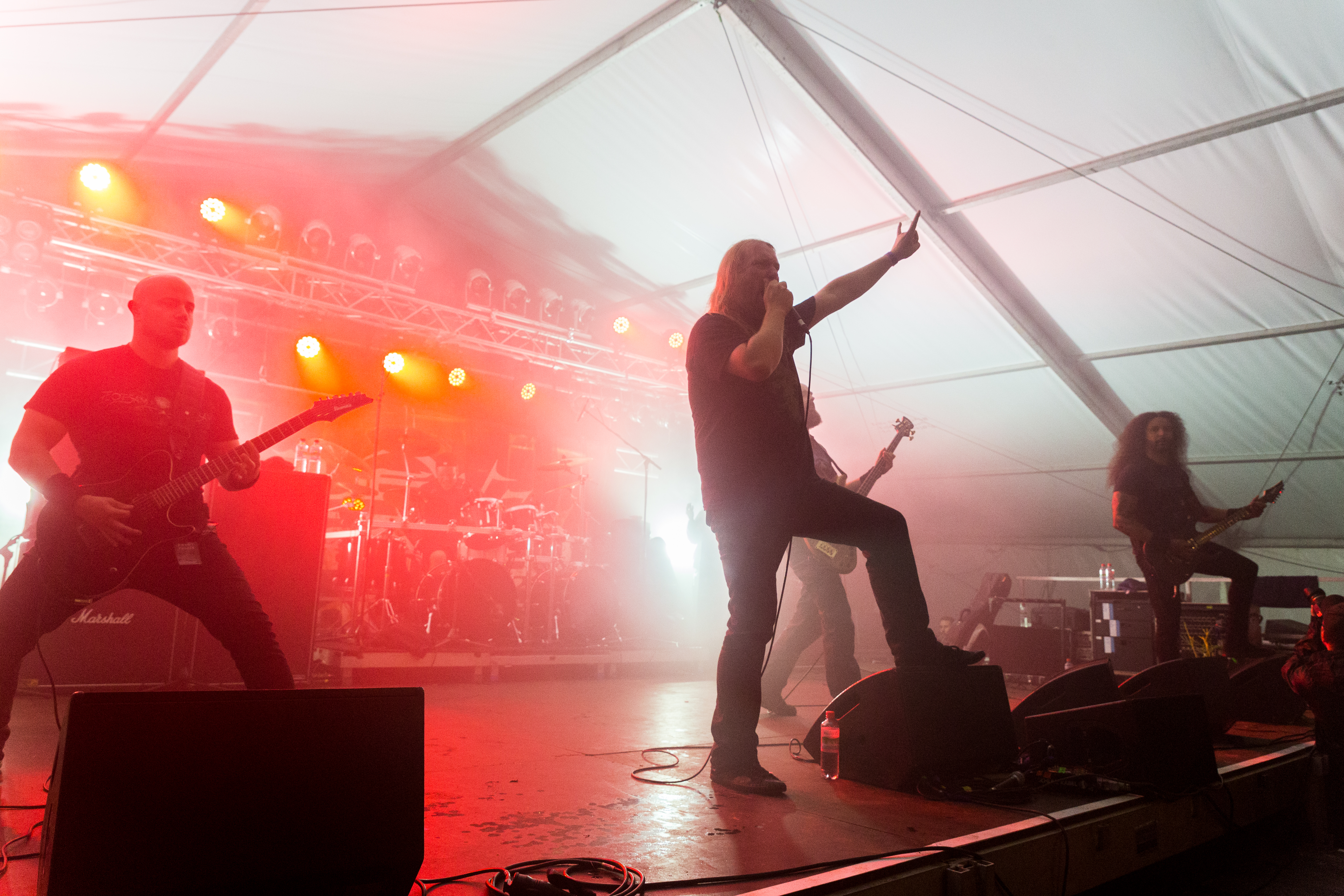
- Dew-Scented at Party.San Metal Open Air 2017

Background information
- Origin: Braunschweig, Germany
- Genres: Thrash metal, death metal
- Years active: 1992–2018
- Labels: Steamhammer, Nuclear Blast, Metal Blade, Prosthetic
- Members: Leif Jensen; Marvin Vriesde; Rory Hansen; Joost van der Graaf; Koen Herfst
- Past members: Ralf Klein; Jörg Szittnick; Patrick Heims; Tarek Stinshoff; Florian Müller; Hendrik Bache; Uwe Werning; Alexander Pahl; Martin Walczak; Michael Borchers; Marc-Andree Dieken
- Website: dew-scented.de

Dew-Scented was a German thrash and death metal band, active from 1992 to 2018. They released eight studio albums and were last signed to Metal Blade Records (Europe) and Prosthetic Records (USA/North America). Their name was inspired by Edgar Allan Poe.

== History ==
Vocalist Leif Jensen entered the band in 1992, drummer Uwe Werning in 1997, and guitarist Hendrik Bache in autumn 2001.

In winter 1992/1993, the north German band released their first demo, Symbolization, which was well known in the underground scene and helped them sign a record deal with SPV / Steamhammer.

In the spring of 1996, they released their debut album, Immortelle. They toured with Edge of Sanity, Lake Of Tears and Sadist. Due to increased band activity, there were line-up changes. In 1998, they joined the label Grind Syndicate Media / NBR and released their second album, Innoscent. In the same year, they played for the first time at Wacken Open Air.

In the summer of 1999, they released Ill-Natured, which was a mixture of death and thrash metal. Two years later, the album Inwards was released, on which they worked with Andy Classen. To promote the album, they played on various festivals with many German thrash metal bands such as Kreator, Sodom and Destruction. They toured the United States of America for the first time.

The release of the 2003 album Impact and the double album Ill-Natured & Innoscent, released under the German label Nuclear Blast, established the band as an accomplished thrash metal act, and many people compared them to Slayer.

Issue VI, the sixth album, was released in June 2005. The limited edition included the video for "Turn To Ash" and 17 live songs, recorded between 2002 and 2005. On 30 March 2007, the album Incinerate was released in Europe and on 3 April in North America.

Dew-Scented released their ninth album, Intermination, on 30 June 2015 via Prosthetic Records.

On 17 May 2018, the band announced they had broken up due to conflicting schedules with band members' personal lives.

== Members ==
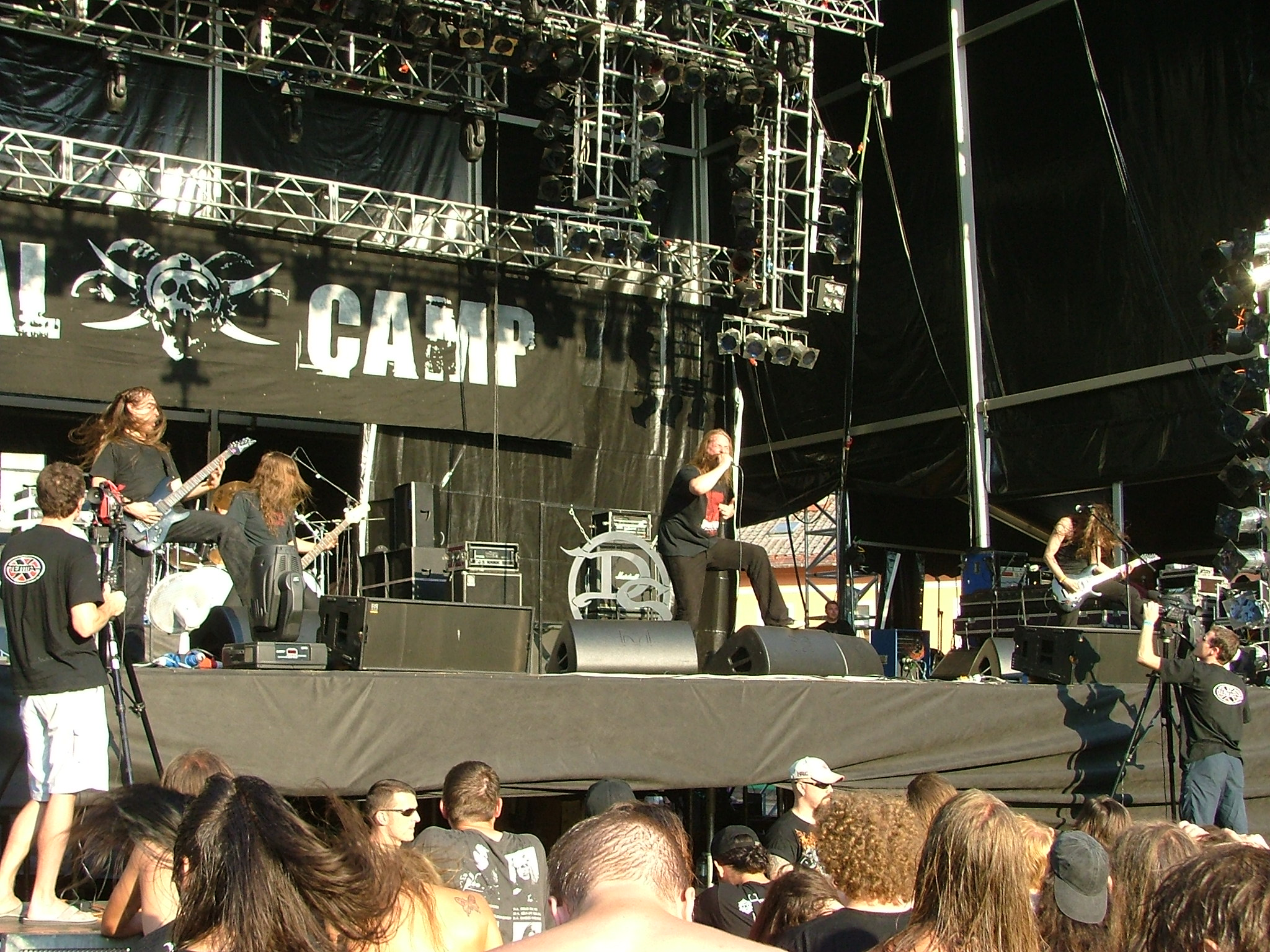
Dew-Scented at Metalcamp in 2007

=== Final lineup ===
- Leif Jensen – vocals (1992–2018)
- Marvin Vriesde – guitars (2005, 2012–2018)
- Rory Hansen – guitars (2012–2018)
- Joost van der Graaf – bass (2012–2018)
- Koen Herfst – drums (2012–2018)

=== Former members ===
- Jörg Szittnick – guitar (1992–1996)
- Tarek Stinshoff – drums (1992–1996)
- Ralf Klein – guitar (1996–1998)
- Patrick Heims – bass (1996–2003)
- Uwe Werning – drums (1997–2007)
- Florian Müller – guitar (1998–2008)
- Hendrik Bache – guitar (2001–2008)
- Alexander Pahl – bass (2003–2011)
- Michael Borchers – guitar (2008–2012)
- Marc-Andree Dieken – drums (2008–2012)
- Martin Walczak – guitar (2008–2010)

== Discography ==
=== Studio albums ===
- Immortelle (1996)
- Innoscent (1998)
- Ill-Natured (1999)
- Inwards (2002)
- Impact (2003)
- Issue VI (2005)
- Incinerate (2007)
- Invocation (2010)
- Icarus (2012)
- Intermination (2015)

=== Other releases ===
- Symbolization (1994, demo)
- Insurgent (2013, compilation)
