= Emprise to Avalon =

Studio album by Suidakra
- Released: July 26, 2002
- Recorded: Stage One Studio, December 4, 2001 - December 16, 2001 and February 11, 2002 - February 17, 2002
- Genre: Melodic death metal Folk metal
- Length: 40:07
- Label: Century Media Records
- Producer: Andy Classen and Schösch Classen

Suidakra chronology
The Arcanum (2000)	Emprise to Avalon (2002)	Signs for the Fallen (2003)

Emprise to Avalon is the fifth studio album by the German melodic death metal band Suidakra.

Metal.de described it as a "decent album that you can listen to again and again," stating it lacks in "truly fresh ideas, which are so important for consistently captivating songs."

== Track listing ==
1. "Darkane Times" – 5:47
2. "Dinas Emrys" – 1:54
3. "Pendragon's Fall" – 5:32
4. "The Highking" – 4:00
5. "The Spoils of Annwn" – 1:48
6. "The Quest" – 5:19
7. "And the Giants Dance..." – 5:14
8. "Song of the Graves" – 5:13
9. "Still the Pipes Are Calling" – 5:17

== Personnel ==
- Arkadius Antonik – lead, rhythm, melodic, acoustic guitars, bass, keyboards & main vocals
- Marcel Schoenen – melodic, acoustic guitars, tin whistle & clean vocals
- Lars Wehner – drums & percussion
- Germano Sanna - guitars (Live)
- Marcus Riewaldt- bass (Live)
- Andy and Schösch Classen – engineering
- Ulf Horbelt - mastering
- Kris Verwimp - covert art
- Nils Bross - Suidakra logo
- Torsten Reitemeier - band photos
- Tim Siebrecht - guest backing vocals on The High King and Darkane Times
