= Issue (company) =

Issue, Inc.
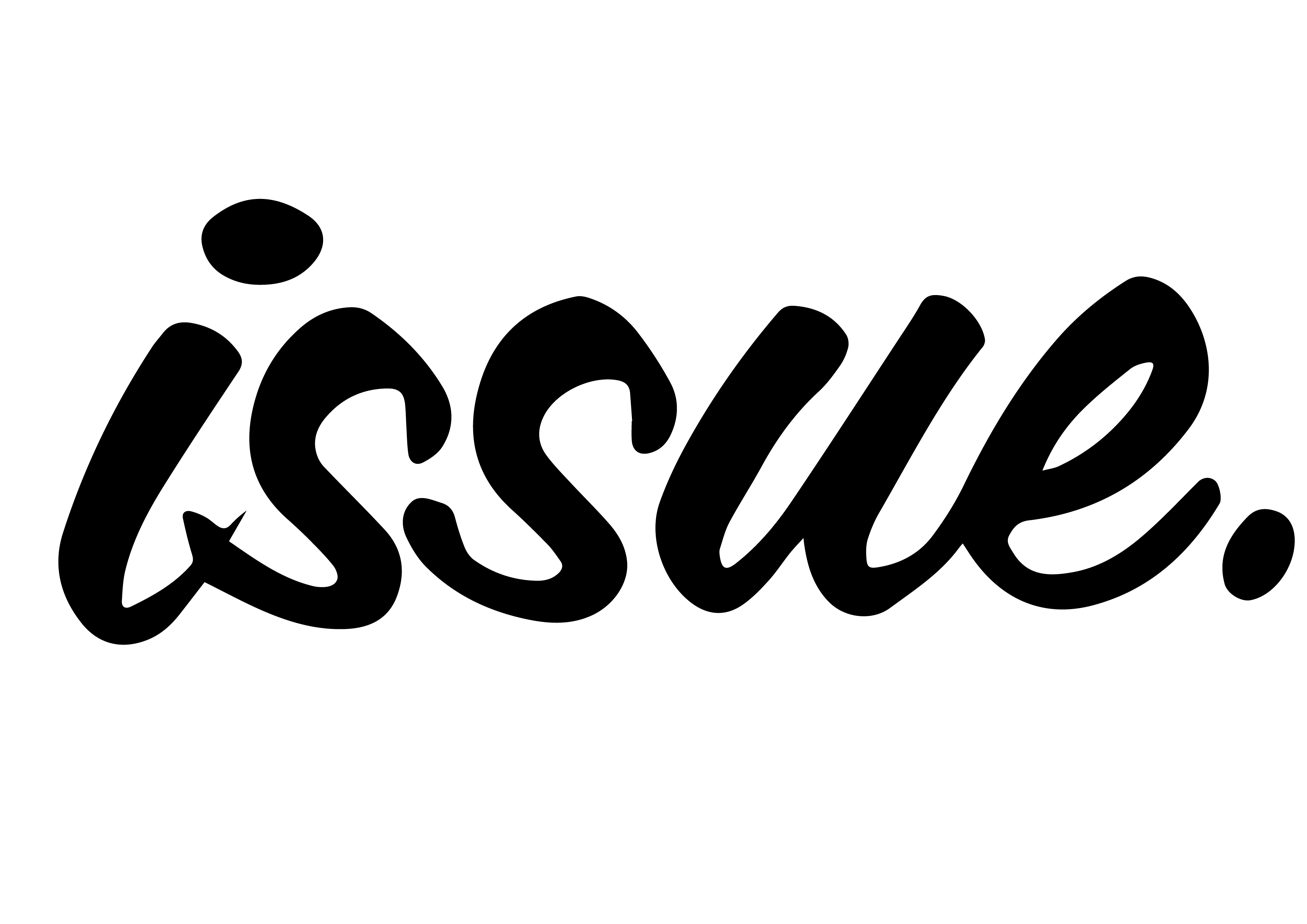
- Type: Private
- Industry: Digital Publishing
- Founded: (2012)
- Founder: Taylor Luk
- Number of locations: San Francisco; Sydney Australia
- Website: Official website

Issue is a digital publishing company that allows users to create digital magazines. They were founded in 2012 by Taylor Luk.

== History ==
The company was founded in 2012 by Taylor Luk, through the AngelPad that offers seed funding and three months of mentorship. The founder had previously started an online lyrics site, LyricsTime.

The initial idea originated from Shop2, a social shopping site developed by Taylor Luk, Mark Guo and Khoa Nguyen. The company was later reincorporated as Issue, Inc. in June 2013.

Issue received investments from AngelPad, Syd.Ventures and funding from Mondelēz International in their "Mobile Futures Australia", In the program, Mondelez partnered with Mobile Marketing startups to help build the future of in-store and mobile engagement.

== Issue platform ==
Issue allows users to create their own digital magazines via a web interface.

Issue Magazine Format: A Mobile publishing format that contains HTML5 pages with a proprietary CSS framework, Metadata, Assets (images, audios and videos) and Scripts that enable interactivity.

Issue Publisher: A web-based publishing platform that includes content management and aggregation features that can synchronize content from RSS feed, social media and product feeds from e-commerce platforms.

== Press and awards ==
- Winner of Mobile Futures Australia
- 10 Startups to watch in Cebit Australia
