= Transnight =

German heavymetal band

Transnight was a German heavy/power/thrash metal band. The band released two albums.

The band was founded in Marl in 1999. Following three demos, The Dark Half was issued in 2011 on Pure Underground Records, a sublabel of Pure Steel Records. The reception was mediocre, with Metal.de giving a 6 out of 10 rating. The main criticisms were the modesty of the guitars and the lack of "catchy choruses", rendering songs mediocre without sticking in the head. Other than that, "Transnight get (almost) everything right". Heavymetal.dk echoed the same moderate score. While the music was "pretty fierce", the production was woolly and the mix unbalanced. Craig Hartranft of Dangerdog only gave 2.5 of 5 points, stating that the listener would need a skip button here. Some riffs were good, but the mix of heavy, power and thrash meant that the band lacked direction, and the variation in tempo was repetitive, "inconclusive and often tiring results". Rock Hard thought much worse of the album, with their 2.5 points being given out of a possible 10. The reviewer criticized "the deathly boring riff-driven drivel" as well as the vocals of David Ivanov, whom he knew from the band Crossbow.

The Big Rip followed in 2013, but was self-released. Metal.de gave this a better score than the previous, 7 out of 10. The album was "a solid, thrash-riff-laden blast right from the start", with the vocals having improved as well.
