= Flesh Power Dominion =

Studio album by Callenish Circle
- Released: 12 February 2002
- Recorded: April–May 2001, Stage One Studio
- Genre: Melodic death metal
- Length: 47:23
- Label: Metal Blade
- Producer: Georg Classen, Andy Classen and Callenish Circle

Callenish Circle chronology
Graceful... Yet Forbidding (1999)	Flesh Power Dominion (2002)	My Passion // Your Pain (2003)

Professional ratings
Review scores
Source	Rating
AllMusic	3/5 stars

Flesh Power Dominion (typeset as FLESH_POWER_DOMINION) is the third studio album by Callenish Circle and the band's first album to be released through Metal Blade Records. It was released in 2002 along with a digipak edition that contained two bonus tracks. The name is a movie quote by "Pinhead" from the movie Hellraiser III.

== Track listing ==
All tracks are written by Callenish Circle, except where noted.

No.	Title	Writer(s)	Length
1.	"Obey Me..."		5:15
2.	"For What's It Good for..."		3:49
3.	"Witness Your Own Oblivion"		4:36
4.	"Take Me Along"		6:02
5.	"Bleeding"		5:56
6.	"Your Final Swansong"		5:32
7.	"Suffer My Disbelief"		5:09
8.	"They Have Chosen"		4:34
9.	"..."		1:40
10.	"Pull the Plug" (Death cover)	Chuck Schuldiner	4:50
11.	"When the Lady Smiles" (Golden Earring cover)	Barry Hay, George Kooymans	4:53

== Credits ==
Callenish Circle

- Patrick Savelkoul − vocals
- Remy Dieteren − guitar
- Ronny Tyssen − guitar
- Roland Schuschke − bass
- Gavin Harte − drums

Additional personnel

- Rick Bouwman – digital sound effects
- Andy Classen – mixing, producer
- Georg Classen – producer
- Niklas Sundin – artwork, design
- Sander Van Der Heide – mastering
