= The Arcanum (album) =

Studio album by Suidakra
- Released: September 4, 2000
- Recorded: February 28, 2000 – March 12, 2000
- Studio: Stage One Studio
- Genre: Melodic death metal, folk metal
- Length: 40:21
- Label: Last Episode Productions
- Producer: Andy Classen

Suidakra chronology
Lays from Afar (1999)	The Arcanum (2000)	Emprise to Avalon (2002)

The Arcanum is the fourth studio album by German melodic death metal band Suidakra.

Metal.de rated the album ten out of ten.

== Track listing ==
The Arcanum track listing
No.	Title	Length
1.	"Wartunes"	4:51
2.	"To Rest in Silence"	5:34
3.	"Dragonbreed"	3:59
4.	"Rise of Taliesin"	4:50
5.	"Last Fortress"	4:06
6.	"Gates of Nevermore"	4:16
7.	"Serenade to a Dream"	2:39
8.	"The Arcane Spell"	4:51
9.	"The One Piece Puzzle" (Skyclad cover)	5:15
Total length:		45:21

== Personnel ==
- Arkadius Antonik – lead, rhythm, melodic, acoustic guitars, main vocals
- Marcel Schoenen – melodic, acoustic guitars, clean vocals
- Nils Bross- bass, Suidakra logo
- Stefan Möller – drums
- Daniela Voigt – Keyboards, vocals
- Andy Classen – engineering & mastering
- Kris Verwimp – cover art
