= Callenish Circle =

Dutch melodic death metal band

Background information
- Origin: Holtum-Born, Limburg, Netherlands
- Genres: Melodic death metal
- Years active: 1992–2007
- Label: Metal Blade
- Members: Patrick Savelkoul; Remy Dieteren; Gavin Harte; Wim Vossen; Ronny Tijssen
- Past members: Jos Evers; Maurice Wagemans; John Gorissen; Roland Schuschke; René Rokx

Callenish Circle was a Dutch melodic death metal band formed in 1992. They recorded three of their albums for Metal Blade Records and broke up in February 2007. In 2002, they toured with God Dethroned, played at the Dutch version of Ozzfest and the German Party San Open Air, and opened for Dimmu Borgir. Their fourth album was released by Metal Blade in 2003; to support it, they played that year's Wacken Open Air and Summer Breeze festivals in Germany, and in October they were part of the Bonded by Metal Over Europe tour, headlined by Exodus, Nuclear Assault, and Agent Steel. In 2006, they toured Mexico (cited by the band as the high point of their career), before they broke up in 2007. A part of their song "Suffer My Disbelief" is used as an outro in the online review show Angry Joe Show.

== Members ==
=== Final lineup ===
- Wim Vossen − bass
- Remy Dieteren − guitar
- Gavin Harte − drums
- Ronny Tijssen − guitar
- Patrick Savelkoul − vocals

=== Past members ===
- Jos Evers − guitar (1992–1998)
- Maurice Wagemans − bass (1992–1995)
- John Gorissen − bass (1995–1997)
- Roland Schuschke − bass (1997–2002)
- René Rokx − bass (2002–2005)

== Discography ==
- Lovelorn (demo, 1995)
- Drift of Empathy (album, Hammerheart, 1996)
- Escape (EP, Polar Bear, 1998)
- Graceful... Yet Forbidding (album, DSFA (Benelux)/Edgerunner, 1999/2001)
- Flesh Power Dominion (album, Metal Blade, 2002)
- My Passion // Your Pain (album, Metal Blade, 2003)
- Forbidden Empathy (2CD, Karmageddon Media, 2005)
- Pitch.Black.Effects (album, Metal Blade, 2005/2006)
