= Cryptic Wintermoon =

German metal band

Cryptic Wintermoon is a German melodic black metal band that released two albums on Massacre Records.

The band was formed in 1993 out of the defunct group Black Prophecies, releasing their first demo in 1995 followed by the EP Cryptic Wintermoon in 1997 and a split album with Lord Astaroth. In 2003, the band played the Wacken Open Air Festival.

According to Powermetal.de, the band was on the path to filling a similar metal niche to Dimmu Borgir, but lost steam after their 1999 album The Age of Cataclysm. Though the album was "a real bullseye in keyboard-driven black metal", the band was not promoted "sufficiently" by their label at the time. The band changed label to Massacre Records, having to wait four years until 2003 to release A Coming Storm. Powermetal.de's reviewer saw the album as a success, except for two songs that were "blemishes". Cryptic Wintermoon's second (and last) Massacre Records album came in 2005 and was titled Of Shadows... and the Dark Things You Fear. It contained "memorable melodies, sophisticated arrangements, and catchy songs", delivered with "pinpoint precision". The album "should appeal to most listeners" and could propel Cryptic Wintermoon "to the top of the German extreme metal scene", with its combination of elements from several extreme metal subgenres, though "The band's goal is certainly not to reinvent the wheel".

Norway's Scream Magazine gave a 5 out of 6 score to both A Coming Storm and Of Shadows, stating that Cryptic Wintermoon showcased quality in every way. Though the genre was "worn", Cryptic Wintermoon showed that "it was still fully possible to do something original within melodic metal". Rock Hard also gave good scores, ranging from 9/10 for their first full-length, then 8.5 for the next two albums and 8 for their last, 2009's self-released Fear. Fear received an 8 out of 10 from Powermetal.de.

Noise.fi similarly gave a good 4 out of 5 score for Of Shadows.... Nonetheless, "some of the songs could have been thrown in the scrap heap already at the creation stage", since they "slip in one ear, out the other". The album was also said to be "pleasant to listen to in the background, but it does not seem to have a particularly long life". Vampster saw A Coming Storm as solid, but appearing at a descending curve of the black metal "boom". Vampster saw Of Shadows... as a "quite varied and solid" album that lacked "innovative riffs and originality", whereas Fear failed to impress. On the same note, Metal.de rated both Of Shadows... and Fear as 6 out of 10 efforts. Their analysis stated that the former album "doesn't venture beyond its familiar territory, relying exclusively on well-worn but proven structures. Many of the riffs and harmonic arcs are essentially generic melodic black metal fare, rarely venturing beyond the genre's standard repertoire. As a result, the songs are often highly predictable and barely distinguishable from those of other bands in the genre". Heavymetal.dk gave a 5 out of 10 for Of Shadows....

== Discography ==
- Voyage dans la lune (demo, 1995)
- Cryptic Wintermoon EP (1997)
- Franconian Frost (split, 1998, Perverted Taste)
- The Age of Cataclysm (1999, Ars Metalli)
- A Coming Storm (2003, Massacre Records)
- Of Shadows... and the Dark Things You Fear (2005, Massacre Records)
- Fear (2009)
