= Descent into Chaos (Legion of the Damned album) =

Descent Into Chaos

Studio album by Legion of the Damned
- Released: January 7, 2011
- Recorded: Abyss Studios
- Genres: Thrash Metal; Death Metal
- Length: 40:30
- Label: Massacre Records
- Producer: Peter Tägtgren

Legion of the Damned chronology
Cult of the Dead (2008)	Descent Into Chaos (2011)	Ravenous Plague (2014)

Professional ratings
Review scores
Source	Rating
Metal Temple	link
Metalholic	(7.7/10) link
Heavy Blog Is Heavy	link

Descent Into Chaos is the fifth studio album by the Dutch Metal band, Legion of the Damned, released on January 7, 2011, through Massacre Records.

== Track listing ==
No.	Title	Length
1.	"Descent Into Chaos (Intro)"	1:50
2.	"Night Of The Sabbath"	3:32
3.	"War Is In My Blood"	3:35
4.	"Shrapnel Rain"	4:02
5.	"Holy Blood, Holy War"	4:14
6.	"Killzone"	4:02
7.	"Lord Of The Flies"	5:22
8.	"Desolation Empire"	4:26
9.	"The Hand Of Darkness"	4:34
10.	"Repossessed"	4:53
11.	"Legion Of The Damned (feat. Peter Tägtgren)"
Total length:		40:30

== Personnel ==
- Maurice Swinkels - Vocals
- Richard Ebisch - Guitars
- Harold Gielen - Bass
- Erik Fleuren - Drums
