= Henrik Karlsson (musicologist) =

Swedish musicologist and author

- Born: Klas Gustaf Henrik Karlsson; 25 June 1940 (age 84); Jörn, Västerbotten, Sweden

Klas Gustaf Henrik Karlsson (born 25 June 1940) is a Swedish musicologist and author.

== Biography ==
He was editorial secretary of the Sohlman Dictionary of Music between 1972–1978 and defended his thesis in 1988 at the University of Gothenburg. On 11 May 1993, he was elected 887th member of the Royal Swedish Academy of Music and was its research officer since 1991. In 2013, he published a biography books about Wilhelm Peterson-Berger, one of the most famous Swedish national romantic composers.

== Publications ==
- Wilhelm Peterson-Berger: tondiktare och kritiker (2013)
