= Mindfield (band) =

German thrash metal band

Mindfield is a thrash metal band that began in Germany in the year 1994. The band started when guitarist Rainer Sickler joined with four other musicians. However the band line-up altered frequently for the following two years, it was then, in 1996 that the band released its first demo titled "Fields Of Vision". During that period, the band toured with other German bands such as Totenmond, Night In Gails, and Crosscut. In 1997 ExamMindfield released an EP titled "The Final Piece".

Mindfield was signed to the record label Gutter Records in 1999. Later, in 2000, released their first full-length album entitled "Deviant". The band later signed with Lifeforce Records, the same label that claimed Trivium's early works. In 2003 Mindfield released "Below" with Lifeforce Records. Mindfield broke up in 2005.

== Band members ==
Last line-up

- Rainer Sicker - rhythm and lead guitars
- Marc Zirnsak - rhythm and lead guitars
- Danny Carbus - keyboards, vocals
- Philip Akoto - bass, growls
- Sascha Schiller - drums

== Discography ==
=== Studio albums ===
- 2000: Deviant
- 2003: Be-low
- 2012: Teeth Marks

=== Singles & EPs ===
- 1996: Fields Of Vision
- 1997: The Final Piece

== Other Mindfield appearances ==
Full Album Title: Mindfield - A Third Mind Records Sampler Artist: Various Artists Distribution: United States Record Label: Third Mind

- 5:26 BIO-MECHANIC - Front Line Assembly
- 4:42 BLESSED IS THE BURNING ROOM - Controlled Bleeding
- 5:54 TARGETED - Intermix
- 5:05 ANGELCHROME - In The Nursery
- 3:44 EXHAUST INHIBITS - Will
- 4:40 BURN-UP - Solar Enemy
- 6:56 EUPHORIC - Delerium
- 5:58 HOTEL X - Edward Ka-Spel
- 5:13 RAIN WASHED - Eden
