= Zonata =

Power metal band from Sweden

- Origin: Borås, Sweden
- Genres: Power metal
- Years active: 1998–2003
- Labels: Century Media
- Past members: Johannes Nyberg; John Nyberg; Niclas Karlsson; Mattias Asplund; Mikael Hornqvist; Johan Elving; Daniel Dalhqvist; Henrik Carlsson

Zonata was a Swedish power metal band originating from Borås. They formed in 1998 and recorded three albums with label Century Media before calling a split up in 2003. Their lyrics draw heavily on mythology and life struggles. They are known by most for their heavy drums and cutting guitar riffs.

== Members ==
=== Final lineup ===
- Johannes Nyberg - vocals and keyboards
- John Nyberg - guitar
- Niclas Karlsson - guitar
- Mattias Asplund - bass
- Mikael Hornqvist - drums

=== Former ===
- Johan Elving - bass (1998–1999)
- Daniel Dalhqvist - drums (1998)
- Henrik Carlsson - guitar (1998–2000)

The band broke up in 2003 when Johannes Nyberg and John Nyberg left the band.

== Discography ==
- Copenhagen Tapes (1998 Demo)
- Tunes of Steel (1999)
- Reality (2001)
- Buried Alive (2002)
- Exceptions (2007 - Compilation)
