= Disbelief =

German heavy metal band

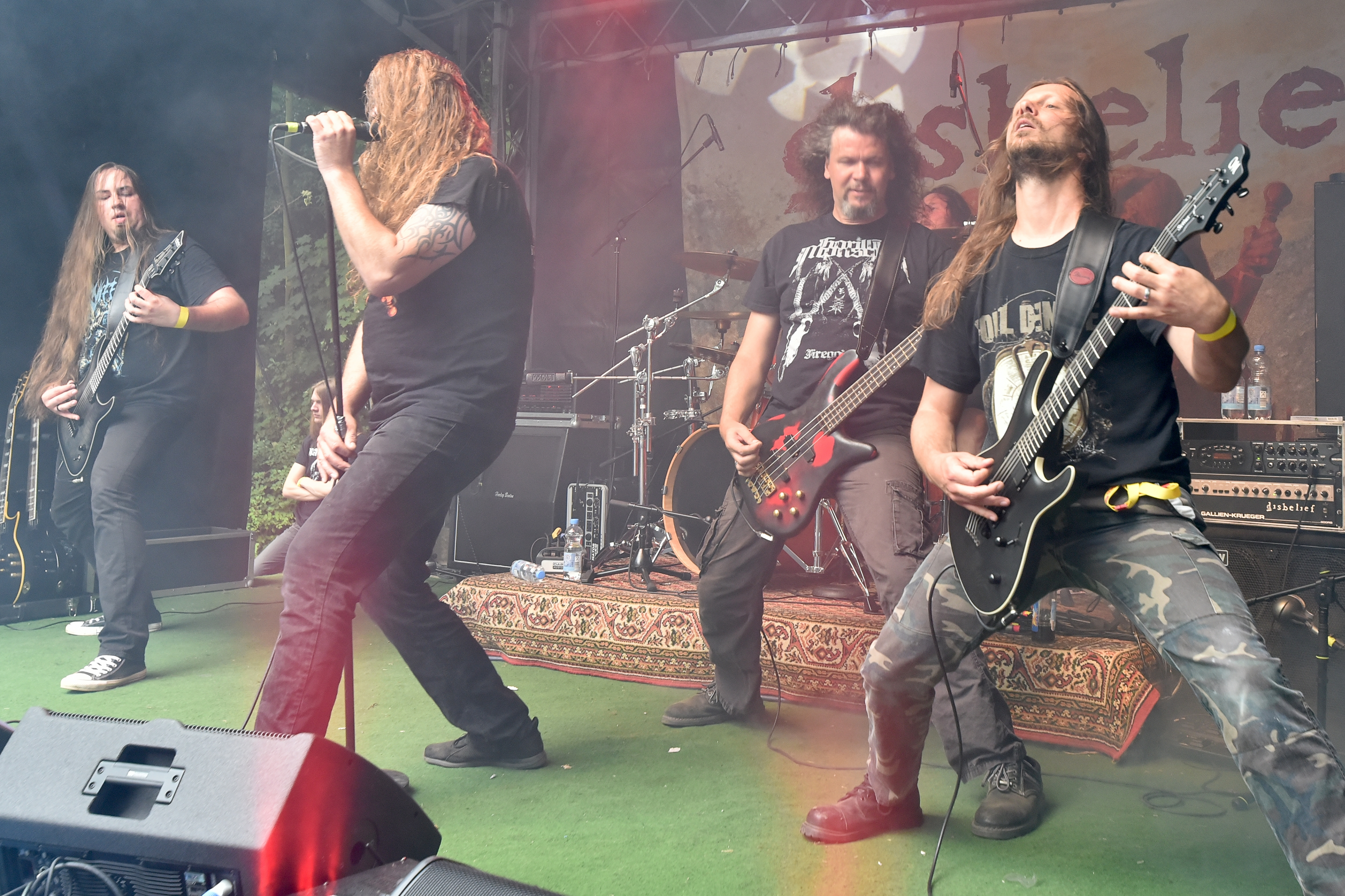
- Disbelief performing in 2017

Background information
- Origin: Hesse, Germany
- Genres: Death metal, sludge metal
- Years active: 1990–present
- Labels: Grind Syndicate, Massacre, Nuclear Blast
- Members: Karsten Jäger; Jochen Trunk; Cornelius Althammer; Alexander Hagenauer; Wolfgang Rothbauer
- Past members: Markus Knap; Denis Musiol; Jan-Dirk Löffler; Olly Lenz; Tommy Fritsch
- Website: disbelief.de

Disbelief (sometimes decapitalized to "disbelief") is a German death metal band from Hesse. Their music has melancholic tendencies and is influenced by other genres, including sludge metal and doom metal.

== History ==
The band was formed in 1990, but did not have a solid line-up for several years. They began with Karsten Jäger, Oliver Lenz, and drummer Markus Gnap, with guitarist/bassist Denis Musiol joining later. They released their first demo the following year. After two more demo tapes, five years, and the replacement of Gnap and Musiol with Tommy Fritsch, Jochen Trunk, and Kai Bergerin, they released their self-titled album in 1997. Their second album, Infected, was released in 1998. A year later, they replaced Fritsch with Jan-Dirk Löffler and signed a new contract with Massacre Records. After a few more albums, they signed to Nuclear Blast, which distributed their 2004 record, Spreading the Rage, to North America and helped them gain a wider fanbase. After reinstating Fritsch into the band, they released 66Sick in 2005, also in North America. Lenz left the band in late 2006 and Jonas Khalil replaced him. The band's seventh album, Navigator, was released in late February 2007.

Following the release of their eighth album, Protected Hell, in 2009, and their debut EP, Heal!, in 2010, singer Karsten Jager joined fellow German death metal band Morgoth as their new lead vocalist in 2014, following Marc Grewe's last-minute departure, providing vocals for their reunion album, Ungod, released in 2015. He performed with Morgoth and Disbelief for the next several years, until the former's official permanent breakup in 2020, during which time the band released their first album in eight years, The Symbol of Death, in 2017, and their tenth studio album, The Ground Collapses, in 2020.

The band's eleventh studio album, Killing Karma, was released in 2024.

== Members ==
=== Current members ===
- Karsten "Jagger" Jäger – vocals (1990–present)
- Jochen "Joe" Trunk – bass (1995–present)
- David "Dave" Renner – guitars (2013–present)
- Fabian "Fab" Regmann – drums (2014–present)

=== Previous members ===
- Markus Gnap – drums (1990–1994)
- Marius Pack – guitars (1990–1994)
- Oliver "Olly" Lenz – guitars (1990–2006)
- Denis Musiol – guitars, bass (1992–1995)
- Kai Bergerin – drums (1994–2010)
- Tommy Fritsch – guitars (1995–1999, 2004–2007)
- Jan-Dirk Löffler – guitars (2000–2004)
- Jonas Khalil – guitars (2007–2008)
- Witali Weber – guitars (2007–2010)
- Alejandro Varela – guitars (2009)
- Cornelius Althammer – drums (2010–2011)
- Wolfgang Rothbauer – guitars (2010–2013)
- Alexander Hagenauer – guitars (2010–2017)
- Sandro "Drumster" Schulze – drums (2013–2014)

== Discography ==
- Disbelief (1997)
- Infected (1999)
- Worst Enemy (2001)
- Shine (2002)
- Spreading the Rage (2003)
- 66Sick (2005)
- Navigator (2007)
- Protected Hell (2009)
- Heal (2010)
- The Symbol of Death (2017)
- The Ground Collapses (2020)
- Killing Karma (2024)
