= Issue VI =

Studio album by Dew-Scented
- Released: June 20, 2005
- Recorded: February 2005
- Genre: Thrash metal, death metal
- Length: 45:50
- Label: Nuclear Blast
- Producer: Dew-Scented

Dew-Scented chronology
Impact (2003)	Issue VI (2005)	Incinerate (2007)

Issue VI is the sixth full-length album by the German thrash metal/death metal band Dew-Scented.

A special edition, limited to 5000 worldwide, comes with a bonus DVD, with 17 live tracks from various shows between 2002-2005, and a video clip for the song "Turn to Ash". A colored vinyl edition was released by Benihana Records.

== Composition ==
The songs "Processing Life", "Out of the Self", and "Vortex" has been characterized as "maniacal creations" with racing rhythms of "utterly blinding speeds and almost superhuman intensity".

== Reception ==
Professional ratings
Review scores
Source	Rating
AllMusic	3.5/5 stars

Eduardo Rivadavia, writing for AllMusic, described the album as the "most frantic and no-holds-barred" neo-death metal/trash metal. Rivadavia appreciated the songs "Turn to Ash", "Bled Dry", and "In Defeat" for their "spidery melodic guitar lines". However, he had mixed feelings about the album length, pointing out that it "takes a real glutton for speed to actually sit through and digest these dangerously repetitive blasts", and Dew-Scented "far exceed[ed] the unofficial half-hour limit imposed on such releases by Slayer's form-defining Reign in Blood". Rivadavia summed up his experience as "impressive enough, but truly for speed-freaks only".

== Track listing ==
1. "Processing Life" – 4:09
2. "Rituals of Time" – 5:06
3. "Turn to Ash" – 3:08
4. "Ruins of Hope" – 4:12
5. "Out of the Self" – 3:41
6. "The Prison of Reason" – 4:49
7. "Bled Dry" – 3:57
8. "In Defeat" – 3:52
9. "Never to Return" – 4:22
10. "Vortex" – 4:15
11. "Conceptual End" – 3:18
12. "Evil Dead" (Zeke Cover) – 1:01

Bonus Tracks:

1. "Full-Blown Revenge" (Japanese Bonus Track)
2. "The Torrent" (American Bonus Track) – 4:31

== Personnel ==
- Leffe Jensen – vocals
- Hendrik Bache – guitar
- Alexander Pahl – bass
- Uwe Werning – drums
