= List of Holy Moses members =

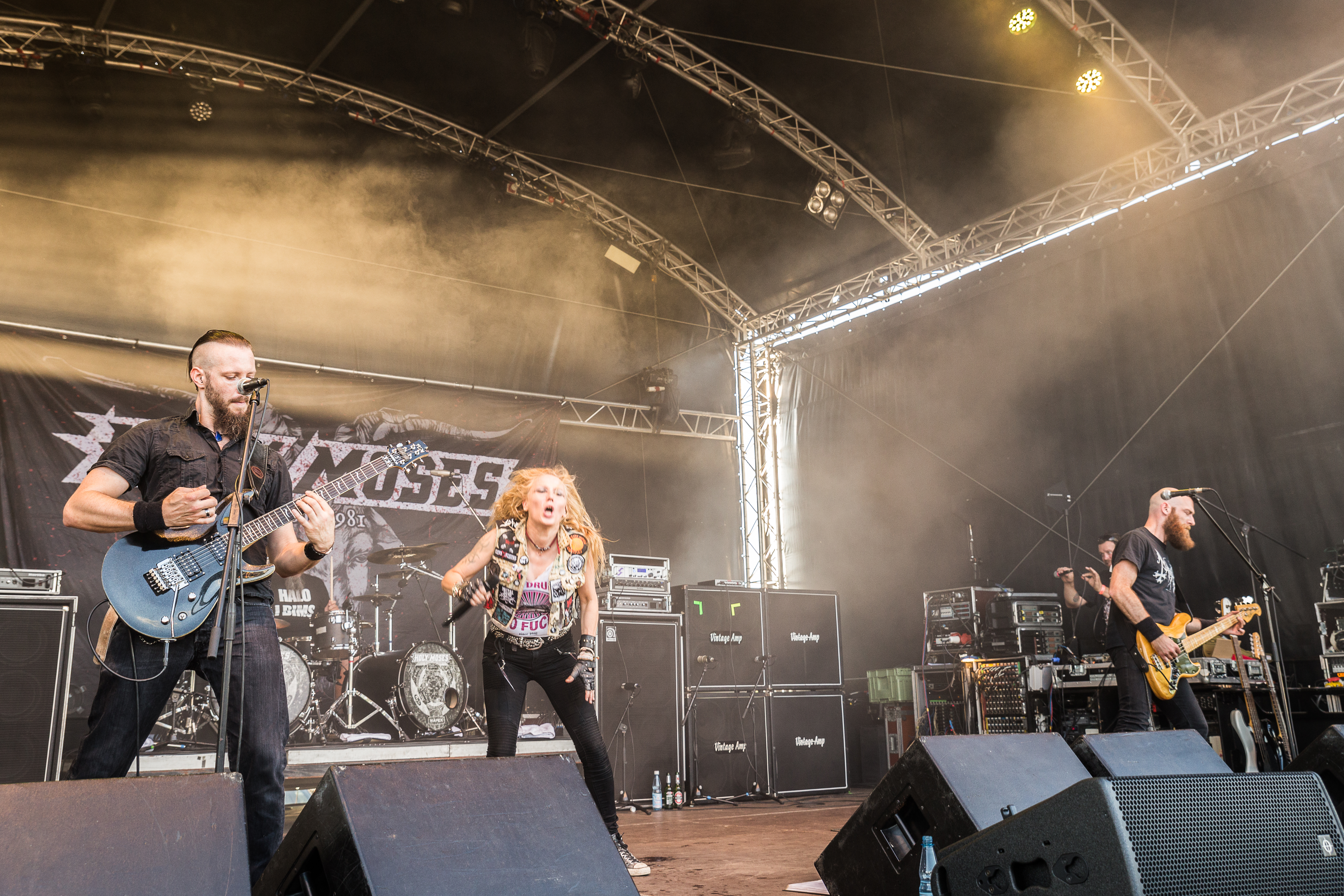
Holy Moses performing in 2018

Holy Moses were a German thrash metal band from Aachen. Formed in October 1980, the group was originally a trio consisting of guitarist and vocalist Jochen Fünders, bassist Ramon Brüssler, and drummer Peter Vonderstein. After a string of early lineup changes, the band settled on its first consistent lineup in December 1981 with the addition of vocalist Sabina Hirtz (later Classen), alongside guitarist Andy Classen, Brüssler and drummer Paul Linzenich. The current lineup of Holy Moses includes Sabina Classen, bassist Thomas Neitsch (since 2008), drummer Gerd Lücking (since 2011) and guitarist Peter Geltat (since 2012).

== History ==
=== 1980–1986 ===
Holy Moses was formed on 17 October 1980 by Jochen Fünders, Ramon Brüssler and Peter Vonderstein. The original trio debuted with the demo Black Metal Masters before the end of the year. Shortly after a show on 17 October 1981 to mark the band's first anniversary, Fünders was replaced by vocalist Wolfgang "Iggy" Dammers and guitarist Andy Classen (after a brief tenure for a Belgian guitarist called Jean-Claude), while Vonderstein also made way for Paul Linzenich. The new lineup released a self-titled second demo, before Dammers was replaced by Classen's girlfriend Sabina Hirtz on 3 December 1981. Three more demos followed (Satan's Angel, Call of the Demon and Heavy Metal), and Hirtz and Classen married in late 1983, before Linzenich left at the beginning of 1984 to return to university. When Sabina also briefly left, she introduced the band to her brother Tom and his drummer bandmate, who took over from the departed members for "about four weeks" before Brüssler asked Hirtz to leave due to stylistic differences.

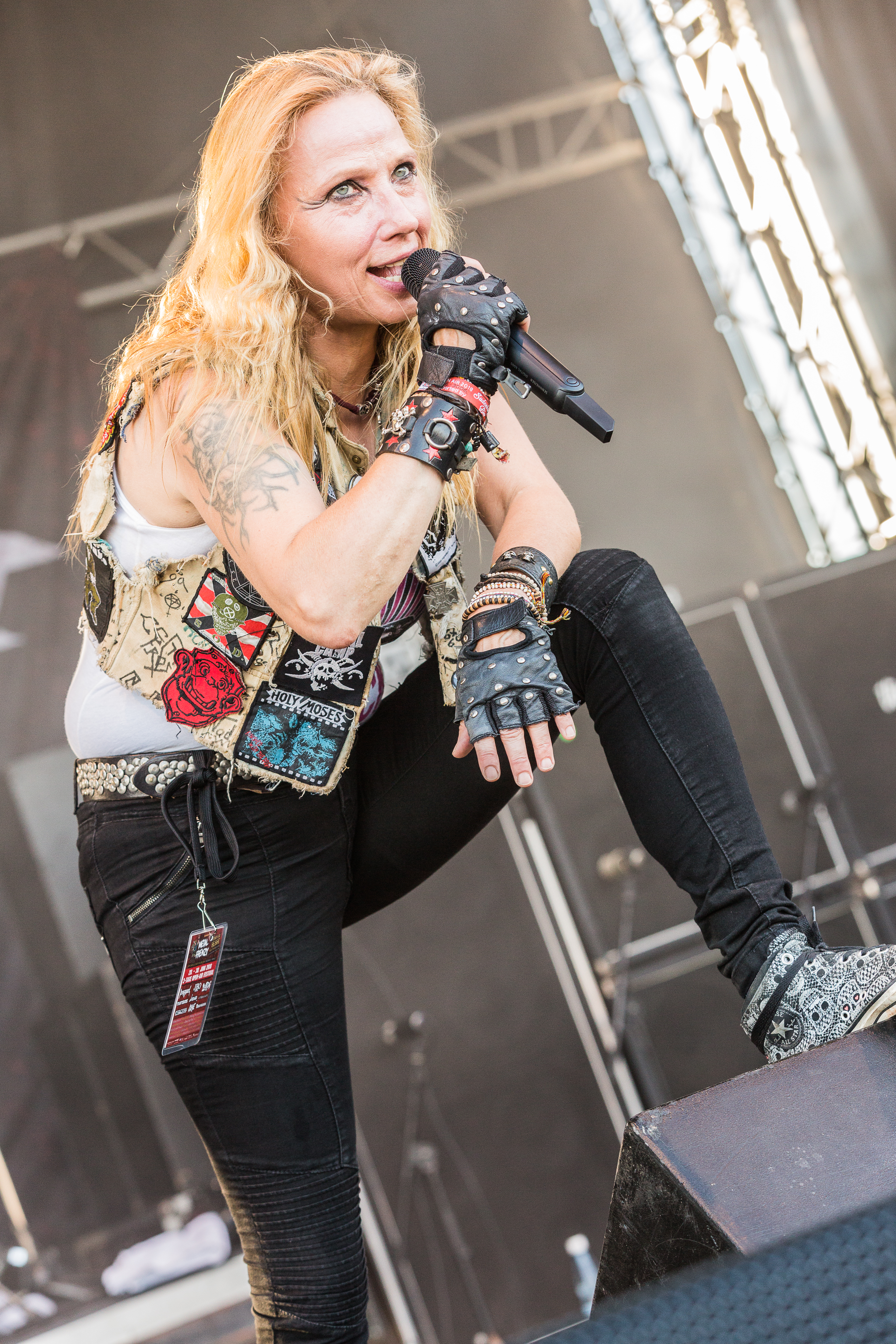
Sabina Classen (then Hirtz) has been the lead singer of Holy Moses since December 1981.

When Sabina initially declined a return to Holy Moses, the band briefly worked with another female singer (known by Sabina's recollection as "Katrin or Katja"), before Sabina returned and the band brought in new drummer Jörg "Snake" Heins. The new lineup recorded demos Death Bells and Walpurgisnight, before Heins was forced by his parents to leave the group to focus on his university studies. He was replaced in November 1985 by Herbert Dreger, who debuted on The Bitch demo recorded at the end of the year. The band signed with producer Ralph Hubert's AAARRGG Records in February 1986 and subsequently recorded their debut full-length album Queen of Siam, which was released that spring. Shortly after the album was recorded, Dreger was fired after attending a Whitesnake show on the same night as a planned support slot for Agent Steel.

=== 1986–1994 ===
Dreger was replaced in July 1986 by 19-year-old Uli Kusch. In September, founding bassist and band manager Ramon Büssler left the band, with Andre Chapelier taking his place by November. The new lineup released Finished with the Dogs in July 1987, at which pointed Georgie Symbos was brought in as a temporary second guitarist. By September, just before a European tour, Holy Moses had lost Chapelier after a dispute between him and producer Ralph Hubert, replaced by Johan Susant for the rest of the year.

After the 1987 run of shows was over, touring members Symbos and Susant left Holy Moses. The band returned early the next year with new members Thilo Hermann on guitar and Thomas Becker on bass, who performed on the band's next album The New Machine of Liechtenstein. After the album's recording, however, Hermann decided to return to his previous band; the group began rehearsing with cover art designer Rainer Laws, who became an official member early the following year. By January 1990, however, Laws had decided to leave on the eve of a tour to focus on his design work, after initially being unavailable due to illness. The group remained a four-piece.

In May 1990 the band released World Chaos, which marked the last contributions of Becker and Kusch. They were replaced for tour dates starting in June by Benny "Speed" Schnell and Guido "Atomic Steif" Richter, respectively. Terminal Terror followed in 1991, before Sven "Meff" Herwig replaced Steif in 1992 for the recording of Reborn Dogs. For 1994's No Matter What's the Cause, former Anthrax bassist Dan Lilker replaced Schnell. Shortly after the album's release, Holy Moses disbanded.

=== Since 2000 ===
After a six-year absence, Holy Moses was reformed in late 2000 by Sabina Classen without Andy. With guitarists Jörn Schubert and Franky Brotz, drummer Julien Schmidt, and founding member Jochen Fünders on bass, the band released the EP Master of Disaster in 2001, before Fünders left due to family commitments and was replaced by Andreas Libera. The band's eighth full-length album Disorder of the Order followed in 2002, before Schubert was replaced by Michael Hankel in the summer. By mid-2003, Libera had been replaced by Alex De Blanco. The new lineup released Strength Power Will Passion in 2005, before De Blanco and Schmidt were replaced that summer by Robert "Ozzy" Freese and Asgard Niels, respectively. Hankel also became the band's sole guitarist at the same time.

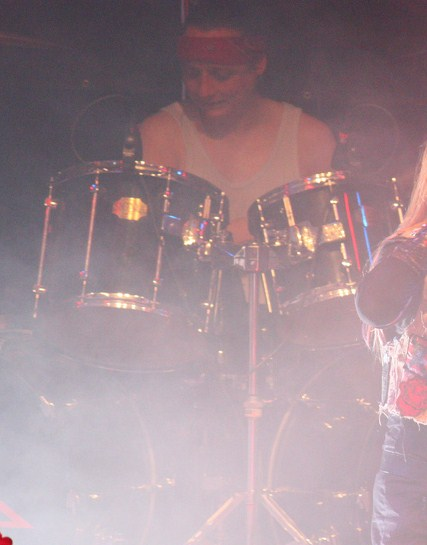
Drummer Guido "Atomic Steif" Richter rejoined Holy Moses in February 2007 after a brief tenure in the early 1990s.

In July 2006, Freese was forced to step back from Holy Moses due to being "reportedly very ill". The next month, the band announced that he would return after a stay in a psychiatric hospital, during which time their live performances would feature programmed bass, as several potential replacements were unable to take over. Later in the year, Oliver Jaath took over from Freese. Before the end of 2006, Niels decided to leave Holy Moses due to "personal differences as well as totally different perspectives in musical progress". He was replaced in February 2007 by returning drummer Atomic Steif. The new lineup began working on material for Agony of Death, which was completed with new bassist Thomas Neitsch who was officially added in May 2008, with Jaath switching to guitar. Steif remained until July 2011, when he was replaced by Gerd Lücking.

After the completion of their 11th studio album 30th Anniversary: In the Power of Now, Hankel left Holy Moses in March 2012 due to "personal reasons" and was replaced by Peter Geltat, who had featured on the recording. Geltat became the band's only guitarist the following autumn, when Jaath departed before the recording of Redefined Mayhem.

== Members ==
=== Current ===
Image	Name	Years active	Instruments	Release contributions
	Sabina Classen-Hirtz	1981–1984; 1984–1994; 2000–present	lead vocals	all Holy Moses releases from Satan's Angel (1982) onwards
	Thomas Neitsch	2008–present	bass; backing vocals	Agony of Death (2008); 30th Anniversary: In the Power of Now (2012); Redefined Mayhem (2014)
	Gerd Lücking	2011–present	drums	30th Anniversary: In the Power of Now (2012); Redefined Mayhem (2014)
	Peter Geltat	2012–present	guitar; backing vocals	30th Anniversary: In the Power of Now (2012); Redefined Mayhem (2014)

=== Former ===
Image	Name	Years active	Instruments	Release contributions
	Ramon Brüssler	1980–1986	bass	all Holy Moses releases from Black Metal Masters (1980) to Queen of Siam (1986)
	Jochen Fünders	1980–1981; 2000–2001	vocals; guitar; bass	Black Metal Masters (1980); Master of Disaster (2001)
	Peter Vonderstein	1980–1981	drums	Black Metal Masters (1980)
	Paul Linzenich	1981–1984	drums	all Holy Moses releases from Holy Moses (1981) to Heavy Metal (1983)
	Wolfgang "Iggy" Dammers	1981	lead vocals	Holy Moses (1981)
	Andy Classen	1981–1994	guitar; backing vocals	all Holy Moses releases from Holy Moses (1981) to Disorder of the Order (2002)
	Unknown drummer	1984	drums	none
	Tom Hirtz	1984	lead vocals	none
	Unknown vocalist	1984	lead vocals	none
	Jörg "Snake" Heins	1984–1985	drums	Death Bells (1984); Walpurgisnight (1985)
	Herbert Dreger	1985–1986 (died 2012)	drums	The Bitch (1986); Queen of Siam (1986)
	Uli Kusch	1986–1990	drums; backing vocals	all Holy Moses releases from Finished with the Dogs (1987) to World Chaos (1990)
	Andre Chapelier	1986–1987	bass	Finished with the Dogs (1987); Road Crew (1987)
	Georgie Symbos	1987 (touring)	guitar	none
	Johan Susant	1987 (touring)	bass	none
	Thomas Becker	1988–1990	bass	The New Machine of Liechtenstein (1989); World Chaos (1990)
	Thilo Hermann	1988	guitar	The New Machine of Liechtenstein (1989)
	Rainer Laws	1989–1990	guitar	none
	Benny "Speed" Schnell	1990–1993	bass	Terminal Terror (1991); Reborn Dogs (1992)
	Guido "Atomic Steif" Richter	1990–1992; 2007–2011 (died 2025)	drums	Terminal Terror (1991); Agony of Death (2008)
	Sven "Meff" Herwig	1992–1994	drums	Reborn Dogs (1992); No Matter What's the Cause (1994)
	Dan Lilker	1993–1994	bass; piano	No Matter What's the Cause (1994)
	Franky Brotz	2000–2005	guitar	Master of Disaster (2001); Disorder of the Order (2002); Strength Power Will Passion (2005)
	Julien Schmidt	2000–2005	drums	Master of Disaster (2001); Disorder of the Order (2002); Strength Power Will Passion (2005)
	Jörn Schubert	2000–2002	guitar	Master of Disaster (2001); Disorder of the Order (2002)
	Andreas Libera	2001–2003	bass	Disorder of the Order (2002)
	Michael "Michi" Hankel	2002–2012	guitar; backing vocals	Strength Power Will Passion (2005); Agony of Death (2008); 30th Anniversary: In the Power of Now (2012)
	Alex De Blanco	2003–2005	bass	Strength Power Will Passion (2005)
	Asgard Niels	2005–2006	drums	none
	Robert "Ozzy" Freese	2005–2006	bass	none
	Oliver "Olli" Jaath	2006–2013	bass (2006–2008); guitar (2008–2013); backing vocals	Agony of Death (2008); 30th Anniversary: In the Power of Now (2012)

== Lineups ==
Period	Members	Releases
October 1980 – October 1981	Jochen Fünders – vocals, guitar; Ramon Brüssler – bass; Peter Vonderstein – drums	Black Metal Masters (1980)
October – November 1981	Iggy Dammers – vocals; Jean-Claude – guitar; Ramon Brüssler – bass; Paul Linzenich – drums	none
November – December 1981	Iggy Dammers – lead vocals; Andy Classen – guitar, backing vocals; Ramon Brüssler – bass; Paul Linzenich – drums	Holy Moses (1981)
December 1981 – early 1984	Sabina Classen – lead vocals; Andy Classen – guitar, backing vocals; Ramon Brüssler – bass; Paul Linzenich – drums	Satan's Angel (1982); Call of the Demon (1983); Heavy Metal (1983)
Early 1984	Tom Hirtz – lead vocals; Andy Classen – guitar, backing vocals; Ramon Brüssler – bass; Unknown drummer – drums	none
Spring 1984	Unknown vocalist – lead vocals; Andy Classen – guitar, backing vocals; Ramon Brüssler – bass; Unknown drummer – drums	none
Spring 1984 – fall 1985	Sabina Classen – lead vocals; Andy Classen – guitar, backing vocals; Ramon Brüssler – bass; Jörg "Snake" Heins – drums	Death Bells (1984); Walpurgisnight (1985)
November 1985 – May 1986	Sabina Classen – lead vocals; Andy Classen – guitar, backing vocals; Ramon Brüssler – bass; Herbert Dreger – drums	The Bitch (1986); Queen of Siam (1986)
July – September 1986	Sabina Classen – lead vocals; Andy Classen – guitar, backing vocals; Ramon Brüssler – bass; Uli Kusch – drums, backing vocals	none
November 1986 – July 1987	Sabina Classen – lead vocals; Andy Classen – guitar, backing vocals; Andre Chapelier – bass; Uli Kusch – drums, backing vocals	Finished with the Dogs (1987); Road Crew (1987)
July – September 1987	Sabina Classen – lead vocals; Andy Classen – guitar, backing vocals; George Symbos – guitar (touring); Andre Chapelier – bass; Uli Kusch – drums, backing vocals	none
September – December 1987	Sabina Classen – lead vocals; Andy Classen – guitar, backing vocals; George Symbos – guitar (touring); Johan Susant – bass (touring); Uli Kusch – drums, backing vocals	none
Early – November 1988	Sabina Classen – lead vocals; Andy Classen – guitar, backing vocals; Thilo Hermann – guitar; Thomas Becker – bass; Uli Kusch – drums, backing vocals	The New Machine of Liechtenstein (1989)
Early 1989 – January 1990	Sabina Classen – lead vocals; Andy Classen – guitar, backing vocals; Rainer Laws – guitar; Thomas Becker – bass; Uli Kusch – drums, backing vocals	none
January – spring 1990	Sabina Classen – lead vocals; Andy Classen – guitar, backing vocals; Thomas Becker – bass; Uli Kusch – drums, backing vocals	World Chaos (1990)
1990–1992	Sabina Classen – lead vocals; Andy Classen – guitar, backing vocals; Benny Schnell – bass; Atomic Steif – drums	Terminal Terror (1991)
1992–1993	Sabina Classen – lead vocals; Andy Classen – guitar, backing vocals; Benny Schnell – bass; Sven Herwig – drums	Reborn Dogs (1992)
1993–1994	Sabina Classen – lead vocals; Andy Classen – guitar, backing vocals; Dan Lilker – bass, piano; Sven Herwig – drums	No Matter What's the Cause (1994)
Band inactive late 1994 – late 2000
Late 2000 – early 2001	Sabina Classen – lead vocals; Jörn Schubert – guitar; Franky Brotz – guitar; Jochen Fünders – bass; Julien Schmidt – drums	Master of Disaster (2001)
Spring 2001 – summer 2002	Sabina Classen – lead vocals; Franky Brotz – guitar; Jörn Schubert – guitar; Andreas Libera – bass; Julien Schmidt – drums	Disorder of the Order (2002)
Summer 2002 – mid-2003	Sabina Classen – lead vocals; Franky Brotz – guitar; Michael Hankel – guitar, backing vocals; Andreas Libera – bass; Julien Schmidt – drums	none
Mid-2003 – summer 2005	Sabina Classen – lead vocals; Franky Brotz – guitar; Michael Hankel – guitar, backing vocals; Alex De Blanco – bass; Julien Schmidt – drums	Strength Power Will Passion (2005)
Summer 2005 – July 2006	Sabina Classen – lead vocals; Michael Hankel – guitar, backing vocals; Ozzy Freese – bass; Asgard Niels – drums	none
Summer 2006	Sabina Classen – lead vocals; Michael Hankel – guitar, backing vocals; Asgard Niels – drums	none
Fall – late 2006	Sabina Classen – lead vocals; Michael Hankel – guitar, backing vocals; Oliver Jaath – bass, backing vocals; Asgard Niels – drums	none
February 2007 – May 2008	Sabina Classen – lead vocals; Michael Hankel – guitar, backing vocals; Oliver Jaath – bass, backing vocals; Atomic Steif – drums	none
May 2008 – July 2011	Sabina Classen – lead vocals; Michael Hankel – guitar, backing vocals; Oliver Jaath – guitar, backing vocals; Thomas Neitsch – bass, backing vocals; Atomic Steif – drums	Agony of Death (2008)
July 2011 – March 2012	Sabina Classen – lead vocals; Michael Hankel – guitar, backing vocals; Oliver Jaath – guitar, backing vocals; Thomas Neitsch – bass, backing vocals; Gerd Lücking – drums	30th Anniversary: In the Power of Now (2012)
March 2012 – fall 2013	Sabina Classen – lead vocals; Oliver Jaath – guitar, backing vocals; Peter Geltat – guitar, backing vocals; Thomas Neitsch – bass, backing vocals; Gerd Lücking – drums	none
Fall 2013 – present	Sabina Classen – lead vocals; Peter Geltat – guitar, backing vocals; Thomas Neitsch – bass, backing vocals; Gerd Lücking – drums	Redefined Mayhem (2014)
