= Dynamo Open Air =

Netherlands music festival

Dynamo Metal Fest
- Genre: Metal
- Frequency: Annual
- Venue: IJssportcentrum, Eindhoven
- Years active: 1986–2005, 2008–2010, 2015–present
- Capacity: 10,000
- Website: dynamo-metalfest.nl
- Former names: Dynamo Open Air (1986–2005), Dynamo Outdoor (2008–2010)

Dynamo Open Air is a festival in the Netherlands that was held (almost) every year between 1986 and 2005. It was reborn in 2008 as Dynamo Outdoor and in 2015 as Dynamo Metal Fest.

== History ==
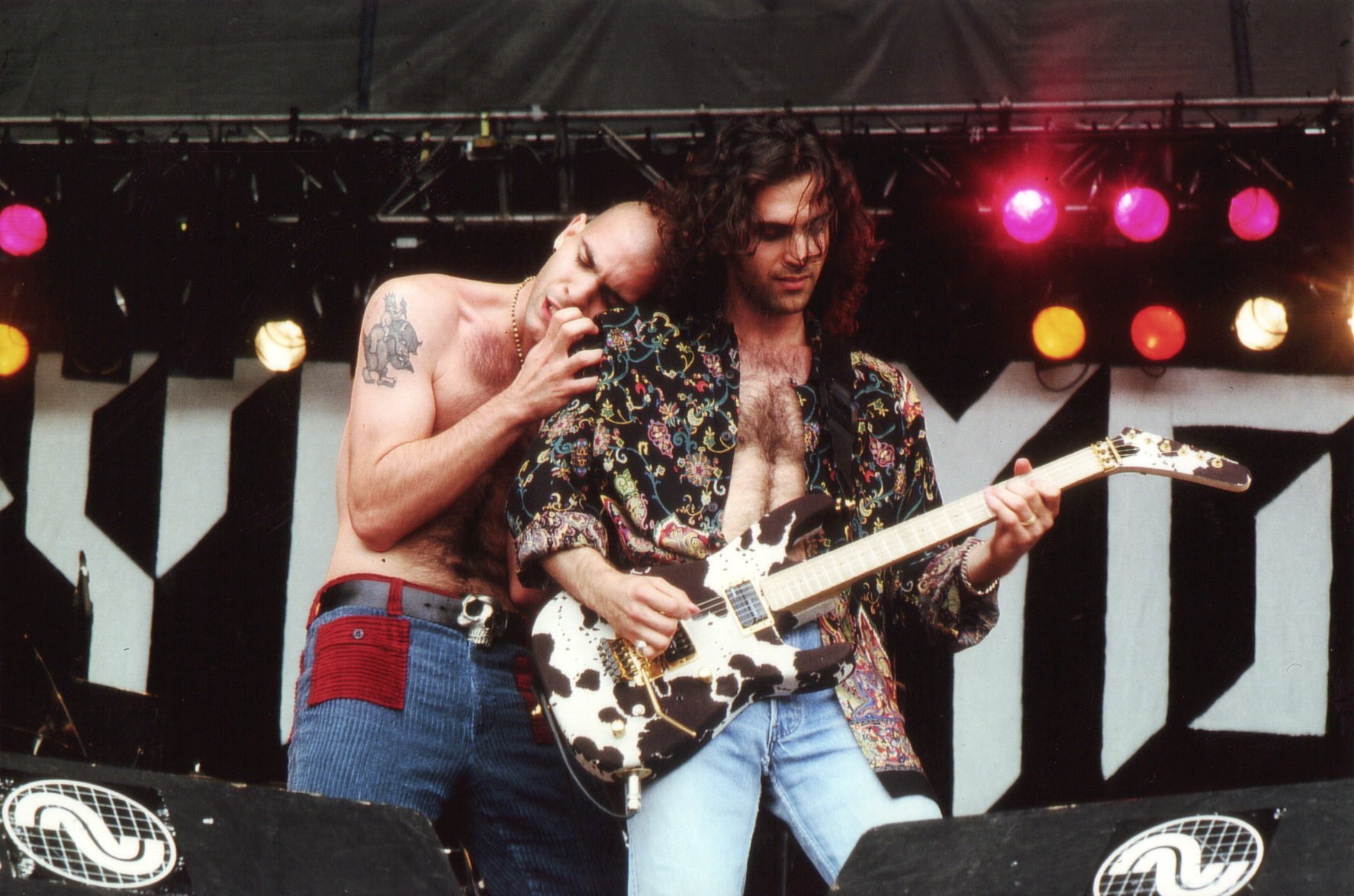
Dweezil & Ahmet Zappa performing live at Dynamo Open Air in 1993

Dynamo Open Air was originally held in 1986 to celebrate the fifth anniversary of the Dynamo rock club in Eindhoven. It began with 5,000 people in the Dynamo parking lot. From 1988 to 1992, it was held at a local ice rink with 22,000 capacity. In 1993, the festival was moved to the Eindhoven military airport (Vliegbasis Welschap). In 1994, it became a three-day festival.

In 1995, Dynamo Open Air reported 118,000 attendees. To this day, it is still the largest multi-day open air festival ever held in the Netherlands. This caused too much pressure on the Dutch infrastructure, leading to some of the longest recorded traffic jams in the history of the Netherlands. The lines to drive in were so long that people infamously barbecued bratwursts on the highway.

As a result, the municipality forced the festival to limit its capacity to 60,000 in 1996. In 1998, the festival site and the airport had to be moved in order to build 6,000 new houses. The festival site is now the Eindhoven residential area of Meerhoven. The festival returned to the ice rink in 1998, with a halved capacity of 30,000. In 1999, it was held at Mierlo, but it was located next to a garbage dump with a noticeable odor, and the parking situation was insufficient. So it moved again in 2000 to the Goffertpark in Nijmegen. However, it was the first DOA held outside the province of North Brabant, and it can only be one day long. So the organisers kept searching for a suitable location.

In 2001, the organisation thought they had found a site where the festival could return on a yearly basis, near the town of Lichtenvoorde. However, the threat of foot-and-mouth disease caused trouble, and Dynamo Open Air had to be cancelled. In 2002 it returned, at the site of the Bospop festival, but 2003 was another year without a Dynamo festival, because it would violate a recently passed law about animal protection during breeding season. For 2004, the festival returned to Nijmegen, at the same location where it took place in 2000. In 2005, the festival used the site of the Dauwpop festival, and the reunited Anthrax headlined the stage.

In an attempt to revitalise the festival, the current organization of the Dynamo youth center decided to change the festival's name from Dynamo Open Air to Dynamo Outdoor. In 2008, the first Dynamo Outdoor festival was held in the centre of Eindhoven, with bands such as Mad Sin, Anathema and Born From Pain performing. The festival was once again held in Eindhoven in the following year, with Destine, Stahlzeit, Asphyx, Textures, The Butcher and Municipal Waste on the bill.

The revival of the festival occurred with a new name as Dynamo Metal Fest, which has taken place every year since 2015. The festival had taken place traditionally on the second or third Saturday in July from 2015 to 2018; for the 2019 edition, it was converted into a two-day festival. After the 2020 edition was cancelled because of the COVID-19 pandemic, Dynamo Metal Fest was scheduled to return in August 2021, however again cancelled due to the COVID-19 pandemic. The Dynamo Metal Fest was again held in August 2022.

=== Live recordings ===
Testament recorded their Live at Eindhoven EP in 1987 at the last Dynamo Open Air held at its original location (the parking lot) before the festival moved to The IJsbaan. In 1995, Nailbomb had their performance recorded at the festival and it was released as Proud to Commit Commercial Suicide the same year it was recorded. It was released by Roadrunner Records In 2005, live footage of the performance was released on DVD and it was called Live at Dynamo. It was also released by Roadrunner Records. In May 1998, guest band Death recorded stock footage of their performance. Three years later, in an effort to raise money to pay for Chuck Schuldiner's cancer treatment, the footage was limitedly released in October 2001 by Nuclear Blast on CD and DVD formats under the name Live In Eindhoven, two months before Schuldiner's ultimate demise.

== Line-ups and dates ==
=== Dynamo Open Air ===
==== 1986 ====
Sunday September 7

Joshua
Paul Di'Anno's Battlezone
Satan
Chariot
Angel Witch
Onslaught
Avalon

Cancelled shows : Lääz Rockit

==== 1987 ====
Monday June 8

Stryper
Testament
Destruction
Vengeance
Atomkraft
Mad Max

Cancelled shows : Agent Steel (replaced by Testament)

==== 1988 ====
Monday May 23

Exodus
Lȧȧz Rockit
Candlemass
Toxik
Sabbat
Paradox

==== 1989 ====
Monday May 15

Savatage
Armored Saint
Sacred Reich
Forbidden
Sleeze Beez
Holy Moses
Fatal Destiny

==== 1990 ====
Monday June 4

Death Angel
Sacred Reich
Sepultura
Vicious Rumors
Trouble
Mordred

==== 1991 ====
Monday May 20

Metal Church
Primus
Armored Saint
Morbid Angel
Extreme
Saigon Kick
Obituary
Ignorance
Psychotic Waltz

==== 1992 ====
Sunday June 7

Prong
Rollins Band
Mordred
Paradise Lost
The Organization
My Sister's Machine
Pestilence
Skyclad
Love on Ice

Rollins Band was a last-minute replacement for Corrosion of Conformity.

==== 1993 ====
Saturday May 29

Anthrax
Suicidal Tendencies
Mind Funk
Biohazard
Monster Magnet
Dweezil Zappa
Freak of Nature
Fear Factory
Nudeswirl

Sunday May 30

Mercyful Fate
Trouble
Annihilator
Gorefest
Fudge Tunnel
Kong
Wool
Z

Cancelled shows: Therapy?

==== 1994 ====
Friday May 20 (Warm-Up)

Forbidden
Gorefest
Vicious Rumors

Saturday May 21

Prong
Clawfinger
Sick of It All
Jackyl
The Organization
Skintrade
Die Krupps
Cynic
Last Crack
Nerve

Sunday May 22

Danzig
Urban Dance Squad
Kyuss
Life of Agony
Pride & Glory
Skyclad
Sleeze Beez
The Obsessed
B-Thong
Skrew

==== 1995 ====
Friday June 2
Campsite	Skatefest
Tiamat; My Dying Bride; Skyclad; Mary Beats Jane; Sun; Shihad; Overdose; Rape; Waving Corn; Hate Squad; Schweisser; Brotherhood Foundation	Rich Kids on LSD; Snapcase; Earth Crisis; Undeclinable Ambuscade

Saturday June 3
Mainstage	Skatefest	Campsite
Paradise Lost; Type O Negative; Dog Eat Dog; Grip Inc. Warrior Soul; Fear Factory; Nailbomb; Mental Hippie Blood; Madball; Nevermore	Absconded; Horace Pinker; NRA; Blitz Babies	Crash Worship; 35007

Sunday June 4
Mainstage	Skatefest
Biohazard; Machine Head; Life of Agony; Trouble; Dub War; Downset. Eleven Pictures	Orange 9mm Burning Heads; Strawman; No Fun At All

==== 1996 ====
Friday May 24
Campsite	Skatefest
Neurosis; Anathema; Pitchshifter; Orphanage; Altar; Skrew; Transpunk; Dearly Beheaded; Dreamgrinder; Spiritual Beggars; Merauder; Torque; Gurd; Thumb	Slapshot; Ryker's; Skippies; Unsane

Saturday May 25
Mainstage	Skatefest
Venom; Gorefest; Savatage; The Gathering; Pennywise; Sacred Reich; Shelter; Voivod; Galactic Cowboys; White Devil; Stuck Mojo	Down by Law; Millencolin; Strung Out; 7Zuma7

Sunday May 26
Mainstage	Skatefest
Slayer; Kreatief Met Kirk; Osdorp Possé & Nembrionic; CIV; Channel Zero; Pro-Pain; The Exploited; Drain	Shelter; 59 Times the Pain; Satanic Surfers; Cooper; Bambix

Cancelled shows : Halford (replaced by Sacred Reich)

==== 1997 ====
Friday May 16
Campsite	Skatefest
Rockbitch; Therion; Samael; Pist.On; Sentenced; Coal Chamber; Skinlab; Totenmond; Within Temptation; Keaton; Sundown	Ignite; SNFU $400 Suits; Ni Hao

Saturday May 17
Mainstage	Campsite	Skatefest
Type O Negative; Machine Head; Sick of It All; Exodus; Moonspell; Orphanage; Amorphis; Entombed; Thumb; Slo Burn; Limp Bizkit	Rage; Secret Discovery The Black Stage; Dissection; Satyricon; Dimmu Borgir; Goddess of Desire	Vision of Disorder; Deviate; Discipline; I Against I

Sunday May 18
Mainstage	Skatefest
Tiamat; KoЯn; Marilyn Manson; Helmet; Testament; Cradle of Filth; Karma to Burn; Laberinto	Voodoo Glow Skulls; Backfire! Travoltas; Slyce

==== 1998 ====
Friday May 29
The Gallery	Skatefest
Atrocity; Theatre of Tragedy; Masters of Reality; The Hellacopters; Transport League; Sevendust; Insane Clown Posse; Tura Satana; Deicide; Six Feet Under; Disbelief; T-Nailed	Pro-Pain; Congress; Refused; Hard Resistance; Janez Detd. Driven

Saturday May 30
Mainstage	The Gallery	Skatefest
Rammstein; Deftones; Soulfly; Fates Warning; Agnostic Front; Fu Manchu; Stuck Mojo; HammerFall; Within Temptation; Zebrahead	The Factory; Strapping Young Lad; Junkie XL; Think About Mutation; Misery Loves Co. Black Stage; Emperor; Immortal The Kovenant; Bewitched; Enslaved In Flames; Cold; Oomph! Ultraspank; The Black Symphony; Form	Brotherhood Foundation; H_{2}O; 25 ta Life; Good Riddance; Right Direction; Psycore; Fury of Five; Tech-9

Sunday May 31
Mainstage	The Gallery	Skatefest
Pantera; Death; Life of Agony; Coal Chamber; Kreator; Dimmu Borgir; Incubus (həd) ^{p.e.}	Power Pack; Primal Fear; Stratovarius; Helloween; Saxon; Blind Guardian; Iced Earth; Tom Angelripper Space Jam; Far; Cathedral; Spiritual Beggars; 7Zuma7; Sheavy; Orange Goblin	Misfits; Undeclinable Ambuscade; Hatebreed; Battery; Better Than a Thousand; Maximum Penalty

Cancelled shows : Fear Factory (replaced by Death), Human Waste Project (replaced by Ultraspank) and Limp Bizkit (replaced by Psycore).

==== 1999 ====
Friday May 21
The Gallery	Skatefest
Dark Symphonies; Therion; Anathema; Lacuna Coil Sodom; Static-X; Spineshank; Darkane; One Minute Silence; Angra; Out	Madball; Hard-Ons; Heideroosjes; Violation of Trust; Cold as Life

Saturday May 22
Mainstage	The Gallery	Skatefest
Manowar; Cradle of Filth; Stormtroopers of Death; The Gathering; Grip Inc. Nashville Pussy; Black Label Society; Meshuggah; Loudness; Skinlab	The Factory; Pitchshifter; Atari Teenage Riot; Cubanate The Gore Zone; Hypocrisy; Cryptopsy; Arch Enemy; Nile Trail of Tears; Pulkas; The Haunted; Unjust; CAGE	Ryker's; 59 Times the Pain; Merauder; Murphy's Law; Run Devil Run; All Out War; E.Town Concrete; Troopers

Sunday May 23
Mainstage	The Gallery	Maximum Overdrive
Metallica; Apocalyptica; Fear Factory; Biohazard; Monster Magnet; System of a Down; Mercyful Fate	The Power Pack; Labyrinth; Nevermore; Overkill; Gamma Ray; Nocturnal Rites The Black Stage; Marduk; Dimmu Borgir; Thyrfing; God Dethroned; Ancient Rites In Extremo; Space Age Playboys; Oceans of Sadness	Gluecifer; Unida; Goatsnake; Fatso Jetson; Zeke; Iron Monkey; Nebula; Peter Pan Speedrock

Cancelled bands : Bolt Thrower, Morbid Angel, Speedealer, Skarhead and Blood for Blood. The three latter bands were replaced by Arch Enemy, Goatsnake, Merauder and E.Town Concrete respectively.

==== 2000 ====
Saturday June 3
Main Stage	Tent Stage
Iron Maiden; Korn; Slipknot; Suicidal Tendencies; P.O.D. Testament; Methods of Mayhem; Zeke	Immortal; Mayhem; The Kovenant; Destruction; Spiritual Beggars; Kittie; Sentenced; Engine

Cancelled bands : Entombed (replaced by Destruction)

==== 2001 ====
Festival cancelled due to the threat of foot and mouth disease.

The announced bands were: After Forever, Amen, Backfire!, Behemoth, Brightside, Catastrophic, Cradle of Filth, Destiny's End, Destroÿer 666, Discipline, Disturbed, Dreadlock Pussy, Dropkick Murphys, Dying Fetus, Exhumed, Hed PE, Ignite, In Extremo, Krisiun, Length of Time, Liar, Lost Horizon, Macabre, Merauder, M.O.D., Motörhead, Mudvayne, Napalm Death, Nasum, Nevermore, Opeth, Pain of Salvation, Papa Roach, Savatage, Saxon, Severe Torture, Shelter, Slipknot, Soulfly, Spineshank, Static-X, Symphony X, Terra Firma, Tool, The Union Underground, Vader, Wicked Mystic, Within Temptation.

Tool scheduled a headlining show at 013 in Tilburg on the day they were supposed to play, while Slipknot and few other bands played a "mini-festival" at Maaspoort in Den Bosch on May 25. Soulfly played more club shows in the Netherlands.

==== 2002 ====
Sunday July 14
Main Stage	Tent Stage
Soulfly; Death Angel; Dropkick Murphys; Within Temptation; Biohazard; Pain of Salvation; Deadsoul Tribe	Children of Bodom; Opeth; Finntroll; Strapping Young Lad; Zimmers Hole; Peter Pan Speedrock; Hermano; Autumn

==== 2003 ====
Festival cancelled. No bands announced.

==== 2004 ====
Saturday June 5
Stage 1	Stage 2
Slayer; Nightwish; Life of Agony; Soulfly; Children of Bodom; Ill Nino; Shadows Fall	Dimmu Borgir; Agent Steel; After Forever; Oomph! Deicide; Mastodon

==== 2005 ====
Saturday May 7
Stage 1	Stage 2
Anthrax; Jon Oliva's Pain; Testament; Obituary; Gorefest; Lȧȧz Rockit; Masterplan; Mercenary	Evergrey; Trivium; 3 Inches of Blood; Still Remains

=== Dynamo Metalfest ===
==== 2015 ====
Saturday July 18

Arch Enemy
Death Angel
Nuclear Assault
Biohazard
Alestorm
Orange Goblin
Bodyfarm
Facelifter

==== 2016 ====
Saturday July 16

Anthrax
At the Gates
Metal Church
Obituary
~~Life of Agony~~
Powerwolf
Sacred Reich
Textures
Audrey Horne
Extremities

==== 2017 ====
Saturday July 15

Gojira
Testament
Devin Townsend Project
Exodus
Entombed A.D.
Prong
Toxik
Vuur
White Boy Wasted

==== 2018 ====
Saturday July 14

Ghost
Ministry
Overkill
Annihilator
Leprous
I Am Morbid
VUUR (replacing Sons of Apollo)
Iron Reagan
Elephant

==== 2019 ====
Friday July 19

Airbourne
Avatar
Eluveitie
Grand Magus
Jungle Rot
Bæst

Saturday July 20

Arch Enemy
Steel Panther
Carcass
Metal Church
Soulfly
Phil Anselmo & the Illegals
Armored Saint
Tribulation
Alien Weaponry

==== 2020 ====
Festival cancelled due to the threat of coronavirus. Bands that were supposed to play were Exodus, Obituary, Midnight, Flotsam and Jetsam, Heaven Shall Burn, Sepultura, Jinjer and Beast in Black.

==== 2021 ====
Festival cancelled due to coronavirus. Bands that were supposed to play were Heaven Shall Burn, Testament, Bay Area Interthrashional, Sacred Reich, The Black Dahlia Murder, Firewind, Rings of Saturn, Amon Amarth, Candlemass, Clutch, Jinjer, Municipal Waste, Unleash the Archers and Dress the Dead.

==== 2022 ====
Saturday August 20

Testament

Candlemass

Exodus

Death Angel

Cattle Decapitation

Firewind

Vended

Dress the Dead

TankZilla

Sunday August 21

Kreator

Heaven Shall Burn

Lamb of God

Bay Area Interthrashional

Jinjer

Cannibal Corpse

Angelus Apatrida

Lik

Urne
