= Owen Wright (guitarist) =

American rock musician

- Genres: Grunge, heavy metal
- Occupation: Musician
- Instrument: Guitar
- Years active: 1984–present
- Formerly of: Mistrust, My Sister's Machine

Owen Wright is an American musician known for playing guitar with the Seattle-based metal bands Mistrust and My Sister's Machine.

== Career ==
In 1984, Wright formed the band Mistrust along with singer Kevin Wells (later replaced by Jeff L'Heureux from Culprit), guitarist Michael Winston, bassist Tim Wolfe, and drummer Chris Gohde. They released an album in 1986 called Spin the World, which brought them opening gigs with Alice Cooper, Stryper, and Loudness. The band continued touring for another two years before they disbanded in 1988.

A year later, Wright and Gohde formed the band My Sister's Machine along with singer-guitarist Nick Pollock and bassist Chris Ivanovich. Pollock had previously played guitar with the band Alice N' Chains, a precursor to Alice in Chains that also featured Layne Staley on vocals. My Sister's Machine recorded two albums, Diva and Wallflower, and toured with other notable acts such as Alice in Chains, Pantera, and White Zombie. Wright is credited for co-writing the music to almost every song in the band's catalog. Although both albums were largely well received by critics, My Sister's Machine split up in 1994 after Elektra Entertainment folded the label they were under at that time.

Since the breakup, Wright has played guitar in a band called Old Lady Litterbug whose other members were vocalist Love on Ice Dan Krueger, bassist Nick Rhinehart, and drummer Thomas NaDeau. Rhinehart has toured with Alice in Chains members Jerry Cantrell and Sean Kinney in support of Cantrell's first solo album Boggy Depot. Old Lady Litterbug has recorded a seven-track EP called KMG-365 released in 1998.

In 2009, Wright and Gohde reunited with their Mistrust bandmates at the Feedback Lounge in West Seattle for the CD release of Spin the World. The following year they reunited with My Sister's Machine for the 2010 Layne Staley Tribute and Benefit Concert. In 2011, Wright made a guest appearance on Love's Gentle Maw by Tanks of Zen, playing guitar solos on the tracks "Alibi" and "Gravity".

== Discography ==
Year	Album details	Band
1986	Spin the World: Released: 1986; Label: C.O.M.A. Heart of Steel	Mistrust
1992	Diva: Released: January 24, 1992; Label: Caroline	My Sister's Machine
1993	Wallflower: Released: August 10, 1993; Label: Chamelon	My Sister's Machine
1998	KMG-365 (extended play): Released: 1998; Label: Big Bug Productions	Old Lady Litterbug

Other appearances

Year	Album details	Band	Notes
2011	Love's Gentle Maw: Released: September 30, 2011; Label: Headless Records	Tanks of Zen	Guitar solos on the songs "Alibi" and "Gravity"
