= Mistrust (band) =

American heavy metal band

- From left to right: Chris Gohde, Tim Wolfe, Jeff L'Heureux, Michael Winston, and Owen Wright

Background information
- Origin: Seattle, Washington, U.S.
- Genre: Heavy metal
- Years active: 1984–1988
- Labels: C.O.M.A., Heart of Steel
- Past members: Chris Gohde; Jeff L'Heureux; Michael Winston; Tim Wolfe; Owen Wright

Mistrust was an American heavy metal band formed in Seattle, Washington in 1984. It primarily consisted of vocalist Jeff L'Heureux, guitarists Owen Wright and Michael Winston, bassist Tim Wolfe, and drummer Chris Gohde. They recorded one album in their brief existence called Spin the World, which was originally released through C.O.M.A. Records in 1986 and again through Heart of Steel Records in 2009.

== History ==
=== Background and formation (1981–1984) ===
Before joining Mistrust, vocalist Jeff L'Heureux was involved in the band Culprit, which was first formed in 1981. They recorded one studio album in 1983 called Guilty as Charged. Meanwhile, guitarist Michael Winston and bassist Tim Wolfe played in a band called Rottweiller, appearing alongside various other artists, including Metal Church, on a compilation album in 1984 called Northwest Metalfest; this album also features the band Sato whose bass player was future Alice in Chains member Mike Starr. Winston and Wolfe left Rottweiler shortly afterwards to join guitarist Owen Wright, drummer Chris Gohde, and vocalist Kevin Wells in what was then the first incarnation of Mistrust. When asked why they chose Mistrust as their band name, Gohde replied, "I forget who came up with the name, but I think Owen did. We thought there was a lot of 'mistrust' in the world so kind[a] just went with it. And it sounded cool!" Things began to fall apart with Wells prompting the rest of the band to search for a different vocalist as they continued to hone their craft. They initially went with Howard Dee Gray, who is the older brother of Kelly Gray, and recorded a four-song demo with him before he also parted ways with the group. Eventually, Jeff L'Heureux agreed to help out and sing on their demo but initially declined to join the band as he was still with Culprit at the time.

=== Spin the World (1985–1988) ===
In 1985, Mistrust recorded a song with L'Heureux as a part-time member called "Running for My Life", which later appeared on the compilation album Pacific Metal Project. When Culprit broke up following the departure of guitarist Kjartan Kristofferson (who would also later join Mistrust, albeit briefly) and bassist Scott Earl, L'Heureux became a full-time member of Mistrust. A year later, they released their first full-length album Spin the World, which was released through C.O.M.A. records in 1986. The release of this album brought them opening gigs with Alice Cooper, Stryper, and Loudness. However, the record failed to sell enough and things began to fall apart again culminating with Winston's departure from the group in 1987. Former Culprit guitarist Kjartan Kristofferson took his place for a brief period and the group continued performing shows and writing music but eventually they decided to call it quits in 1988.

=== Post-breakup (1988–present) ===
After the breakup, Owen Wright and Chris Gohde formed the band My Sister's Machine along with singer-guitarist Nick Pollock and bassist Chris Ivanovich; Pollock previously played guitar with singer Layne Staley in an early incarnation of Alice in Chains. They recorded two albums, Diva and Wallflower, before breaking up in 1994. A few years later, Wright formed the band Old Lady Litterbug along with Love on Ice vocalist Dan Kreuger, bassist Nick Rhinehart, and drummer Thomas Nadeau. They put out an EP titled KMG-365 in 1998.

In 2009, Mistrust reunited at the Feedback Lounge in West Seattle to celebrate the first CD release of Spin the World through Heart of Steel Records. This was followed over a decade later in 2022 with an expanded version, featuring three unreleased songs recorded in 1987, released on CD and vinyl respectively in November and December of that year through N.W. Metalworx. Also in November 2022, the band put out the four-song demo they recorded with Howard Dee Gray on vocals for the first time under the moniker You Can't Run Away from Love on Bandcamp before later putting it out on CD in 2023.

== Members ==
- Owen Wright – guitar (1984–1987)
- Tim Wolfe – bass (1984–1987)
- Chris Gohde – drums (1984–1987)
- Michael Winston – guitar (1984–1987)
- Kevin Wells – vocals (1984)
- Howard Dee Gray – vocals (1985)
- Jeff L'Heureux – vocals (1985–1987; died 2023)
- Kjartan Kristoffersen – guitar (1987)

== Discography ==
Studio albums

- Spin the World (1986)

Demos

- You Can't Run Away from Love (2023)

Other appearances

Year	Song	Title	Label
1985	"Running for Life"	Pacific Metal Project	Restless Records
