= Sabina Classen =

German singer

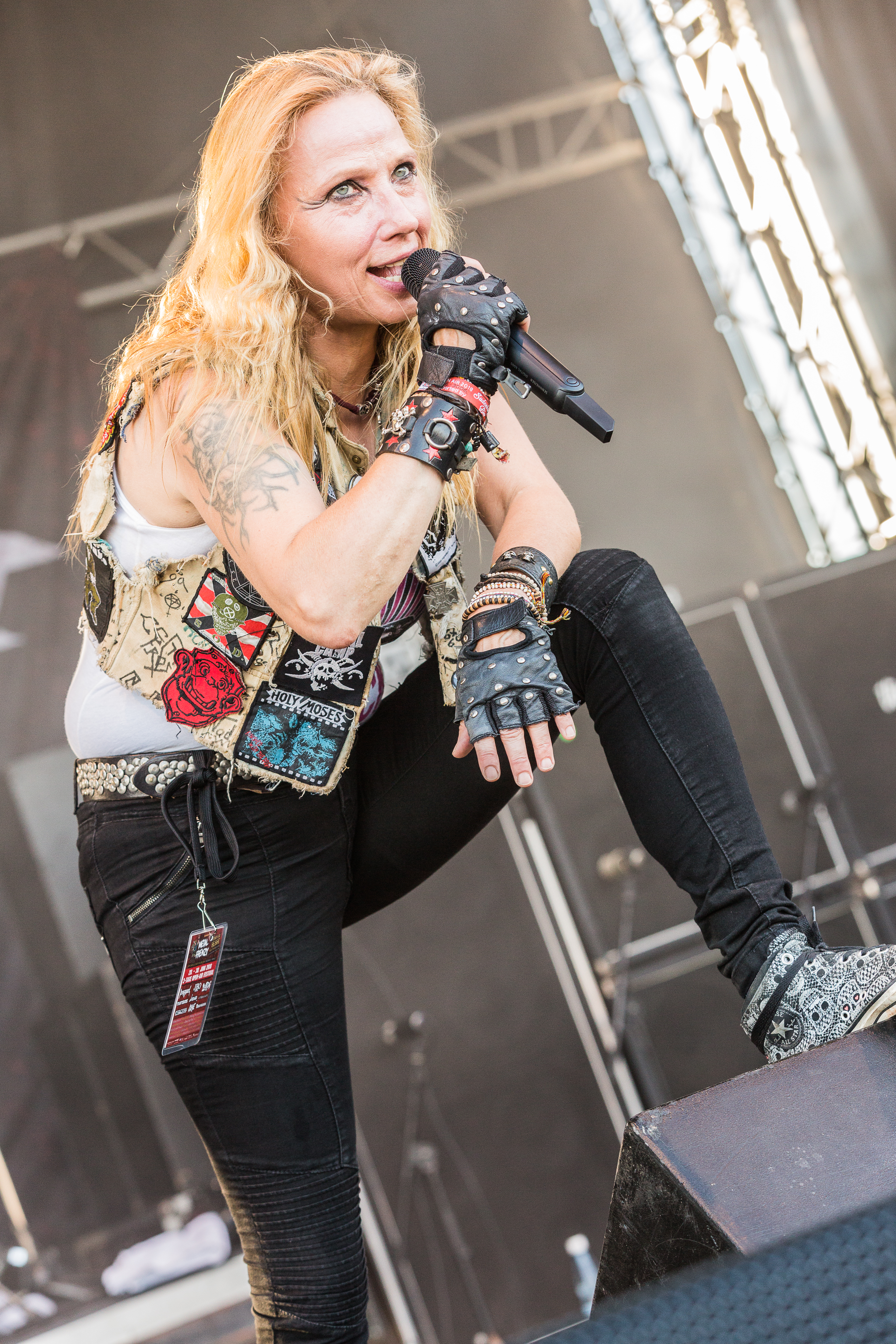
- Classen with Holy Moses at Metal Frenzy 2018

Background information
- Born: Sabina Hirtz; 27 December 1963 (age 61); Aachen, West Germany
- Genres: Thrash metal
- Occupations: Singer, songwriter
- Years active: 1981–present
- Formerly of: Holy Moses, Temple of the Absurd
- Spouse: Andy Claasen (div.)
- Website: holymoses.net

Sabina Classen (née Hirtz; born 27 December 1963) is a German thrash metal singer, best known as lead vocalist of Holy Moses and Temple of the Absurd.

== Career ==
In 1981, Classen joined Holy Moses, where her then-husband Andy Classen was playing guitar. In 1988, she presented the heavy metal television program Mosh. After the break-up of Holy Moses in 1994, she formed the band Temple of the Absurd. The band released two albums and was disbanded in 2000. The same year, Holy Moses was reformed and remained functional until 2023.

== Discography ==
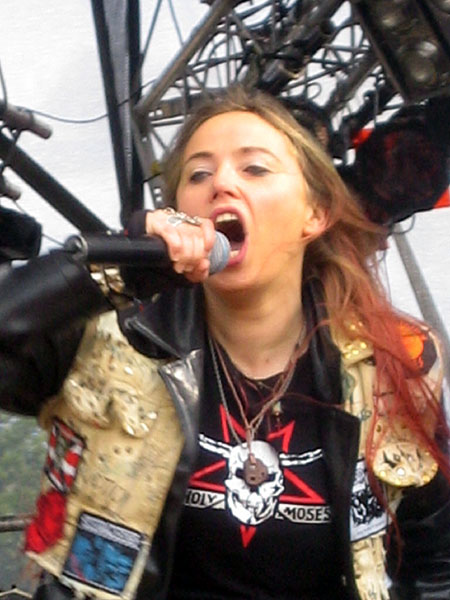
Classen in 2005

=== With Holy Moses ===
- Queen of Siam (1986)
- Finished with the Dogs (1987)
- The New Machine of Lichtenstein (1989)
- World Chaos (1990)
- Terminal Terror (1991)
- Reborn Dogs (1992)
- No Matter What's the Cause (1994)
- Master of Disaster (2001)
- Disorder of the Order (2002)
- Strength Power Will Passion (2005)
- Agony of Death (2008)
- Redefined Mayhem (2014)
- Invisible Queen (2023)

=== With Temple of the Absurd ===
- Absurd (1995)
- Mother, Creator, God (1999)
