= Diva (My Sister's Machine album) =

Studio album by My Sister's Machine
- Released: January 24, 1992
- Recorded: 1992
- Studio: Robert Lang (Shoreline, Washington)
- Genres: Grunge, alternative metal, alternative rock
- Length: 38:47
- Label: Caroline
- Producers: My Sister's Machine, Ronnie S. Champagne

My Sister's Machine chronology
Diva (1992)	Wallflower (1993)

Music videos
- I'm Sorry on YouTube
- I Hate You on YouTube

Diva is the debut studio album by American grunge band My Sister's Machine.

== Background and recording ==
Before the formation of My Sister's Machine, singer and lyricist Nick Pollock had played guitar in an early incarnation of Alice in Chains with vocalist Layne Staley; they called themselves Alice N' Chains. When that band broke up on friendly terms in 1987, Pollock played for a year with older musicians in a funk band. In 1989, he formed MSM along with guitarist Owen Wright, bassist Chris Ivanovich, and drummer Chris Gohde; Wright and Gohde previously played in a band called Mistrust, which also included former Culprit singer Jeff L'Heureux.

Since none of the other band members had ever been a singer before, Pollock got the job by default being the band's primary lyricist. In order to have more artistic control over their debut album, the band initially decided to sign a deal with a small independent record company called Caroline Records. "The band's standpoint is that it's not time," Pollock said. "We consciously decided to go with an independent, so we could (have the freedom to) say, 'This is the way I want the cover to look,' and 'I want to be part of producing the album, even though I am not a record producer, because it's a learning experience for me.' We have a really good relationship with the label. When the time comes when we're ready to move on, they're more than willing to sell the contract to a major label with the resources to put on a bigger marketing push." The album was recorded at Robert Lang Studios in Shoreline, Washington.

== Music and lyrics ==
Pollock is credited for writing or co-writing all music and lyrics off Diva. Mike Boehm of the Los Angeles Times wrote that while there are "some clear Alice in Chains echoes in My Sister's Machine...one can also detect similarities to sources beyond one scene--you can hear some of the Cult's catchy hard-riffing, and some of Axl Rose's contorted, word-bending phrasing." Boehm also observed that MSM differed most from their Seattle contemporaries in lyrical content, writing, "Typically, the Seattle bands are a markedly angry, doom-laden bunch, sticking to the dark side and giving shape to feelings that come with being part of a generation that faces the likelihood of being materially worse off than its parents. My Sister's Machine is far more even-handed." From there, Boehm contrasts the aggression of "I Hate You" with the stricken apology of "I'm Sorry". He also highlights another track "Monster Box" where he writes, "MSM takes a radical departure from standard heavy-metal ideology by condemning libertinism and sex without emotional bonds." Pollock said of the song, "'Monster Box' isn't about AIDS, but about morality. It's just me going off about my beliefs, and how life should be."

== Release and reception ==
Professional ratings
Review scores
Source	Rating
AllMusic	4.5/5 stars

The resulting album, Diva, was released January 24, 1992. Diva included the singles "I'm Sorry" and "I Hate You", both of which had accompanying music videos. The video for "I'm Sorry" was directed by Paul Rachman, who also directed music videos for Alice in Chains' "Man in the Box" and "Sea of Sorrow". Steve Kurutz of AllMusic gave the album four and a half stars, calling it "a surprisingly strong record musically...Though the lyrics are, for the most part, ridiculously poor, they are delivered with enough attitude that the listener will hardly notice unless he reads the album booklet." Jim Washburn, also of Los Angeles Times, described the band as "more melodic and more propulsive than its Seattle soul mates Alice in Chains" on the album but was far less enthused when he saw them in concert, during which they were said to be filming the video for "I Hate You". Troy J. Augusto of Variety described the album as "a noisy, angry and yet thoughtful collection that points to good fortune for the band."

== Track listing ==
All lyrics written by Nick Pollock, except where noted. All music written by Owen Wright and Nick Pollock, except where noted.

No.	Title	Lyrics	Music	Length
1.	"Hands and Feet"			3:58
2.	"Pain"			2:21
3.	"I Hate You"			3:39
4.	"Wasting Time"	Pollock/Wright	Wright/Pollock/Ivanovich	5:08
5.	"Love at High Speed"			4:21
6.	"I'm Sorry"			3:28
7.	"Walk All over You"			3:48
8.	"Sunday"			3:59
9.	"Monster Box"		Wright/Pollock/Ivanovich/Gohde	2:55
10.	"Diva"		Pollock	5:05
Total length:				38:47

== Personnel ==
Adapted from AllMusic.

My Sister's Machine

- Chris Gohde – drums
- Chris Ivanovich – bass
- Nick Pollock – vocals, vox organ
- Owen Wright – guitar

Additional personnel

- Saucy Pierre – guitar, keyboards, backing vocals

Management

- J. Eugene Salomon Jr. – legal representation

Production

- Ronnie S. Champagne – producer
- My Sister's Machine – producer, arranger
- Steve Culp – assistant producer
- Mr. Colson – mixer
- Howie Weinberg – mastering
- Chris Ivanovich – art direction, artwork, design
- Nick Pollock – art direction, artwork, design
- Saulius Pempe – art direction, artwork, design, photography
- Randy Hall – photography
