= Nailbomb =

Multinational heavy metal band

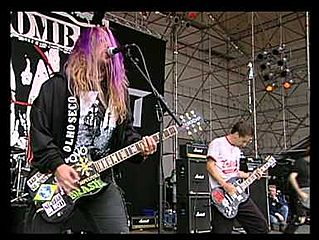
- Max Cavalera (left) and Alex Newport (right) at the Dynamo Open Air in June 1995

Background information
- Genres: Industrial metal; thrash metal
- Years active: 1993–1995; 2024–present
- Label: Roadrunner
- Spinoff of: Sepultura; Fudge Tunnel
- Members: Max Cavalera; Igor Amadeus Cavalera
- Past members: Alex Newport

Nailbomb is an American heavy metal band formed in 1993 as a side project by Brazilian musician Max Cavalera (then the frontman of Sepultura) and British musician Alex Newport of Fudge Tunnel. They play a combination of primarily industrial metal and thrash metal, with elements of crust punk and sludge metal. The band recorded one studio album, Point Blank, and played a warmup live performance and their only official gig for 29 years at the 1995 Dynamo Open Air Festival two days later, after which the band disbanded. The band reunited for the first time in 29 years in Tempe, Arizona in November 2024.

== History ==
The roots of Nailbomb can be traced back to 1994, when Sepultura were touring behind the previous year’s Chaos A.D. album, with support from Fudge Tunnel. While on tour, Gloria Cavalera’s stepdaughter, Christina, started dating Newport. After the tour, the couple moved to Phoenix near the Cavaleras. Max liked Newport, so the two hung out and soon started jamming. They showed each other how their respective bands played riffs because they loved the sound of their albums, Newport asking how to play the "really fast" thrash riffs on Sepultura's Arise and Max asking how to get the "ultra-heavy" guitar tones on Fudge Tunnel's Hate Songs in E Minor. It was the idea of Cavalera's wife, Gloria, for the two to start a band, to which they were reluctant, saying they were "just messing around", but Gloria insisted.

Nailbomb hosted other musicians to play guest spots, including D.H. Peligro (Dead Kennedys), Max Cavalera's brother Igor Cavalera (Sepultura co-founder), and guitarist Dino Cazares (co-founder and guitarist of Fear Factory). Nailbomb's second album, Proud to Commit Commercial Suicide, was a live recording capturing the band's appearance at the 1995 Dynamo Open Air Festival in Eindhoven, the Netherlands.

The project was largely defunct for over two decades, with no intention of the band ever reuniting or releasing any new material, until Cavalera announced in April 2017 he would play the entire Point Blank album on tour with his band Soulfly. Newport was not involved in the performances, citing his busy schedule as the reason. Instead, Cavalera drafted his son Igor Cavalera Jr., who had previously toured as a bassist and backing vocalist for Soulfly, to perform Newport's vocal and keyboard/sampler parts.

On August 14, 2024, Max Cavalera announced that Nailbomb would reunite for its first show in 29 years as part of the "Dynasty Show", which took place at the Marquee Theatre in Tempe, Arizona on November 9. In addition to Cavalera, the lineup for this show was his son Igor and Travis Stone both on guitar, bassist Johny Chow, sampler Alex Cha and drummer Adam Jarvis. Nailbomb performed at both Wacken Open Air in Germany and Bloodstock Open Air in England in August 2025.

== Band members ==
=== Current ===
- Max Cavalera – vocals, rhythm guitar, bass, samples (1993–1995, 2024–present)
- Igor Amadeus Cavalera – vocals, rhythm guitar (2024–present)

=== Former ===
- Alex Newport – vocals, lead guitar, bass, samples (1993–1995)

=== Session ===
- Igor Cavalera – drums
- Andreas Kisser – lead guitar
- Dino Cazares – rhythm guitar

=== Touring members ===
- Travis Stone (Pig Destroyer, Desolus)– lead guitar (2024–present)
- Alex Cha (Pig Destroyer) – samples (2024–present)
- Adam Jarvis (Pig Destroyer, Misery Index, Scour) - drums (2024–present)
- Jackie Cruz (Go Ahead and Die, Jade Helm) – bass (2025–present)

=== Former touring members ===
- Igor Cavalera (Sepultura) – drums (1995)
- D.H. Peligro (Dead Kennedys) – drums (1995)
- Evan Seinfeld (Biohazard) – bass (1995)
- Rhys Fulber (Fear Factory) – keyboards (1995)
- Barry C. Schneider (Tribe After Tribe) – drums (1995)
- Richie Cavalera (Incite) – rhythm guitar (1995)
- Michael "Scoot" Gladok (Doom) – bass (1995)
- Dave Edwardson (Neurosis) - bass, backing vocals (1995)
- Christian Olde Wolbers (Fear Factory) – bass (1995)
- Johny Chow (Stone Sour) – bass (2024)
- Chris Moore (Repulsion, Vosh) – drums (2025)
- Demir Soyer (Goetia, Execution Hour) – guitar (2025)

== Discography ==
Studio albums

Title	Album details	Peak chart positions		
Title	Album details	UK	NLD	GER
Point Blank	Released: March 8, 1994; Label: Roadrunner Records; Formats: CD, CS, digital download	62	70	63

Live albums

Title	Album details
Proud to Commit Commercial Suicide	Released: October 24, 1995; Label: Roadrunner Records; Formats: CD, digital download

Video albums

Title	Album details	Sales
Live at Dynamo	Released: November 8, 2005; Label: Roadrunner Records; Formats: DVD	US: 200+
