= Queen of Siam =

Queen of Siam may refer to:

- Queen of Siam (Lydia Lunch album), 1980
- Queen of Siam (Holy Moses album), 1986

== See also ==
- Queen consort of Siam
