= Point Blank (Nailbomb album) =

Studio album by Nailbomb
- Released: March 8, 1994
- Studios: Chaton Studios, Scottsdale; Theresa's Catholic Bedroom, Phoenix
- Genres: Industrial metal; thrash metal; groove metal
- Length: 62:38
- Label: Roadrunner
- Producers: Alex Newport; Max Cavalera

Nailbomb chronology
Point Blank (1994)	Proud to Commit Commercial Suicide (1995)

Professional ratings
Review scores
Source	Rating
AllMusic	3/5 stars
Collector's Guide to Heavy Metal	8/10
Kerrang!	4/5 stars
Rock Hard	8.5/10
Vox	5/10

Point Blank is the only studio album by heavy metal band Nailbomb, released on March 8, 1994, by Roadrunner Records. Nailbomb was a side project formed by Max Cavalera (Sepultura) and Alex Newport (Fudge Tunnel) in 1993.

The album cover is a photo of female Vietnamese civilian with a U.S. soldier's gun to her head, which Max Cavalera and Alex Newport retrieved from the Alternative Associated Press. Cavalera stated that they wanted to create a similar cover to Rage Against the Machine's self-titled album, an image of the self immolation of Thích Quảng Đức. According to Cavalera, the woman in the cover lived after the photo was taken.

A portion of the opening track, "Wasting Away", appears in the 1995 film To Die For. Point Blank was played live in its entirety for the first time in 2017 by Cavalera and his band Soulfly, more than 20 years after the release of the album and Nailbomb's breakup. Newport's parts were played by Cavalera's son Igor Amadeus Cavalera.

== Track listing ==
All tracks written by Max Cavalera and Alex Newport unless noted.

No.	Title	Length
1.	"Wasting Away"	3:06
2.	"Vai Toma no Cu" (Portuguese: "Take it in the ass". Alternatively, the expression can also mean "Go fuck yourself", although not a literal translation.)	4:47
3.	"24 Hour Bullshit"	3:54
4.	"Guerrillas"	4:26
5.	"Blind and Lost"	1:54
6.	"Sum of Your Achievements"	2:42
7.	"Cockroaches"	5:10
8.	"For Fuck's Sake"	5:44
9.	"World of Shit"	4:13
10.	"Exploitation" (Doom cover)	2:28
11.	"Religious Cancer"	5:09
12.	"Shit Piñata"	1:09
13.	"Sick Life" (The song "Sick Life" ends at 6:31. After 10 minutes of silence, at 16:31, an untitled improvised hidden track begins.)	17:51
Total length:		62:38

=== Bonus track version ===
A remastered version was released on February 24, 2004, with liner notes and extra tracks:

No.	Title	Length
14.	"While You Sleep, I Destroy Your World"	5:06
15.	"Zero Tolerance"	6:34
16.	"Wasting Away" (live)	3:03
17.	"Guerillas" (live)	3:27
18.	"Cockroaches" (live)	4:06
19.	"Police Truck" (live; East Bay Ray, Jello Biafra)	3:08
Total length:		76:19

== Samples ==
"Guerrillas" contains a sample of "Procreation (Of the Wicked)" by Celtic Frost and a sample from the movie Salvador. "Cockroaches" contains a sample from the movie Henry: Portrait of a Serial Killer. "For Fuck's Sake" contains samples of GG Allin's last TV appearance on The Jane Whitney Show before his death in June 1993.

== Personnel ==
Nailbomb

- Max Cavalera - vocals, rhythm guitar, bass, sampling (vocals credited as "insults")
- Alex Newport - vocals, lead guitar, bass, sampling (vocals credited as "mouthful of hate")

Additional personnel

- Andreas Kisser - lead guitar on tracks 2, 9 & 11
- Igor Cavalera - drums on tracks 1, 5, 7, 10, 12 & 13
- Dino Cazares - rhythm guitar on track 3

Production

- Nailbomb - production
- Otto Agnello - recording
- Alex Newport - mixing

== Chart positions ==
Chart (1994)	Peak position
Dutch Albums (Album Top 100)	70
German Albums (Offizielle Top 100)	63
UK Albums (OCC)	62
