= Living Death (band) =

German speed/thrash metal band

Background information
- Origin: Velbert, Germany
- Genres: Speed metal; thrash metal
- Years active: 1981–1992; 2008–2010; 2026–present
- Label: Earthshaker
- Past members: Reiner Kelch; Dieter Kelch; Frank Fricke; Frank Schubring; Thorsten "Toto" Bergmann; Harald Lutze; Andreas Overhoff; Atomic Steif; Gerald Thelen; Frank Ullrich

Living Death is a German speed metal/thrash metal band from Velbert, noted as a pioneering thrash metal band. The band's career spanned from the early 1980s until the early 1990s, and has acquired cult status.

== History ==
Reiner and Dieter Kelch and Frank Fricke formed Living Death as a heavy metal in 1981 in Velbert, North Rhine-Westphalia. That year, drummer Frank Schubring and vocalist Thorsten "Toto" Bergmann joined. A year later, they recorded their self-titled demo and signed with Earthshaker in 1983. Later that year, Schubring left the band and was replaced with Harald Lutze.

In 1984, Living Death released their debut album, Vengeance of Hell, which, despite poor production quality, sold well in independent charts. Living Death toured supporting Warlock, after which they fired drummer Harald Lutze and replaced him with Andreas Overhoff. In January 1985, they released the EP Watch-Out! with three remixed songs from the first LP and the titled track. In August, Metal Revolution was released. Due to its cult status, Shark Records reissued the album in 2002. A year later, the band signed with Aaarrg Records and recorded the EP Back to the Weapons. Shortly before its release, they found drummer Atomic Steif. In 1987, the album Protected from Reality was released, followed by May 1988's Live EP, featuring four songs off their second album.

After releasing their fourth studio album, Worlds Neuroses, in 1989, band members Toto, Fred, and Atomic Steif left the band and recorded one EP as Sacred Chao, taking the name from a song on Worlds Neuroses. The remaining Living Death members recruited vocalist Gerald Thelen and drummer Frank Ullrich. This line-up split up in 1992, having released Killing in Action a year prior.

After briefly reuniting for a series of concerts in 2009 and 2010, Living Death announced their second reunion in 2026.

== Previous members ==
=== Last-known lineup ===
- Thorsten "Toto" Bergmann (singer)
- Andreas Oberhoff (drummer)
- Reiner Kelch (guitar)
- Dieter Kelch (bass)

Vocals

- Thorsten "Toto" Bergmann (1981–1989) (Sacred Chao, X-Mas Project)
- Gerald Thelen (1989–1991)

Guitars:

- Frank "Fred" Fricke (1980–1989) (Mekong Delta, X-Mas Project, Sacred Chao, ex-U.D.O.)

Drums

- Frank Schubring (1981–1983)
- Eric (session drums on Vengeance of Hell)
- Harald Lutze (1984)
- Andreas Oberhoff (1984–1986, died 2021)
- Atomic Steif (1986–1989, died 2025) (Stahlträger, Assassin, Sodom, Holy Moses, Violent Force, Sacred Chao)

== Discography ==
=== Studio albums ===
- Vengeance of Hell (1984)
- Metal Revolution (1985)
- Protected from Reality (1987)
- Worlds Neuroses (1989)
- Killing in Action (1991)

=== EPs ===
- Watch Out! (1985)
- Back to the Weapons (1986)
- Live (1988)

=== Compilation albums ===
- Living Death (1994)

=== Singles ===
- Eisbein (mit Sauerkraut) (1987)

=== Demos ===
- Demo 83 (1983)
- Pre-Production Demo (1984)
