= The Complicated Futility of Ignorance =

Studio album by Fudge Tunnel
- Released: September 1994
- Genre: Sludge metal; alternative metal; groove metal
- Length: 52:01
- Label: Earache
- Producer: Alex Newport

Fudge Tunnel chronology
Creep Diets (1993)	The Complicated Futility of Ignorance (1994)

The Complicated Futility of Ignorance is the third and final studio album by English rock band Fudge Tunnel, released in September 1994 by Earache Records. The album is notable for being the band's heaviest.

== Overview ==
The Complicated Futility of Ignorance is noted for being the heaviest and most extreme album of the band. While being a mostly sludge album, it is also leaning towards groove metal and in particular, the song "Six Eight" is played in a doom metal style.

== Reception ==
Professional ratings
Review scores
Source	Rating
AllMusic	4/5 stars
Collector's Guide to Heavy Metal	7/10
The Encyclopedia of Popular Music	3/5 stars
The Great Metal Discography	7/10
Kerrang!	4/5 stars
Rock Hard	7.5/10
Select	2/5 stars

AllMusic's Vincent Jeffries gave the album four stars out of five, and noted the release as being "the best of this group's many fine offerings". Trouser Press wrote that "as a refined dose of pure musical aggression that grabs, holds and savages ... it’s the band’s most effective".

The album won a 1995 NAIRD Indie Award, in the Hard Music category.

== Track listing ==
All lyrics are written by Fudge Tunnel; all music is composed by Fudge Tunnel.

No.	Title	Length
1.	"Random Acts Of Cruelty"	4:41
2.	"The Joy Of Irony"	5:33
3.	"Backed Down"	4:06
4.	"Cover Up"	4:51
5.	"Six Eight"	7:12
6.	"Long Day"	3:21
7.	"Excuse"	4:35
8.	"Find Your Fortune"	5:00
9.	"Suffering Makes Great Stories"	3:31
10.	"Circle Of Friends, Circle Of Trends"	4:33
11.	"Rudge with A G"	4:38
12.	"Pope Calvin III"	10:32
Total length:		52:01

- Track 12 is unlisted (but mentioned in the booklet) and includes five minutes of silence before the song starts.

== Personnel ==
=== Fudge Tunnel ===
- Alex Newport – vocals, guitars
- David Ryley – bass guitar
- Adrian Parkin – drums, percussion

=== Additional personnel ===
- Dave Buchanan – engineering
- John Cornfield – engineering
