= Proud to Commit Commercial Suicide =

Live album by Nailbomb
- Released: October 24, 1995
- Recorded: June 1995 (tracks 12–13); July 3, 1995 (tracks 1–11)
- Venue: Dynamo Open Air, Eindhoven (tracks 1–11)
- Studio: Chaton Studios, Scottsdale (tracks 12–13)
- Genre: Industrial metal; thrash metal; groove metal
- Length: 52:41
- Label: Roadrunner
- Producer: Alex Newport, Max Cavalera

Nailbomb chronology
Point Blank (1994)	Proud to Commit Commercial Suicide (1995)

Professional ratings
Review scores
Source	Rating
AllMusic	3/5 stars
Bannoy.com	5/5 stars
Collector's Guide to Heavy Metal	7/10
Kerrang!	4/5 stars
Q	2/5 stars

Proud to Commit Commercial Suicide is a live album by industrial metal band Nailbomb which captures the band's live appearance at the 1995 Dynamo Open Air Festival. The album cover is a picture of the aftermath of the infamous Jonestown suicides. The album's title is a reference to the fact that the band promised they would release only one album.

== Track listing ==
All tracks written by Max Cavalera and Alex Newport, except where noted.

No.	Title	Length
1.	"Wasting Away"	3:56
2.	"Guerrillas"	3:27
3.	"Cockroaches"	4:07
4.	"Vai Toma No Cú"	4:10
5.	"Sum Of Your Achievements"	2:52
6.	"Religious Cancer"	4:34
7.	"Police Truck (Dead Kennedys cover)"	3:11
8.	"Exploitation (Doom cover)"	2:09
9.	"World Of Shit"	3:26
10.	"Blind And Lost"	2:09
11.	"Sick Life"	6:53
12.	"While You Sleep, I Destroy Your World"	5:09
13.	"Zero Tolerance"	6:32
Total length:		52:41

- Tracks 12–13 are studio recorded tracks.

== Personnel ==
=== Nailbomb ===
- Max Cavalera - vocals, guitars
- Alex Newport - vocals, guitars

=== Additional musicians ===
- Rhys Fulber - keyboards, sampler
- Richie Bujinowski - additional guitars
- Dave Edwardson - bass (tracks 1–7, 9–11)
- Scoot Doom - bass, vocals (track 8)
- Evan Seinfeld - bass (track 11)
- Igor Cavalera - drums (tracks 1–3, 10, 11)
- Barry Schneider - drums (tracks 4–6)
- D.H. Peligro - drums, backing vocals (tracks 7–9)

=== Production ===
- Alex Newport - production, mixing
- Max Cavalera - production
- Steve Remote - recording, engineering
- Otto "Rusty" D'Agnolo - mixing
