= Creep Diets =

Studio album by Fudge Tunnel
- Released: 26 April 1993
- Genre: Alternative metal; sludge metal
- Length: 45:49
- Label: Earache; Columbia (US)
- Producer: Alex Newport

Fudge Tunnel chronology
Hate Songs in E Minor (1991)	Creep Diets (1993)	The Complicated Futility of Ignorance (1994)

Singles from Creep Diets
- 1. "Grey" Released: 1993; 2. "10%" Released: 1993

Creep Diets is the second studio album by English rock band Fudge Tunnel, released on 26 April 1993 by Earache Records. It was released by Columbia Records in the United States as part of Earache's deal with Columbia, where it sold less than 15,000 copies.

== Reception ==
Professional ratings
Review scores
Source	Rating
AllMusic	2.5/5 stars
Collector's Guide to Heavy Metal	6/10
The Encyclopedia of Popular Music	3/5 stars
The Great Metal Discography	6/10
Kerrang!	4/5 stars
Rock Hard	8.5/10

The album was mostly well received by critics. Metalreviews.com wrote that it "had more in common with the burgeoning Seattle grunge scene than with the doom metal underground." Ned Raggett of AllMusic criticized the similarity between most of the album's tracks, writing that "while things do sound great throughout, songwise there's not much variety -- hasn't hurt a lot of bands, perhaps, but in the end most listeners would want some sort of break." Thomas Kupfer of Rock Hard praised the albums high energy guitar riffs and controlled vocals, positively comparing its sound to the band Helmet.

== Track listing ==
All lyrics are written by Fudge Tunnel; all music is composed by Fudge Tunnel.

No.	Title	Length
1.	"Grey"	5:29
2.	"Tipper Gore"	3:06
3.	"Ten Percent"	3:52
4.	"Face Down"	5:53
5.	"Grit"	3:25
6.	"Don't Have Time for You"	2:58
7.	"Good Kicking"	4:52
8.	"Hot Salad"	1:10
9.	"Creep Diets"	7:05
10.	"Stuck"	4:38
11.	"Always"	3:19
Total length:		45:49

== Personnel ==
=== Fudge Tunnel ===
- Alex Newport – vocals, guitars
- David Ryley – bass guitar
- Adrian Parkin – drums, percussion

=== Additional personnel ===
- Danny Shackleton – engineering
- Pete Stewart – engineering
- Charles Webster – mixing
