= Atomic Steif =

German drummer (1968–2026)

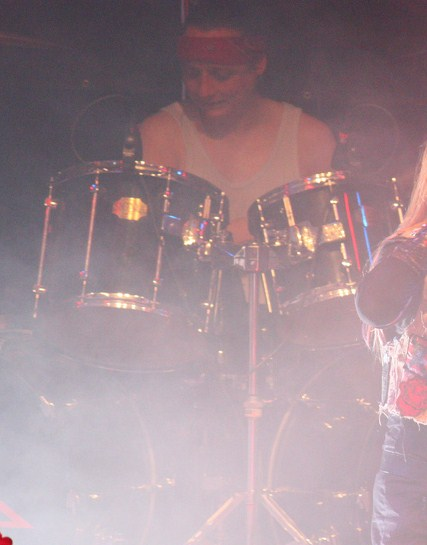
Richter with Holy Moses in 2009

Guido Richter (22 February 1968 – 31 August 2025), better known as Atomic Steif was a German thrash metal drummer.

== Life and Career ==
Richter was born 22 February 1968. Between 1986–1989, he was a member of Living Death. He was a member of Holy Moses for two periods between 1990–1992, and again from 2007–2011.

He was a member of SODOM from 1993–1995.

He died 31 August 2025, aged 57.
