= Guilty as Charged (Culprit album) =

Guilty as Charged!

Studio album by Culprit
- Released: 1983
- Recorded: March 1983
- Studio: Prairie Sun Recording Studios, Cotati, California
- Genre: Heavy metal
- Length: 42:53
- Label: Shrapnel
- Producer: Mike Varney

Culprit chronology
Guilty as Charged! (1983)	Innocent ‘Til Proven Guilty (2005)

Guilty as Charged! is the only studio album released by the American heavy metal band Culprit through Shrapnel Records in 1983.

== Critical reception ==
Professional ratings
Review scores
Source	Rating
AllMusic	4.5/5 stars
Collector's Guide to Heavy Metal	6/10

Eduardo Rivadavia of AllMusic gave the album a glowing review, writing "one has to wonder if the then still Dungeons & Dragons-toting Queensrÿche didn't take note of Culprit's more lucid approach further down the road, since Guilty as Charged feels in many ways like a rough draft of Operation: Mindcrime. All conjecture aside, and even more unusual as compared to their average labelmates' guitar-first philosophy, Culprit songs like 'Steel to Blood,' 'Ambush,' and 'Same to You' boasted extremely memorable, singalong choruses to go with their disciplined instrumental foundations. As it stands, Guilty as Charged remains a lost gem of American metal from the 1980s, and well worth seeking out for fans of other bands from the period." Canadian journalist Martin Popoff was less enthusiastic and found the execution "too loose, raw and undisciplined to impress", conceding that the band "showed promise and caused a lot of hype never to be fulfilled".

In 2005, Guilty as Charged! was ranked number 476 in Rock Hard magazine's book The 500 Greatest Rock & Metal Albums of All Time.

== Track listing ==
All tracks are written by Culprit, except "Stone Cold Crazy" by Queen.

Side one
No.	Title	Length
1.	"Guilty as Charged"	5:45
2.	"Ice in the Back"	5:09
3.	"Steel to Blood"	4:28
4.	"I Am"	3:45
5.	"Ambush"	3:54

Side two
No.	Title	Length
6.	"Tears of Repentance"	5:10
7.	"Same to You"	4:57
8.	"Fight Back"	4:05
9.	"Players"	5:38

2000 Hellion Records reissue bonus tracks
No.	Title	Length
10.	"Guilty as Charged" (Live at Subzero, Seattle 1/2/98)	6:28
11.	"Stone Cold Crazy" (Live at Subzero, Seattle 1/2/98)	2:31
12.	"Fight Back" (Live at Subzero, Seattle 1/2/98)	4:37

== Personnel ==
Culprit

- Jeff L'Heureux – vocals
- John DeVol – guitar
- Kjartan Kristoffersen – guitar
- Scott Earl – bass
- Bud Burrill – drums, lead vocals on track 11

Production

- Mike Varney – producer
- Allen Sudduth – engineer
- Paul Stubblebine – mastering at The Automatt, San Francisco, California
- Candy Folwer – artwork
- Rex Rystedt – photography
