= Agony of Death =

Studio album by Holy Moses
- Released: September 26, 2008
- Recorded: Blue Castle Studio, Germany
- Genre: Thrash metal
- Length: 69:30
- Label: SPV/Steamhammer
- Producer: Michael Hankel, Sabina Classen

Holy Moses chronology
| Strength Power Will Passion (2005) | Agony of Death (2008) |

Professional ratings
Review scores
| Source | Rating |
|---|---|
| About.com | 4/5 stars |
| AllMusic | 3.5/5 stars |
| Terrorizer | (6.5/10) |

Agony of Death is the tenth studio album by German thrash metal band Holy Moses. The album was released in three different dates of 2008, on 26 September in Germany, 29 September in Europe and 7 October in the United States through SPV/Steamhammer.

== Track listing ==
All lyrics are written by Sabina Classen

| No. | Title | Music | Length |
|---|---|---|---|
| 1. | "Imagination" | Jaath, Hankel | 6:07 |
| 2. | "Alienation" | Jaath, Hankel | 5:43 |
| 3. | "World in Darkness" | Jaath, Hankel | 4:34 |
| 4. | "Bloodbound of the Damned" | Jaath | 4:17 |
| 5. | "Pseudohalluzination" | Jaath | 8:17 |
| 6. | "Angels in War" | Jaath, Hankel | 5:36 |
| 7. | "Schizophrenia" | Hankel, Steiff, Classen | 4:52 |
| 8. | "Dissociative Disorder" | Jaath | 5:59 |
| 9. | "The Cave (Paramnesia)" | Jaath | 5:43 |
| 10. | "Delusional Denial" | Hankel, Steiff, Classen | 3:34 |
| 11. | "The Retreat" | Jaath | 6:27 |
| 12. | "Through Shattered Minds/Agony of Death (Outro)" | Jaath (Through Shattered Minds), Hankel and Ferdy Doernberg (Agony of Death – Outro) | 8:16 |

== Personnel ==
Band members

- Sabina Classen – vocals, executive producer
- Michael Hankel – guitar, producer, mastering, mixing
- Oliver Jaath – guitar, backing vocals
- Thomas Neitsch – bass
- Atomic Steiff – drums

Additional musicians

- Ferdy Doernberg – keyboards, samples, slide guitar on "Through Shattered Minds"
- Janos Murri – guitar solo on "Imagination" and "Alienation"
- Ralph Santolla – guitar solo on "World in Darkness" and "Dissociative Disorder"
- Trevor Peres – guitar solo on "Angels in War"
- Karlos Medina – bass on "Imagination"
- Henning Basse – backing vocals on "Schizophrenia"
- The Wolf – backing vocals on "Imagination"
- Schmier – backing vocals on "The Cave"
