= Psycore =

Swedish heavy metal group

- Origin: Gothenburg, Sweden
- Genres: Nu metal
- Years active: 1996-?
- Past members: Markus Jaan; Carlos Sepulveda; Hansi Baumgartner; Hans Wilholm

Psycore was a Swedish heavy metal group formed in Gothenburg in 1996. The band consisted of vocalist Markus Jaan, guitarist Carlos Sepulveda, bass guitarist Hansi Baumgartner and drummer Hans Wilholm. Psycore disbanded after the second album I'm Not One of Us, but the specific time of disbandment is unknown.

== After break-up ==
- After the break-up, band members – Markus Jaan and Carlos Sepulveda founded a heavy metal group called Sweden's Finest. Even this band disbanded after releasing two albums.
- Sepulveda and Jaan then created the alternative electronica group Mikrotone, featuring Freddie Wadling. Again, it was quıte a short lived project with only one release entitled Spraylove.
- Sepulveda also founded the studio Belly of the Whale in order to record and produce these projects.
- Sepulveda has also started a new project in 2009 called Magellan Radio.

In 2014, Sepulveda became a member and producer of the band Leather Nun.

== Discography ==
Albums

- 1998: Your Problem
- 1999: I’m Not One of Us

EPs

- 1997: I Go Solo (7")
- 1997: Future is Fact

Singles

- 1998: "Medication"
- 1998: "I Go Solo"
- 1998: "Fullblood Freak"
- 1999: "The Zoo"

Remixes

- 1998: Dedicated Enemy (The Dot Remixes)
