= Fudge Tunnel =

British alternative metal band

- L-R: David Ryley, Alex Newport, and Adrian Parkin

Background information
- Origin: Nottingham, England
- Genres: Sludge metal; noise rock; alternative metal
- Years active: 1989–1995
- Labels: Vinyl Solution; Earache; Relativity; Columbia
- Spinoffs: Nailbomb
- Past members: Alex Newport; David Ryley; Adrian Parkin

Fudge Tunnel were an English band formed in Nottingham by Alex Newport, David Ryley, and Adrian Parkin. They were known for combining the noise rock and sludge metal genres, with their sound being compared to bands such as Melvins and Nirvana. From 1989 to 1995, the band released three studio albums and three studio EPs on various notable labels such as Earache Records, Relativity Records, and Columbia Records.

== History ==
Fudge Tunnel formed in 1989. They released their debut EP on Pigboy/Vinyl Solution in 1989, Fudge Tunnel. Although marketed as an EP, due to its short length, it was named "Single of the Week" in NME magazine in January 1990, with NME declaring "Absolutely and totally the best single ever to be released in 1990. Total nine guitar attack-rock". The band followed up with their second EP, The Sweet Sound of Excess, in 1990, again on Pigboy/Vinyl Solution. Fudge Tunnel also found support via DJ John Peel as they recorded a Peel Session in 1990. They then signed to Nottingham's Earache Records. Their full-length debut album was 1991's Hate Songs in E Minor, which attracted a large amount of press interest after the original album artwork was confiscated by the Nottingham Vice Squad.

Fudge Tunnel's reputation was built around their massive guitar sound and ironic sense of humour, and they were popular with the British music press, initially. The band undertook several European tours in 1991 and 1992 including support slots with Fugazi, Silverfish, and The Jesus Lizard, as well as support slots with Swervedriver, Godflesh, and regular performances at popular London venues The Camden Falcon and Camden Underworld. The Teeth EP was released in 1992. That same year, the band's former label Pigboy released Fudgecake, which combined the Fudge Tunnel and The Sweet Sound of Excess EPs into one package.

Fudge Tunnel's second full-length album, Creep Diets, was released in 1993. It received wider distribution due to Earache's deal with the major label Columbia Records. 1994 saw the release of the band's final album, The Complicated Futility of Ignorance, albeit only on Earache. In the months leading up to the album's release, Fudge Tunnel toured in the US alongside Fear Factory, Clutch, and Sepultura. Around the same time, Newport was active with Nailbomb, a collaboration with Sepultura's Max Cavalera, who released one studio album and one live album of their Dynamo Open Air festival performance. Fudge Tunnel considered The Complicated Futility of Ignorance to be their best album and, satisfied with what they had achieved, quietly disbanded in late 1995, just after the release of the compilation In a Word (which contained various outtakes and b-sides).

Following Fudge Tunnel's disbandment, Ryley ran his label BGR Records for a number of years. He eventually joined the band Island Apes in the early 2020s. Parkin played with Tubesurfer until 1996 when they too split up, and then returned to being a quantity surveyor in Bolton. Newport went on to pursue a successful career as a producer/mixer. He later moved to New York in order to run his own studio. He has produced albums by At the Drive-In, The Mars Volta, Bloc Party, City and Colour, and many others. He also formed the band Theory of Ruin, who released one album (Counter Culture Nosebleed) and one EP (Front Line Poster Child), both on Escape Artist Records. Newport also played in Red Love with former Bloc Party member Matt Tong. Their self-titled debut album was released in 2017.

In May 2020, Fudge Tunnel released the live compilation Best of the Desk: Volume One, Live in Europe 1993, featuring recordings from various shows on the band's 1993 European tour. Another live album, Sloppy Noise Rock, was released in 2021. It featured various live recordings from 1989 and 1990.

== Influences ==
Fudge Tunnel cited influences including Big Black, Black Flag and Black Sabbath.

== Members ==
- Alex Newport – vocals, guitars (1989–1995)
- Adrian Parkin – drums (1989–1995)
- David Ryley – bass (1989–1995)

== Discography ==
=== Studio releases ===
- Fudge Tunnel (1989, Pigboy/Vinyl Solution)
- The Sweet Sound of Excess (1990, Pigboy/Vinyl Solution)
- Hate Songs in E Minor (1991, Earache/Relativity)
- Teeth (1992, Earache/Relativity)
- Creep Diets (1993, Earache/Columbia)
- The Complicated Futility of Ignorance (1994, Earache)

=== Compilation albums ===
- Fudgecake (1992, Pigboy/Vinyl Solution/Cargo)
- In a Word (1995, Earache)
- Best of the Desk: Volume One, Live in Europe 1993 (2020, Independent)
- Sloppy Noise Rock (2021, Independent)

=== Singles ===
- "Sunshine of Your Love" (1991, Earache/Relativity)
- "Ten Percent" (1993, Earache/Columbia)
- "Grey" (1993, Earache/Columbia)
- "The Joy of Irony" (1994, Earache)
