= Strength Power Will Passion =

Studio album by Holy Moses
- Released: May 2005
- Genre: Thrash metal
- Length: 66:04
- Label: Armageddon
- Producer: Michael Hankel

Holy Moses chronology
Disorder of the Order (2002)	Strength Power Will Passion (2005)	Agony of Death (2008)

Professional ratings
Review scores
Source	Rating
AllMusic	3.5/5 stars

Strength Power Will Passion is the ninth studio album by German thrash metal band Holy Moses. It was released in May 2005 on Armageddon Music. Track 12 includes a hidden track.

== Track listing ==
All songs written by Sabina Classen and Michael Hankel.

1. "Angel Cry" – 3:41
2. "End of Time" – 3:48
3. "Symbol of Spirit" – 3:41
4. "Examination" – 4:15
5. "I Will" – 3:41
6. "Space Clearing" – 4:34
7. "Sacred Crystals" – 3:48
8. "Lost Inside" – 3:44
9. "Death Bells II" – 3:44
10. "Rebirthing" – 2:35
11. "Seasons in the Twilight" – 3:57
12. "Say Goodbye" – 24:36
13. "Im Wagen vor Mir" [Hidden Track] 3:07

== Credits ==
- Sabina Classen – vocals
- Franky Brotz – guitar
- Michael Hankel – guitar
- Alex DeBlanco – bass
- Julien Schmidt – drums
- Tom Angelripper – vocals on track 13
