= Finished with the Dogs =

Studio album by Holy Moses
- Released: March 1987
- Recorded: Phönix Studio Bochum
- Genre: Thrash metal
- Length: 47:55 (re-issue)
- Label: AAARRG Records
- Producer: Ralph Hubert

Holy Moses chronology
Queen of Siam (1986)	Finished with the Dogs (1987)	The New Machine of Liechtenstein (1989)

Finished with the Dogs is the second album by Holy Moses, released in 1987 on AAARRG Records. It was re-released on August 5, 2005, through Armageddon with 4 bonus live tracks. All music and lyrics are by Andy Classen and Sabina Classen.

== Reception ==
Blabbermouth rated the album eight out of ten, referring to it as "a friggin' classic, one that quite honestly outshines a lot of the more well-known albums of the day."

== Track listing ==
1. "Finished with the Dogs" - 2:31
2. "Current of Death" - 2:38
3. "Criminal Assault" - 3:22
4. "In the Slaughterhouse" - 2:32
5. "Fortress of Desperation" - 3:52
6. "Six Fat Women" - 2:58
7. "Corroded Dreams" - 4:01
8. "Life's Destroyer" - 2:55
9. "Rest in Pain" - 3:17
10. "Military Service" - 3:39

=== 2005 reissue bonus tracks ===
11. "Road Crew"
12. "Life's Destroyer" (live in Bad Salzungen - Wacken Roadshow - May 2005)
13. "Current of Death" (live in Munich - Wacken Roadshow - May 2005)
14. "In the Slaughterhouse" (live in Munich - Wacken Roadshow - May 2005)
15. "Finished with the Dogs" (live in Stonehenge Festival, Holland - July 2004)

== Personnel ==
- Sabina Classen - vocals
- Andy Classen - guitars, backing vocals (lead vocals on "Road Crew")
- Andre Chapalier - bass
- Uli Kusch - drums, backing vocals
