= The New Machine of Liechtenstein =

The New Machine of Lichtenstein

Studio album by Holy Moses
- Released: 1989
- Recorded: Horus Sound Studio, Hannover
- Genre: Thrash metal
- Length: 35:55
- Label: WEA
- Producer: Alex Perialas and Holy Moses

Holy Moses chronology
Finished with the Dogs (1987)	The New Machine of Lichtenstein (1989)	World Chaos (1990)

The New Machine of Liechtenstein is the third album by Holy Moses, released in 1989 on WEA. It was re-released on 5 August 2005 through Armageddon and then in 2007 by Locomotive with 2 bonus live tracks.

All music composed and arranged by Andy Classen and Uli Kusch. Lyrics by Sabina Classen and Andy Classen.

== Track listing ==
1. "Near Dark" - 5:31
2. "Defcon II" - 4:10
3. "Panic" - 3:05
4. "Strange Deception" - 4:18
5. "Locky Popster" - 3:39
6. "SSP (Secret Service Project)" - 3:15
7. "State: Catatonic" - 3:51
8. "The Brood" - 2:50
9. "Lost in the Maze" - 5:16

=== Reissue bonus tracks ===
"SSP" (live in Bad Salzungen/Kallewerk 14 May 2005 at Wacken Roadshow)
1. "Lost in the Maze" (live at Rock Harz Festival Osterode, 9 July 2005)

== Personnel ==
- Sabina Classen - vocals
- Andy Classen - guitar
- Tom Becker - bass
- Uli Kusch - drums
