= Hate Songs in E Minor =

Album by Fudge Tunnel

Studio album by Fudge Tunnel
- Released: May 1991
- Studios: Sawmills (Golant, Cornwall); Frontier (Beeston, Nottinghamshire)
- Genres: Sludge metal; alternative metal
- Length: 45:37
- Label: Earache
- Producers: Colin Richardson; Fudge Tunnel

Fudge Tunnel chronology
Hate Songs in E Minor (1991)	Creep Diets (1993)

Hate Songs in E Minor is the debut studio album by British rock band Fudge Tunnel. It was released in May 1991 through Earache Records, and issued in the United States on 20 August 1991 through Relativity Records. It followed in the wake of two critically acclaimed EPs (Fudge Tunnel in 1989 and The Sweet Sound of Excess in 1990, both on Pigboy/Vinyl Solution), after which the group were signed to Earache. The album consists of 11 songs, 9 of which were written by the band and 2 covers: "Sunshine of Your Love", originally recorded by the band Cream, while the last track on the disc, "Cat Scratch Fever" was originally recorded by Ted Nugent. The album is also dedicated to Nugent.

Hate Songs in E Minor presented a new and broader approach by the label following the success of more experimental and electronic Godflesh. Fudge Tunnel could also be considered a British response to the sound of bands like Melvins, Nirvana and Swans in the US. Early pressings of the LP edition of the album included a bonus 7" containing the track "Joined at the Dick".

== Cover artwork and police raid ==
The originally-planned cover art was a "ridiculous" drawing of a man being decapitated that the band's Alex Newport later described as "quite silly and not very offensive". However, following a raid on Earache Records' offices- relating to a photo intended for use by another artist- the band's artwork was confiscated by police. As a result, the album- whose release date was imminent- had its cover replaced at short notice with a live photo.

Charges were later dropped and the artwork returned. However, this was too late for the original album release, and the band later used the original design on t-shirts instead.

== Critical reception ==
Professional ratings
Review scores
Source	Rating
AllMusic	4/5 stars
The Boston Phoenix	2.5/4 stars
Collector's Guide to Heavy Metal	6/10
The Encyclopedia of Popular Music	3/5 stars
The Great Metal Discography	8/10
Hit Parader	4/5 stars
Kerrang!	5/5 stars
Metal Hammer	5/5
NME	7/10
Vox	9/10

Spin wrote that the album is "hardcore meets guitar rock at its loudest and finest." The Calgary Herald determined that "Fudge Tunnel's trying to negotiate that well-travelled, guitar-grungy, Sub-Pop highway, but with a dearth of real energy and an abundance of redundant, spongy riffs". The Gazette opined that "these Brit Soundgarden wannabes and their smartass noise miss the one key ingredient: virtually none of it is believable, and the giveaways are witless covers of 'Sunshine of Your Love' and 'Cat Scratch Fever'."

In 2005, Kerrang! ranked the album at number 92 on its list of the "100 Best British Rock Albums Ever".

== Track listing ==
All tracks are written by Alex Newport, except where noted.

No.	Title	Length
1.	"Hate Song"	5:28
2.	"Bed Crumbs"	2:18
3.	"Spanish Fly"	5:25
4.	"Kitchen Belt"	3:51
5.	"Hate Song (Version)"	3:16
6.	"Boston Baby"	3:40
7.	"Gut Rot"	3:55
8.	"Soap and Water"	3:41
9.	"Tweezers"	3:16
10.	"Sunshine of Your Love" (Jack Bruce, Pete Brown, Eric Clapton)	7:26
11.	"Cat Scratch Fever" (Ted Nugent)	2:57

== Personnel ==
Fudge Tunnel

- Alex Newport – guitars, vocals
- David Ryley – bass guitar
- Adrian Parkin – drums, percussion

Production

- Colin Richardson – production
- Fudge Tunnel – production
- John Cornfield – recording, engineering

== Use in media ==
In April 2007, Earache Records included "Hate Song" on a six-disc, 100-plus-track box set titled Metal: A Headbanger's Companion. In September 2007, "Gut Rot" and "Soap and Water" were included in the compilation's sequel, Metal: A Headbanger's Companion II.
