= Reborn Dogs =

Studio album by Holy Moses
- Released: 1 October 1992
- Studio: Stage One Studio, Bühne
- Genre: Thrash metal
- Length: 39:12
- Label: West Virginia
- Producer: Andy Classen

Holy Moses chronology
Terminal Terror (1991)	Reborn Dogs (1992)	No Matter What's the Cause (1994)

Reborn Dogs is the sixth studio album by German thrash metal band Holy Moses, released in 1992. The album was re-issued on 1 March 2006.

== Track listing ==
1. "Clash My Soul" - 2:26
2. "Decapitated Mind" - 3:31
3. "Welcome to the Real World" - 3:32
4. "Reborn Dogs" - 3:45
5. "Fuck You" - 3:24
6. "Third Birth" - 3:10
7. "Deadicate" - 4:10
8. "The Five Year Plan (D.R.I. Cover)" - 3:46
9. "Process of Pain" - 2:59
10. "Reverse" - 3:08
11. "Dancing with the Dead" - 5:21

== Personnel ==
- Sabina Classen - vocals
- Andy Classen - guitar
- Benny Schnell - bass
- Sven Herwig - drums

Drums on the record played by Friso van Wijck (Polluted Inheritance)
