= Queen of Siam (Holy Moses album) =

Studio album by Holy Moses
- Released: May 1986
- Genre: Thrash metal
- Length: 36:52
- Label: AAARRG Records
- Producer: Ralph Hubert

Holy Moses chronology
Queen of Siam (1986)	Finished with the Dogs (1987)

Queen of Siam is the debut album by German thrash metal band Holy Moses, released in 1986 on AAARRG Records. It was re-released in 2005 with the "Walpurgisnight" demo, recorded in 1984–1985, as bonus tracks. All music and lyrics are by Andy Classen and Sabina Classen.

== Track listing ==
1. "Necropolis" – 3:39
2. "Don't Mess Around with the Bitch" – 5:35
3. "Devil's Dancer" – 4:20
4. "Queen of Siam" – 4:24
5. "Roadcrew" – 3:12
6. "Walpurgisnight" – 3:21
7. "Bursting Rest" – 3:39
8. "Dear Little Friend" – 5:36
9. "Torches of Hire" – 3:06

=== 2005 reissue bonus tracks ===
10. "Intro"
11. "Walpurgisnight"
12. "Bursting Rest"
13. "Torches for Hire"
14. "Queen of Siam"
15. "Death Bells"
16. "Heavy Metal"

== Personnel ==
- Sabina Classen – vocals
- Andy Classen – guitar, lead vocals on "Roadcrew"
- Ramon Brüsseler – bass
- Herbert Dreger – drums

== Walpurgisnight demo personnel ==
- Sabina Classen – vocals
- Andy Classen – guitar
- Ramon Brüsseler – bass
- Jörg Heins – drums
