= Holy Moses =

German thrash metal band

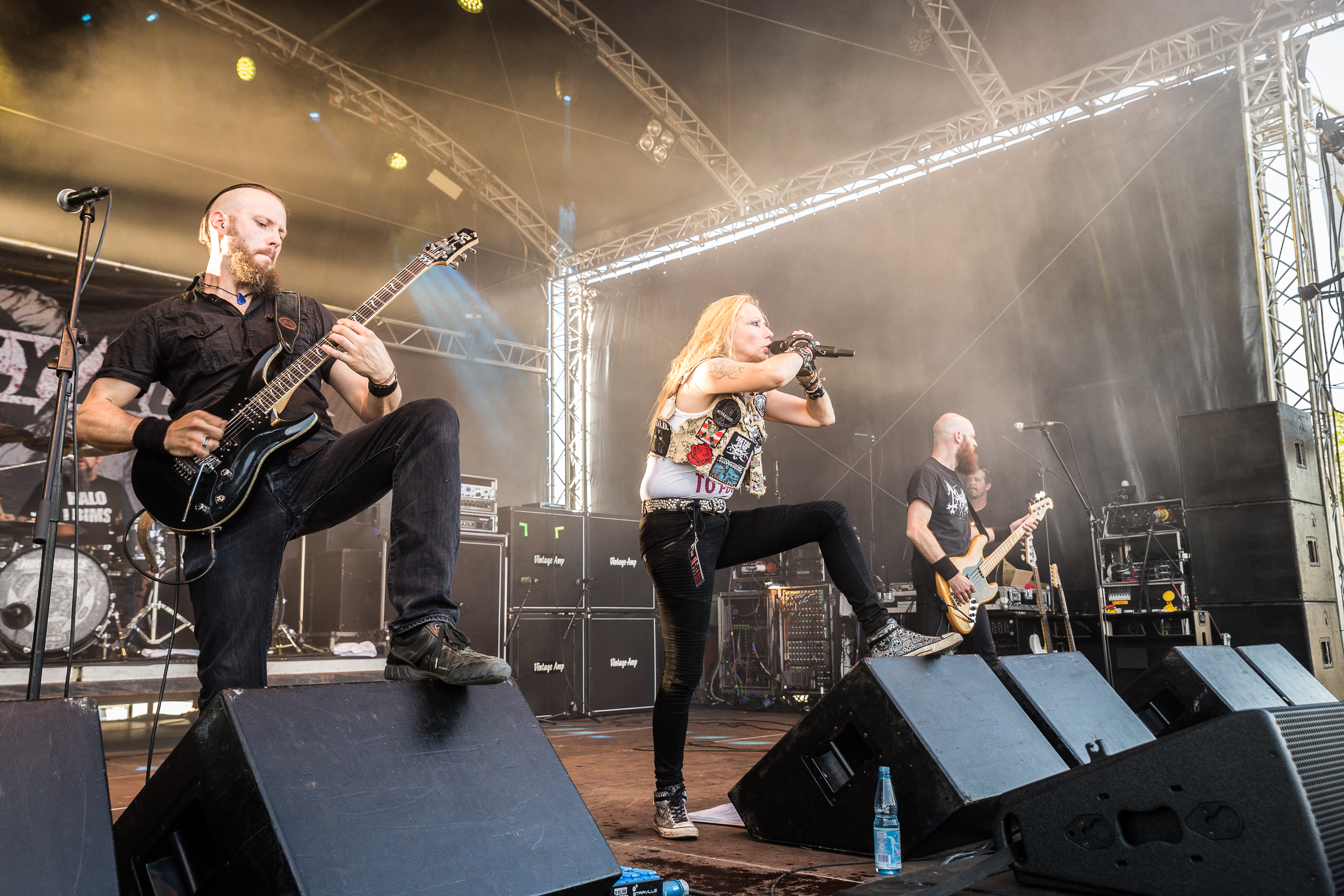
- Holy Moses live at Metal Frenzy 2018

Background information
- Origin: Aachen, West Germany
- Genre: Thrash metal
- Years active: 1980–1994, 2000–2023
- Labels: Armageddon, Aaarrg, West Virginia, WEA, Steamhammer, Century Media
- Members: Sabina Classen; Thomas Neitsch; Gerd Lücking; Peter Geltat
- Past members: Atomic Steif

Holy Moses were a German thrash metal band active from 1980 to 1994 and 2000 to 2023. They were well noted for being fronted by Sabina Classen, who was the only constant member of Holy Moses, and for being one of the first German thrash metal bands. Holy Moses released 13 studio albums, the final one being Invisible Queen in 2023.

== History ==
=== Formative years (1980–1985) ===
Holy Moses were formed in Aachen, North Rhine-Westphalia, in 1980. The band's first line-up was formed by bassist Ramon Brüssler, drummer Peter Vonderstein and guitarist Jochen Fünders during high school, the latter of whom also handled the band's vocals. This line-up played its first live show only four days after its formation, and released a demo titled Black Metal Masters in the same year. Vonderstein and Fünders left the group in 1981, and were replaced by drummer Paul Linzenich, vocalist Iggy, and guitarist Andy Classen from the local group Desaster. In December 1981, Iggy left the group and was replaced by ex-Desaster bassist and girlfriend of Andy, Sabina Classen (née Hirtz). The band performed their first live show with the new stable line-up in November 1982 and released a string of demo tapes, including Walpurgis Night in 1985, and The Bitch in 1986, and also appeared on the split-album compilation Metallic Bunnys.

=== Success (1986–1993) ===
In 1986, Holy Moses released their debut album Queen of Siam through independent label Aaarrg, with Herbert Dreger on drums (Linzenich left shortly before the recording to focus on his university studies). After the release of the record, Dreger was sacked for not showing up to a support show with Agent Steel, and Brüssler (the only original member of Holy Moses remaining), left the band. Both members were replaced by nineteen-year-old Uli Kusch and Andre Chapelier respectively. The following year, Holy Moses released their sophomore effort Finished With the Dogs, which was a much heavier and cleaner-sounding album than its predecessor. The album was a critical success around the world, earning the band a distribution deal through Warner Music Group (WEA) and tours of Europe with Angel Dust, Rage, Steeler, Paganini, D.R.I. and Holy Terror, finishing with a headlining show in Hamburg.

In 1988, Sabina Classen became the host of a German heavy metal TV show called Mosh alongside journalist Götz Kühnemund. Meanwhile, Holy Moses began work on their third studio album. Released in 1989, The New Machine of Liechtenstein became another successful record from the group, with the band playing heavier and more technical thrash metal than on the previous two albums. The band toured with Sacred Reich and Forbidden, and performed at the Dynamo Open Air Festival, with second guitarist Rainer Laws added to the line-up. Around this time, Holy Moses severed their ties with Warner Music Group, as a result of the record company's new staff trying to coerce the band into departing from their thrash metal influences and write more commercial music.

In 1990, Laws quit Holy Moses due to illness and retired to focus his skills as a graphic artist, leaving the band as a four-piece. The band then recorded World Chaos, released through West Virginia Records, an independent label owned by new band manager Uli Wiehagen. Kusch soon quit the band to join Gamma Ray, to be replaced by Atomic Steif. In 1992 he left and was replaced by Sven "Meff" Hervig, who played all drums on Terminal Terror (1991) as a session drummer.

Soon after the release of Reborn Dogs, Sabina Classen left Holy Moses and the band subsequently dissolved. Classen went to form Temple of the Absurd with Warpath members Schrödey and Ozzy Frese, and drummer Mike Rech.

=== Hiatus (1994–2000) ===
Two years after the split of Holy Moses, Andy Classen released a new record under the Holy Moses moniker titled No Matter What's the Cause. The line-up featured on the album included Classen on guitar and vocals, S.O.D.'s Dan Lilker on bass, and drummer Meff. The album was more hardcore/death metal influenced than the band's previous thrash-oriented efforts, and was not met with substantial success.

=== Reformation and retirement (2000–2023) ===
In 1999, during touring for the second Temple of the Absurd album, Sabina Classen collapsed on stage and was hospitalised. The singer fell into a serious illness and suffered a motorcycle crash in 2000. Following this, Temple of the Absurd disbanded and Sabina began to work with Andy again on what would eventually become new Holy Moses material. The band was reformed in early 2001 with Franky Brotz and Joern Schubert on guitar, Jochen Fünders on bass and Julien Schmidt on drums. The band performed several comeback shows throughout Europe and South Korea, and released an EP titled Master of Disaster through Century Media. Andy Classen stayed with the band as songwriter.

In 2002, Holy Moses released Disorder of the Order, their first album with the new line-up. Michael Hankel, guitarist of Erosion and friend of Andy's, replaced Schubert soon after the album's release, and became a main songwriter of the band. The band performed at Wacken Open Air festival in 2004, and after fan demand for another Holy Moses album, the group released Strength Power Will Passion in May the following year. It is the first album without input from Andy Classen. After securing a deal through Wacken Records and a subsequent re-release of the band's material, Fünders and Schmidt left Holy Moses to be replaced by Thomas Neitsch and a returning Atomic Steif.

Holy Moses released their tenth album Agony of Death in 2008 with all music written by new guitar player Oliver Jaath and Michael Hankel. They released their eleventh album Redefined Mayhem on 28 April 2014. The band's twelfth and final album Invisible Queen was released on 14 April 2023.

Holy Moses retired towards the end of 2023, with their final show taking place in Hamburg at the Market Hall on 27 December of that year, in celebration of frontwoman Sabina Classen-Hirtz's 60th birthday.

== Band members ==
Holy Moses live at Metal Frenzy 2018 in Gardelegen

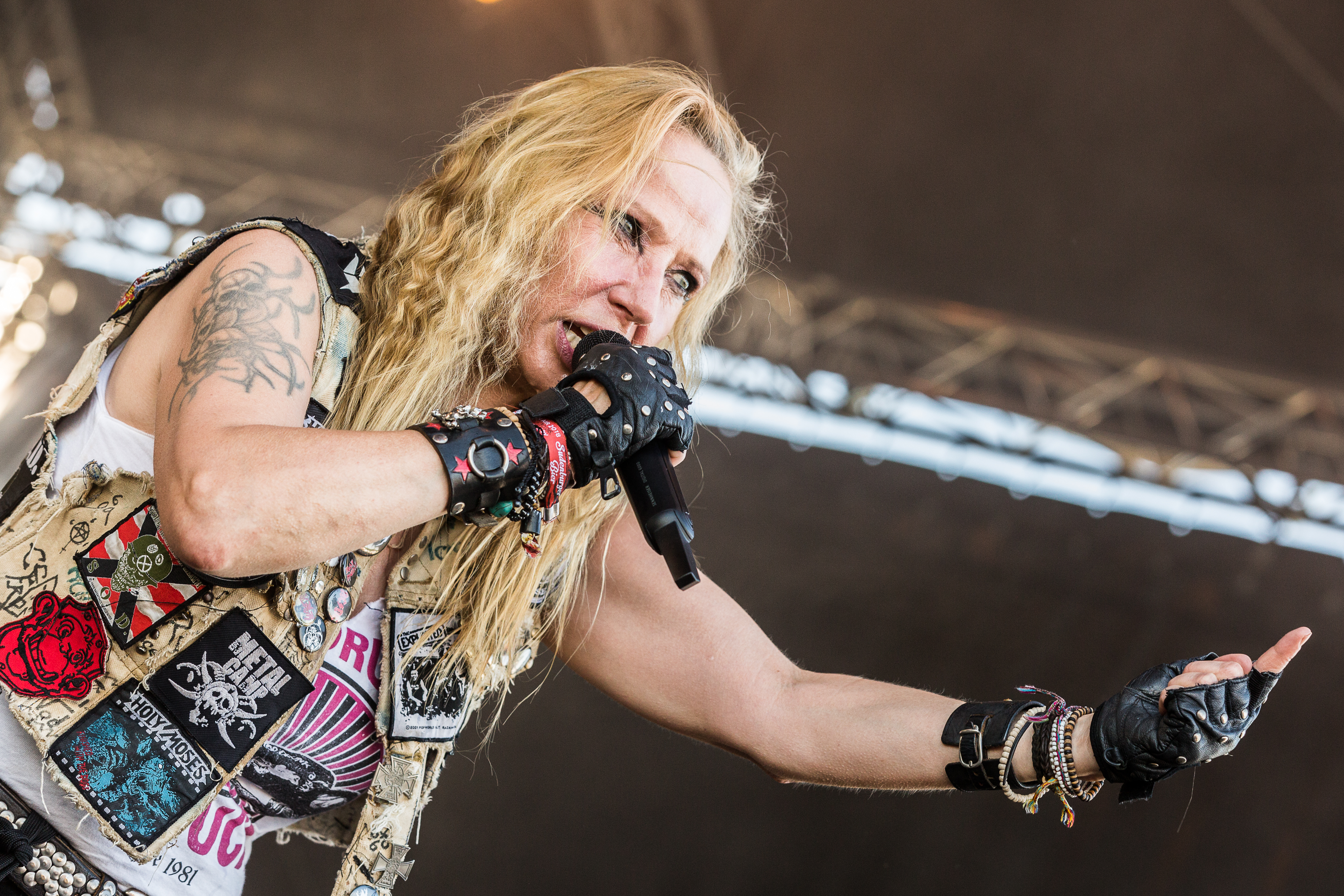
Sabina Classen-Hirtz

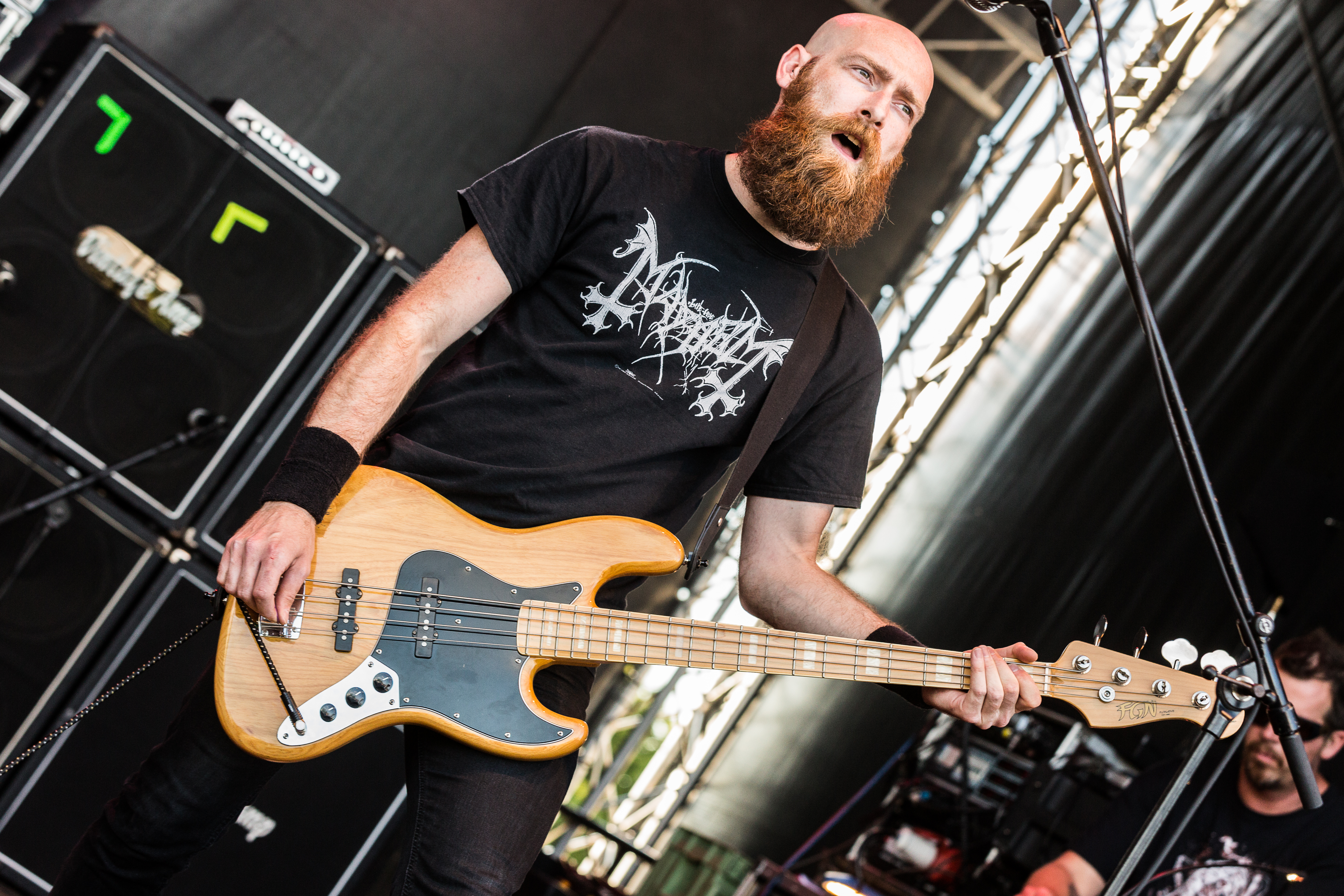
Thomas Neitsch

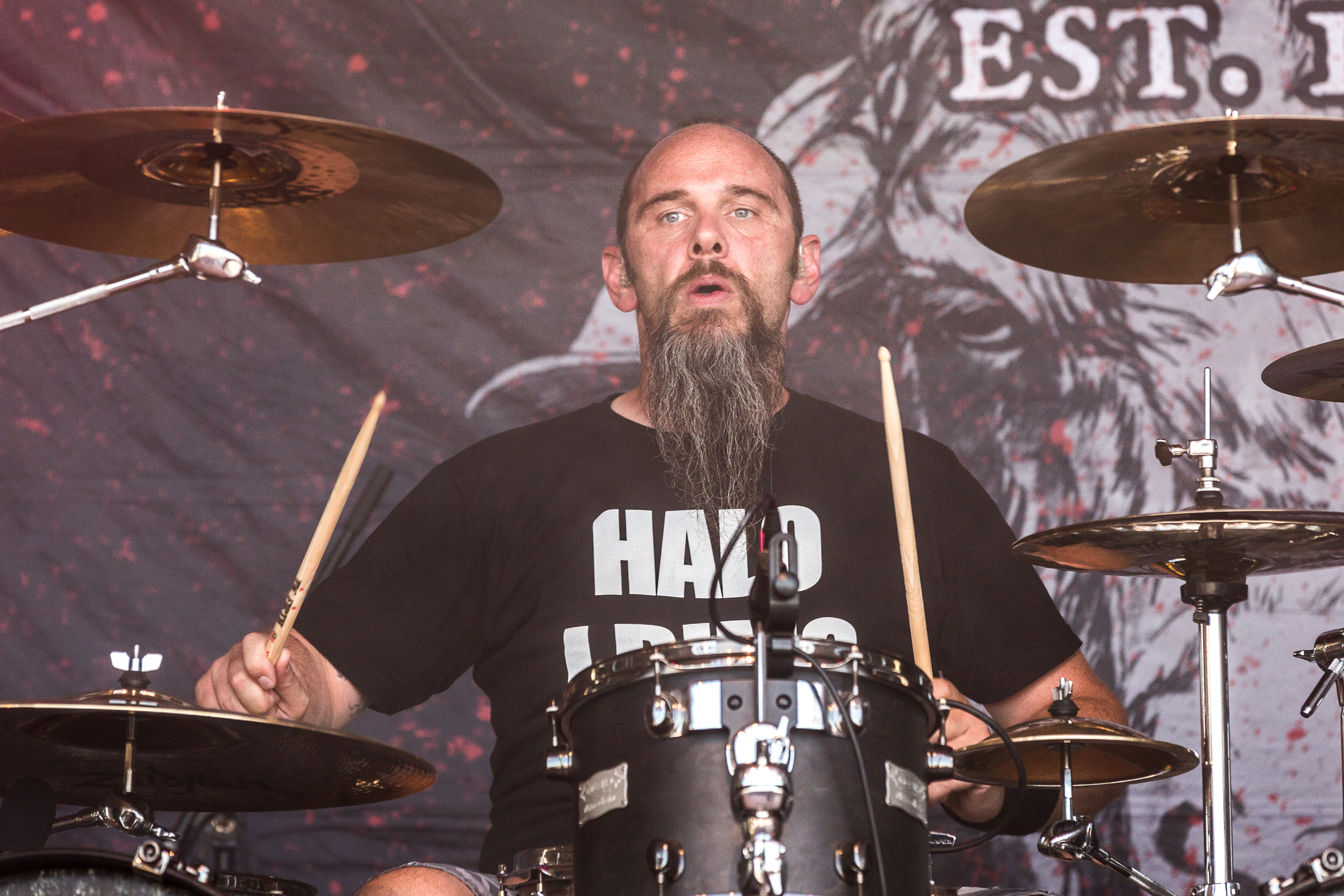
Gerd Lücking

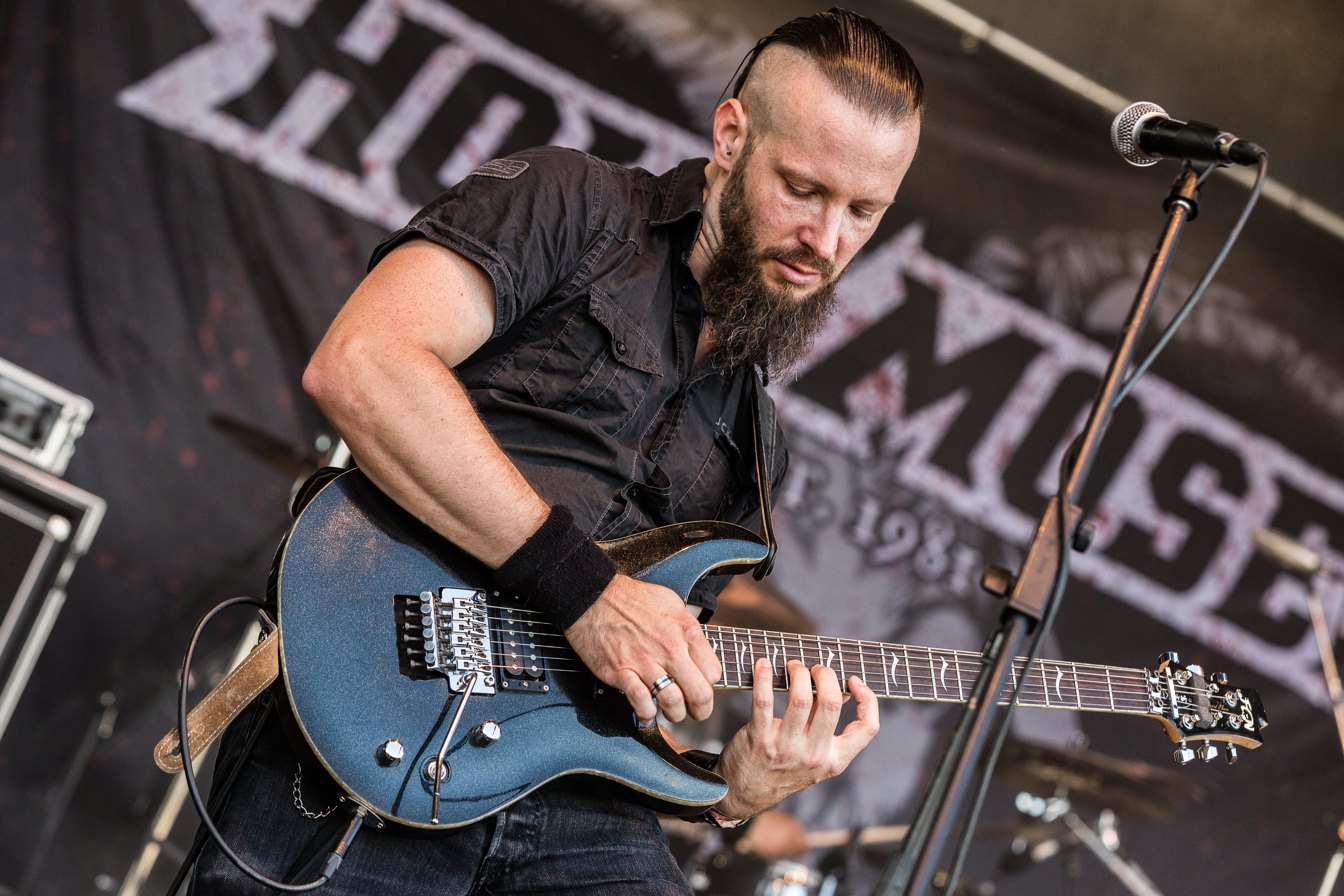
Peter Geltat

=== Last lineup ===
- Sabina Classen – lead vocals (1981–1984, 1984–1994, 2000–2023)
- Thomas Neitsch – bass, backing vocals (2008–2023)
- Gerd Lücking – drums (2011–2023)
- Peter Geltat – guitars, backing vocals (2012–2023)

== Discography ==
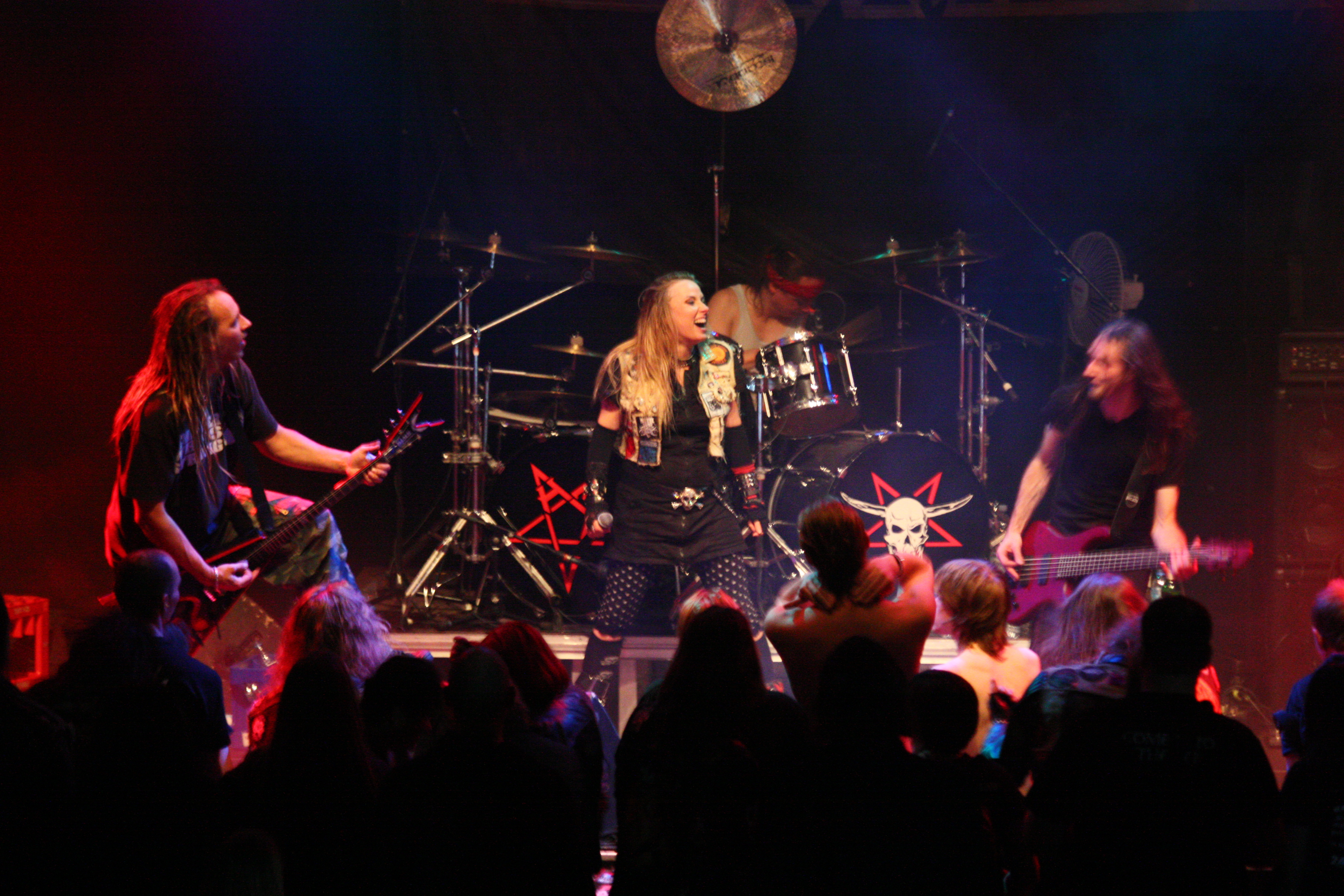
Holy Moses performing in 2009

=== Albums ===
- Queen of Siam (1986)
- Finished with the Dogs (1987)
- The New Machine of Liechtenstein (1989)
- World Chaos (1990)
- Terminal Terror (1991)
- Reborn Dogs (1992)
- No Matter What's the Cause (1994)
- Disorder of the Order (2002)
- Strength Power Will Passion (2005)
- Agony of Death (2008)
- Redefined Mayhem (2014)
- Invisible Queen (2023)

=== Demos and EP ===
- Holy Moses (1981)
- Satan's Angel (1982)
- Call of the Demon (1983)
- Heavy Metal (1983)
- Death Bells (1984)
- Walpurgisnight (1985)
- The Bitch (1986)
- Master of Disaster (2001)
- The Final Reign (2023)

=== Compilations ===
- Too Drunk to Fuck (1993)
- 30th Anniversary – In the Power of Now (2012) (2CD)
