= Terminal Terror =

Studio album by Holy Moses
- Released: 1 August 1991
- Studios: Stage One Studios, Bühne (Borgentreich)
- Genre: Thrash metal
- Length: 36:00
- Label: West Virginia
- Producer: Andy Classen

Holy Moses chronology
World Chaos (1990)	Terminal Terror (1991)	Reborn Dogs (1992)

Terminal Terror is the fifth full-length album release by the German thrash metal band Holy Moses.

== Track listing ==
All lyrics are written by Sabina Classen; all music is composed by Holy Moses.

No.	Title	Length
1.	"Nothing for My Mum"	4:03
2.	"Two Sides Terror"	4:45
3.	"Theotocy (Terminal Terror)"	3:48
4.	"Creation of Violation"	4:40
5.	"Pool of Blood"	3:44
6.	"Distress and Death"	4:53
7.	"Adult Machine"	4:13
8.	"Malicious Race"	3:00
9.	"Tradition of Fatality"	2:54
