= No Matter What's the Cause =

Studio album by Holy Moses
- Released: 1 August 1994
- Genre: Thrashcore
- Length: 35:59
- Label: SPV/Steamhammer

Holy Moses chronology
Reborn Dogs (1992)	No Matter What's the Cause (1994)	Disorder of the Order (2002)

No Matter What's the Cause is the seventh full-length studio album by the German thrash metal band Holy Moses.

== Track listing ==
All lyrics are written by Sabina Classen; all music is composed by Holy Moses.

No.	Title	Length
1.	"Upon Your Tongue"	1:02
2.	"A Word to Say"	2:05
3.	"Step Ahead"	2:35
4.	"Acceptance"	3:54
5.	"Just Because"	2:42
6.	"What's Up"	2:41
7.	"Senseless One"	1:40
8.	"Denial"	1:49
9.	"Hate Is Just a 4 Letter Word (Shock Therapy cover)"	6:17
10.	"On You"	2:59
11.	"I Feel Sick"	3:26
12.	"No Solution"	2:08
13.	"Bomber (Motörhead cover)"	2:41

== Credits ==
- Andy Classen - Guitars, Vocals
- Dan Lilker - Bass
- Sven Herwing - Drums
