= Culprit (band) =

American heavy metal band

- (L-R) John DeVol, Jeff L'Heureux, Bud Burrill, Kjartan Kristoffersen, and Scott Earl (front)

Background information
- Origin: Seattle, Washington, U.S.
- Genres: Heavy metal
- Years active: 1982–1985, 2010–present
- Labels: Shrapnel Records, Hellion Records
- Members: Scott Earl; Gabriel Colon; Fred Aching; P.J. Toyne
- Past members: Jeff L'Heureux; Kjartan Kristoffersen; John DeVol; Bud Burrill; Steve Nations; Tim Kleiman; Saul Ashley; Mino Mereu; Lamar Little; Patrick Abbate
- Website: culpritusa.com

Culprit is an American heavy metal band formed in Seattle, Washington, in 1981 by vocalist Jeff L'Heureux, guitarists John DeVol and Kjartan Kristoffersen, bassist Scott Earl, and drummer Bud Burrill. Their debut album Guilty as Charged was first released through Shrapnel Records in 1983 and later again through Hellion Records in 2000. The band broke up in 1985 and each of its members moved on to other endeavors.

== History ==
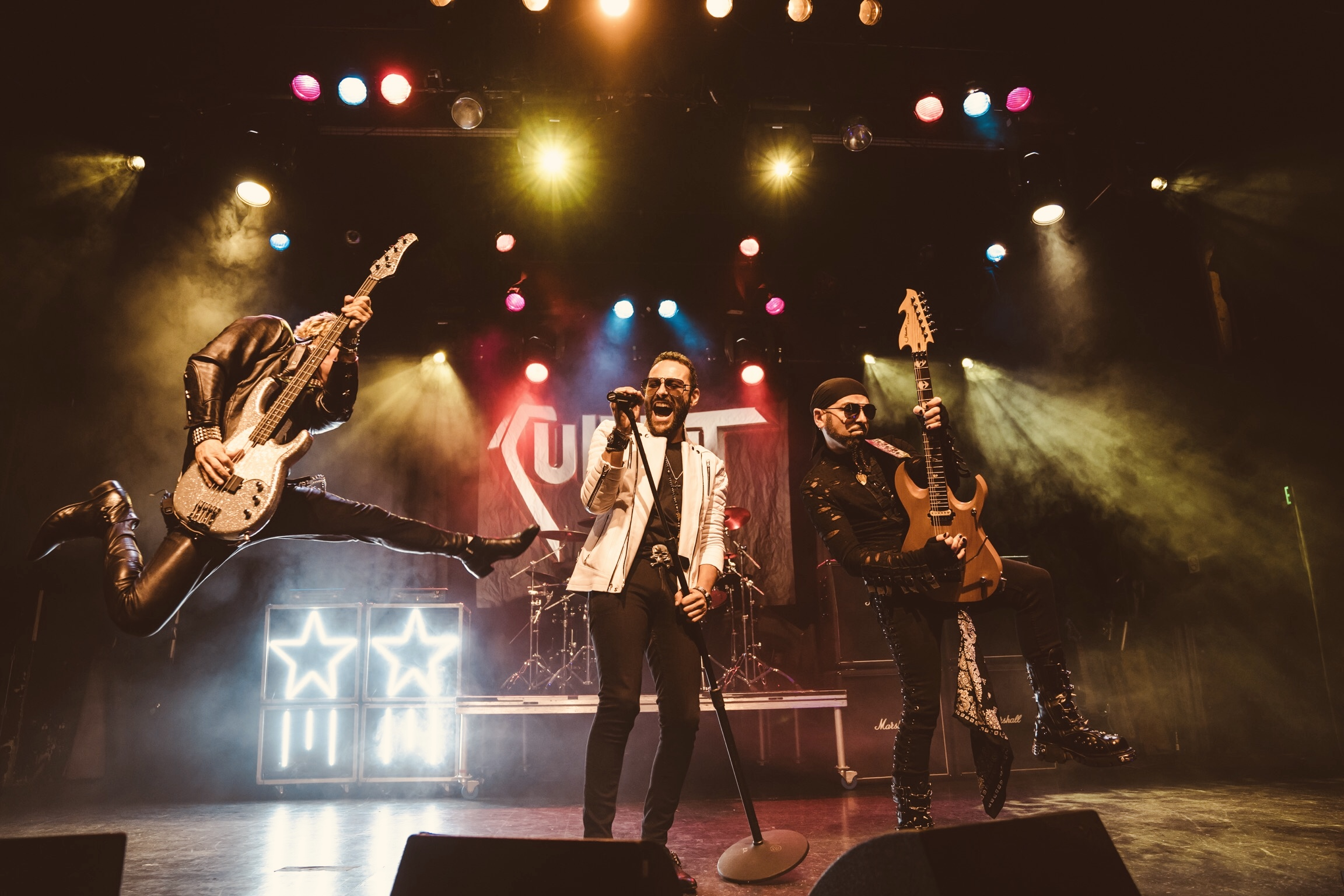
Culprit in 2018

=== Formation (1981–1985) and Guilty as Charged ===
Culprit was the result of a merger between two Seattle area bands named Orpheus and Amethyst in 1981. Guitarist John DeVol, bassist Scott Earl, and drummer Bud Burrill played in Orpheus while vocalist Jeff L'Heureux and guitarist Kjartan Kristoffersen were in Amethyst. These five musicians first came together when their respective bands played at a mutual gig. They later got together with plans on forming a new band, which they ultimately named Culprit. This new band got their first taste of success in 1982 when their debut song "Players" was selected on Shrapnel Records' U.S. Metal, Vol. 2 compilation. Shortly afterward, Culprit signed a proper recording contract with Shrapnel and began work on their debut album.

In 1983, Culprit released their first and only studio album thus far Guilty as Charged to much critical acclaim. Eduardo Rivadavia of AllMusic gave the album four and a half stars, calling it "a lost gem of American metal from the 1980s, and well worth seeking out for fans of other bands from the period." Scott Earl left the band in 1984 and the band broke up soon after.

=== Post-break-up and reunion (1986–present) ===
Following the break-up, L'Heureux became lead vocalist for the band Mistrust. Meanwhile Kristoffersen and Earl joined the band TKO, appearing on their third album Below the Belt, before relocating to Hollywood, California and forming The Bang Gang, which released Love Sells... in 1990 on Sinclair/MCA Records; and John Devol went on to record and release music with his subsequent bands Devol, Porkfinger, and Stonebender.

In 2000, Guilty as Charged was re-released on CD for the first time through Hellion Records. The original lineup has reunited on various occasions for one-off shows, most recently in 2001. In 2005, they released a compilation album of rarities titled Innocent 'Til Proven Guilty.

Throughout the 2010s, the band has reformed for several reunion shows and undergone many lineup changes with founding bassist Scott Earl as the only constant member. In 2019, they released Guilty as Charged Live under the lineup of Earl, vocalist Mino Mereu, guitarist Patrick Abbate, and drummer Saul Ashley. As of 2021, the band have announced through their Facebook page that they are working on their long-awaited sophomore album tentatively titled Layin' Down the Law.

== Members ==
Current line-up

- Scott Earl – bass guitar
- Gabriel Colon – vocals
- Fred Aching – drums
- P.J. Toyne – guitar

Notable past members

- Jeff L'Heureux – vocals
- John DeVol – guitar
- Kjartan Kristoffersen – guitar
- Bud Burrill – drums
- Saul Ashley – drums
- Mino Mereu – vocals
- Patrick Abbate – guitar

== Discography ==
Studio albums

| Year | Album details |
|---|---|
| 1983 | Guilty as Charged: Released: 1983; Label: Shrapnel Records Hellion Records |

Live albums

| Year | Album details |
|---|---|
| 2019 | Guilty As Charged Live!!!: Released: 2019; Label: Independent |

Compilation albums

| Year | Album details |
|---|---|
| 2021 | First Offense: Released: 2021; Label: Lost Realm |

Other appearances

| Year | Song | Title | Label |
|---|---|---|---|
| 1982 | "Players" | U.S. Metal, Vol. 2 | Shrapnel Records |
