= Love on Ice =

American rock band

Love on Ice was an American rock band based out of Portland, Oregon, United States, in the early 1990s. The members were Dan Krueger on vocals, Dirk Sullivan on guitar, Stan Robinson on drums, and bassist Brent Williams. After strong interest from their self-released four song demo, recorded at London Bridge Studios in Seattle, they released the album Nude on Interscope Records in 1992. They soon went back to London Bridge Studios to record their next record, but due to little support from Interscope Records, the album was shelved. The band broke up shortly after. The song "Showdown" was included in the film and on the soundtrack for Bill & Ted's Bogus Journey.

== Members ==
- Dan Krueger - vocals
- Dirk Sullivan - guitar
- Stan Robinson - drums
- Brent Williams - bass on Nude
- Bryce Hyder - bass on Love on Ice

== Discography ==
- Love On Ice Demo (Interscope Records)- 1990
1. Foot In The Grave 4:35
2. Sunshine Girl 4:59
3. Backyard 4:02
4. Showdown 7:35
- Nude (Interscope Records/Eastwest Records)- 1992
1. Don't Leave Me 3:18
2. Leave Me Alone 3:02
3. Goodbye 3:21
4. Ugly 2:52
5. Mine 4:06
6. Bone Dance 3:33
7. Sweet Thing 2:18
8. Foot In The Grave 4:23
9. Gone Away 4:05
10. Country Boy 2:57
11. Backyard 2:59
12. Self In Blue 4:21
13. Can O' Worms 1:33
