= Travis Bracht =

American musician (born 1972)

- Also known as: Travis John; Uncle T; T
- Born: Travis John Bracht; March 18, 1972 (age 54)
- Origin: Lake Stevens, Washington, D.C., US
- Genres: Hard rock; post-grunge; blues; gospel; country
- Occupation: Singer-songwriter
- Instruments: Vocals; guitar; piano; drums; bass
- Years active: 1990s–present
- Labels: Capitol; Timestyle Music
- Formerly of: Peace and Silence; Second Coming; Soulbender; Post Modern Heroes

Travis Bracht is a Seattle-based singer and guitarist best known for his work with the post-grunge band Second Coming.

== Biography ==
=== Peace and Silence ===
In the early 1990s, Bracht formed the band Peace and Silence along with guitarists Rich Henry and Tim Lynch, bassist Chuck Miller, and drummer Fred Kitchens. This group released an album called Fathom That in 1993 before breaking up a few years later, reuniting for a one-time show a decade later.

=== Second Coming ===
After the break-up of Peace and Silence, Bracht joined bassist Johnny Bacolas and drummer James Bergstrom in the band Second Coming along with former Sweet Water guitarist Dudley Taft. Before they were in Second Coming, Bacolas and Bergstrom had also formed the rhythm section of Alice N' Chains, a precursor to Alice in Chains that also featured Layne Staley on vocals. Staley had made a guest appearance on L.O.V.Evil, the first album put out by Second Coming before Bracht joined them. When Staley died in 2002, Second Coming performed at the very first annual Layne Staley Tribute and Benefit Concert held later that year.

In 1998, Capitol Records put out the eponymous Second Coming, the first album featuring the Bracht-led lineup, which brought the band considerable attention. This album produced two singles titled "Soft" and "Vintage Eyes", the latter of which had a music video. Another track titled "Unknown Rider" was included on the soundtrack for the blockbuster film The Sixth Sense.

After dealing with a rather acrimonious split from both Capitol Records and Dudley Taft in the early 2000s, Second Coming regrouped with new guitarist Eric Snyder and began recording their next album 13, which was released through Timestyle music in 2003 along with a companion EP titled Acoustic.

=== Soulbender ===
In 2007, Bracht reunited with his former Peace and Silence bandmate Chuck Miller in Soulbender, filling in for his friend Nick Pollock on vocals. The Pollock-led lineup of Soulbender had played at the first Layne Staley Tribute held in 2002. The Bracht-led lineup followed suit by performing at the sixth tribute held in 2007 with Bracht sharing vocal duties with Chris Daughtry as they performed the song "Sunshine" by Alice in Chains. Later that year, Soulbender released the song "Loaded", their only released material thus far with Bracht on vocals, on the compilation album Unleashed 3 alongside several other heavy metal artists.

=== Post Modern Heroes ===
In May 2009, Bracht formed a new band called Post Modern Heroes with the other members of his previous band Peace and Silence, except for Chuck Miller. They had a different bass player who was identified only as Robot, who previously played in the band Omnivoid along with Bracht's former Second Coming bandmate Dudley Taft. In 2010, PMH independently released their eponymous debut album, Post Modern Heroes, which was well received by Seattle rock radio station KISW. They played at KISW Pain In The Grass that summer. The band dissolved in 2012.

=== Bruiser Brody ===
Glenn Cannon from Seattle-based band Windowpane brought Travis back into the Seattle scene along with guitarist JT Philips, drummer Steve Migs, and bassist Jeff Rouse. They named themselves after the wrestler, Bruiser Brody. They released an EP in October 2016, and released their first full album Everyone's Dead in November 2018, which included a cover of Post Modern Heroes' "Heart Krusher".

=== The Last Funeral (solo album) ===
On New Year's Day 2020, The Last Funeral was released with the help of crowd funding. This, according to Bracht, was written to be an open suicide note to the world (complete with the EKG sounds at the end of the final track). After the loss of friend, Shawn Smith, Bracht entered London Bridge Studios the next week and recorded the album in one weekend. The album was recorded "glassless" with everyone in the same room. On the track "Wrapped in My Memory", which was written by Smith for his friend Andrew Wood of Mother Love Bone, Bracht recorded the song in one take on the same piano Wood recorded "Crown of Thorns" with. Bracht also includes a song to his son. When asked about the content and meaning of the album, Bracht said, "I was planning on killing myself after this one."

== Discography ==
Peace and Silence discography

Year	Title	Label
1993	Fathom That	Primal

Second Coming discography

Year	Title	Label
1998	Second Coming	Timestyle/Capitol
2002	Acoustic (extended play)	Timestyle
2003	13	Timestyle

Post Modern Heroes discography

Year	Title	Label
2010	Post Modern Heroes	Self-released

Bruiser Brody discography

Year	Title	Label
2017	Bruiser Brody	Self-released
2018	Everyone's Dead	Self-released

Solo discography

Year	Title	Label
2020	The Last Funeral	Self-released

Other appearances

Year	Title	Band	Track(s)
1994	Seattle Music Scene Volume 2	Peace and Silence	"Get a Rope"
1999	Rock Sound Volume 28	Second Coming	"Soft"
2007	Unleashed 3	Soulbender	"Loaded"
