= Matt Hayward =

- Born: Matthew Hayward
- Genres: Hard rock, grunge, heavy metal
- Occupation: Musician
- Instruments: Guitar, vocals
- Years active: 2008–present
- Labels: Dekema, Wammybox

Matt Hayward is an Irish Dublin-based guitarist and songwriter. He has written and recorded with various bands and notable musicians, including My Sister's Machine singer Nick Pollock, Clannad singer/bassist Ciaran Brennan, Edie Brickell, Malfunkshun guitarist Kevin Wood, and many others. His own band Lace Weeper have become a rock staple in the Irish music scene, gaining good critical reception. Two of Matt's previous projects were signed to Dekema Records.

== Career ==
Lace Weeper to date have released 3 studio EPs, 1 live EP and two singles. Matt formed the band in late 2010 with vocalist Sebastian Florek, and shortly after they added bassist Os Andres to the lineup. Their first EP included Gavan Murray formerly of rock band Jaded Sun on drums. It was followed up in 2011 with their second EP "One Man Jury" featuring current drummer Paul Madden, and most recently in 2013 with their third studio release "Tusk". The second single they released in April 2011, was a cover of Mother Love Bone's "Crown of Thorns". Kevin Wood (Andrew Wood's brother) played lead guitar on the release as a tribute to Andy's 21 years passing. The single was released on Wammybox Records.

While on tour for Malfunkshun's 33rd anniversary in April 2013, Matt joined former Nirvana drummer Chad Channing on stage at Studio Seven in Seattle as a special guest. He joined Malfunkshun again in March 2014 at the Mike Starr of Alice in Chains memorial show in Tacoma. Lace Weeper are currently recording their debut album, which features Chad Channing playing percussion on two songs, and in July 2014 finished an Irish tour with Chad's new band Before Cars.
