= Shorewood High School =

Shorewood High School may refer to:

- Shorewood High School (Washington), located in Shoreline, Washington
- Shorewood High School (Wisconsin), located in Shorewood, Wisconsin
