= Nick Pollock =

American rock musician (born 1967)

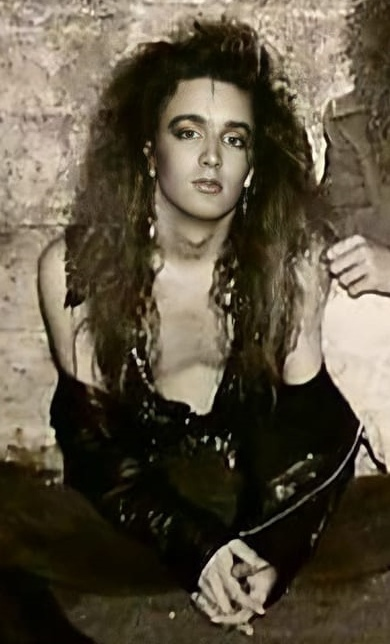
- Pollock in 1987 as part of Alice N' Chains

Background information
- Born: Nicholas Pollock; November 22, 1967 (age 58)
- Genres: Grunge; alternative metal; hard rock
- Occupation: Musician
- Instruments: Vocals; guitar
- Years active: 1986–present

Nicholas Pollock (born November 22, 1967) is an American guitarist and singer best known for his work with the Seattle grunge band My Sister's Machine. He has also played in various bands with other notable musicians, including Alice in Chains singer Layne Staley and Queensrÿche guitarist Michael Wilton. He graduated from Lindbergh High School in 1986.

== Career ==
=== Alice N' Chains ===
Around 1985-86, Pollock was invited to play guitar with the band Sleze, whose other members at the time were vocalist Layne Staley, bassist Jim Sheppard, and drummer James Bergstrom. Sheppard would leave to focus full-time on his main band Sanctuary, and he was subsequently replaced by Mike Mitchell. Eventually, Mitchell also left the band and founding guitarist Johnny Bacolas would rejoin the band on bass, and they changed their name to Alice N' Chains. The band recorded two demos and toured throughout the Seattle area for roughly one year before they broke up in 1987. Staley went on to join the band that eventually took the name Alice in Chains and became hugely successful. Alice in Chains guitarist Jerry Cantrell stated in an interview several years later that it was Pollock who first introduced him to Staley.

=== My Sister's Machine ===
After the breakup of Alice N' Chains, Pollock played for about a year in a funk band with some older musicians. In 1989, Pollock formed the band My Sister's Machine along with guitarist Owen Wright, bassist Chris Ivanovich, and drummer Chris Gohde. Since none of the other members had ever been a lead singer, Pollock got the job by default as their primary lyricist, scribbling many of his verses between customers while working at a gas station. They went on to release two studio albums, Diva and Wallflower. Pollock wrote or co-wrote every track off both those albums. Both albums were largely well received by critics. However, My Sister's Machine split up in 1994 after Elektra Entertainment folded the label they were under at that time.

In June 2010, the Layne Staley Fund announced that My Sister's Machine would be headlining the upcoming Layne Staley Tribute on August 21.

In 2017, Metal Injection ranked Alice in Chains (Staley's version) and My Sister's Machine respectively at number 1 and number 6 on their list of "10 Heaviest Grunge Bands".

=== Tanks of Zen ===
Following the breakup of My Sister's Machine, Pollock started another band called Tanks of Zen. In 2000, this band recorded a set of songs under the working title American Hangover. A music video shot in black-and-white was released for the song “Through the Red Lie”. It features all four members of the band at that time – Pollock, guitarist Tim Jones, bassist Steve Rehnstrom, and drummer Todd Marvin – performing in studio intercut with scenes of a man and a woman, portrayed respectively by Pollock and his friend Bobbi Maas Woods, fighting in a bedroom. Despite this, however, American Hangover has so far never been properly released.

In 2009, Tanks of Zen reemerged with Pollock fronting a new lineup that included bassist Dan Scott, drummer Mark Locke, and for a brief spell, second guitarist Matt Johnson. They also announced their plans to record a new set of songs under the working title Love's Gentle Maw, which has been described by the band as a concept album dealing in relationships. In 2011, Pollock announced on Facebook that Love's Gentle Maw was in the final stages of production and being mastered by Eric Janko and Eddy Schreyer, who were also involved in the production of Soulbender; Schreyer has also mastered or co-mastered Alice in Chains' first three releases Facelift, Sap and Dirt. The album was officially released on September 30, 2011.

=== Soulbender ===
In 2001, Pollock formed Soulbender with Queensrÿche guitarist Michael Wilton, guitarist Dave Groves, and drummer Wes Hallam. This group performed at the very first Layne Staley Tribute held in 2002, the year Staley died. With the addition of bass player Marten Van Keith, they released their self-titled debut album in 2004. Many observers have compared this album to Alice in Chains and Tool. Sefany Jones, a contributing editor of KNAC, listed the album among her Top 15 albums of 2004; it came in at Number Two. Pollock left Soulbender in early 2007 and was subsequently replaced by his friend Second Coming vocalist Travis Bracht. Around 2013-14, Pollock reunited with the original full line-up of Soulbender to record four new tracks to celebrate the tenth anniversary of their original release. These four track were released as part of a remastered disc titled Soulbender II.

=== The National Guard ===
In 2015, Pollock formed The National Guard along with Truly guitarist Chris Quinn (later replaced by James Chow), Minus the Bear drummer Erin Tate, and bassist Nick Rhinehart, who previously worked with Pollock's former My Sister's Machine bandmate Owen Wright in the group Old Lady Litterbug. He also played bass for Jerry Cantrell as part of the touring band, which also included Queensrÿche guitarist Chris DeGarmo and Alice in Chains drummer Sean Kinney, for Cantrell's solo debut Boggy Depot. The National Guard have so far released put out two singles, "Inauguration Day" and "Wheel".

=== Other musical projects ===
In January 2010, Pollock guest appeared with a band called Sundance Crow, led by Irish guitarist Matt Hayward; Pollock sang on their track "Silvertongue". However, the band disbanded shortly after the recording and the release was shelved but the song itself has appeared online.

== Discography ==
=== My Sister's Machine ===
Year	Title	Label
1992	Diva	Caroline
1993	Wallflower	Chamelon

=== Soulbender ===
Year	Title	Label
2004	Soulbender	Licking Lava
2014	Soulbender II	Rat Pak

=== Tanks of Zen ===
Year	Title	Label
2011	Love's Gentle Maw	Headless

=== The National Guard ===
Year	Title	Label
2020	Death Blossom	Headless

=== Other appearances ===
Year	Title	Band	Track(s)
1992	RockHard Präsentiert Virgin Summer Slam	My Sister's Machine	"I Hate You"
1993	Crossing All Over!	My Sister's Machine	"I Hate You"
1993	Crunchy Goodness	My Sister's Machine	"Steamy Swamp Thang"
1994	New Metal Ballads	My Sister's Machine	"Empty Room"
1994	Hard Music Volume 1	My Sister's Machine	"Enemy"
2008	Unleashed 4	Soulbender	"Three Towers"
2009	Unleashed 5	Soulbender	"Clockwork and Compass"
2010	Silvertongue	Sundance Crow	"Silvertongue"
