= Dudley Taft =

American musician (born 1966)

Dudley S. Taft
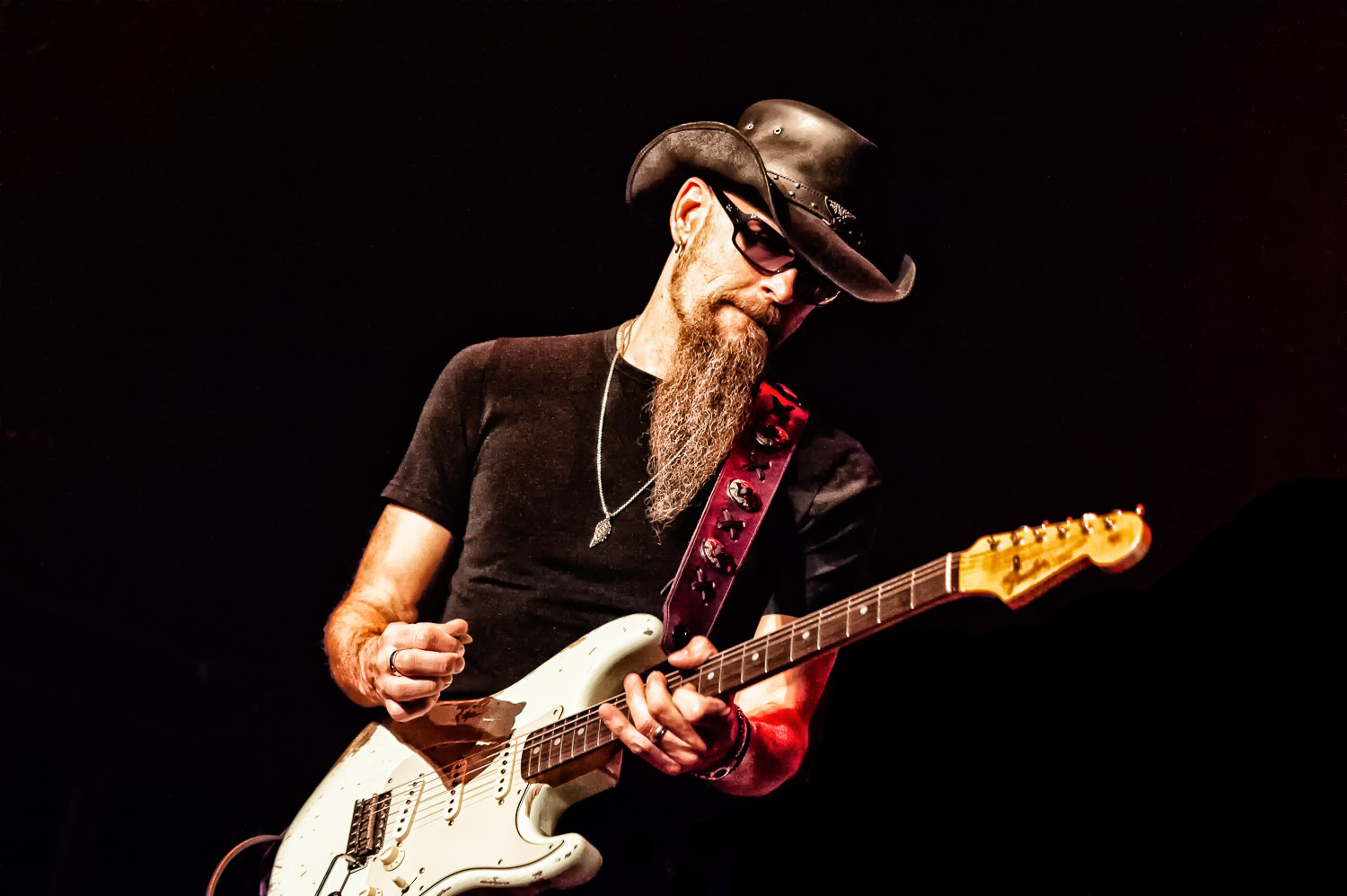
- Dudley Taft performing in Germany (photo by aliedfotografie.nl)

Background information
- Born: Dudley S. Taft Jr. July 4, 1966 (age 60)
- Origin: Washington, D.C., United States
- Genre: Rock, Blues
- Occupations: composer, songwriter, guitarist, musician, vocalist
- Instrument: Guitar
- Labels: Atlantic, East West/Elektra, Capitol Records
- Website: www.dudleytaft.com

Dudley S. Taft (born July 4, 1966, Washington, D.C.) is an American musician. Taft is a blues/rock musician who fronts the Dudley Taft Band and was a songwriting member of Seattle band Sweet Water and member and chief songwriter of Seattle, Washington-based rock band Second Coming. He is the great-great-grandnephew of United States President William Howard Taft.

== Career ==
=== Sweet Water ===
Sweet Water was initially known as SGM in the 1980s. The band changed their name to Sweet Water in 1990 upon adding Taft to the lineup as second guitarist. The band's first album under the Sweet Water name, Ter, was released in 1992 on an independent label (New Rage Records). Sweet Water then signed to Atlantic Records, followed by the release of Sweet Water in 1993. The band toured behind the album opening up for Winger, Candlebox, and Alice in Chains. The accompanying music video for the "Head Down" single was played on MTV's 120 Minutes and was added to regular rotation on M2. After shifting to EastWest Records, Sweet Water released the album Superfriends in 1995. It was produced and mixed by Dave Jerden. Taft left the band during the album's recording sessions; however, the band was dropped later that year by EastWest Records. Overall, during Taft's time in Sweet Water, the band's music appeared in MTV's Daria, Amongst Friends, Road Rules, among others.

=== Second Coming ===
In 1995 Taft joined Travis Bracht, Johnny Bacolas and James Bergstrom to form Second Coming. Starting out as a cover band called “FTA”, they wrote songs throughout 1996 and played them live at their gigs. By 1997, they started playing the Seattle area under the name Second Coming. Later that year, the band signed a six record deal with Gary Gersch, then the president of Capitol Records. Their self-titled release resulted in two Rock Radio hits that both went to #16 and #11 on the Billboard Mainstream Rock Charts in 1997 and 1998. In 1998 and 1999 the band toured with VAST, Fuel, Candlebox and Monster Magnet.

=== Omnivoid ===
After leaving Second Coming in the early 2000s, Taft formed the band Omnivoid with singer Patrick Napper, bassist Robot, and drummer Andy Gregg. They released two studio EPs titled Combustion and Ignition respectively in 2005 and 2006 before moving on to other projects.

=== Dudley Taft Band ===
Taft started a blues/rock band in 2007 under his own name, with Scott Vogel on drums and Evan Sheeley on Bass. Their first CD, entitled "Left For Dead" was released in March 2010, with a mixture of originals and traditional blues covers. The album was given five stars by John Vermilyea of Blues Underground Network. In 2011, Taft signed a two-record deal with the German-based label M.i.G. "Left For Dead" was released worldwide on August 26, 2011, with the addition of a bonus track "When The Levee Breaks".

Dudley Taft toured the Netherlands in January 2012. Reviews from bluesmagazine.nl, Keysandchords and more all rated ***** 5 stars for the "Left for Dead" CD. Taft then hired John Kessler to play bass and Chris Leighton to play drums for the next CD and live shows in Seattle and Europe. A DVD was released on March 5, 2012 called "Dudley Taft live at Highway 99," performed August 6, 2011 in Seattle, Washington.

On May 7, 2013, Taft released "Deep Deep Blue," his second blues rock studio album on his own label, American Blues Artist Group, and in Europe on M.i.G. Deep Deep Blue won the Best USA Blues Rock Album on the Underground Blues Network. Taft made three HD videos for Deep Deep Blue, "The Waiting" directed by Alex Hoelscher, starring Alyssa Lynn James; "God Forbid" directed by Matthew Kreig, and "Meet Me In The Morning" by Matt Minnotte and David Molinatto.

In the fall of 2013 Taft moved to Cincinnati, Ohio with his wife Michelle and three daughters.

"Screaming In The Wind", produced by Tom Hambridge, was released in March 2014. The band toured the US and the EU May through September, playing the Netherlands, Germany, and Poland with John Kessler on Bass, Carl Martin on drums, and Eric Robert on Keyboards. Taft made three HD videos for Screaming In The Wind, "Screaming in The Wind," "Hard Time Killing Floor Blues," and "Sleeping In The Sunlight" all directed by Alex Hoelscher. The album made the top 10 Blues Rock albums of 2014 on the Blues Underground Network, and the song "Red Line" was the #1 single on the Hit Tracks Top 100.

In February 2015, Taft went to Nashville to record keyboard overdubs on the upcoming album "Skin and Bones" with legendary keyboardist Reese Wynans of Stevie Ray Vaughan fame. The band toured Europe again in April and March 2015, and released the fourth studio album "Skin and Bones" on October 16, 2015 on the American Blues Artist Group label. The song "Skin and Bones" charted #1 on the Hit Tracks Top 100 in Europe, and #2 on the Roots Music Report's Blues Rock Radio chart. Four HD video were shot for the album; "Skin and Bones", "Leland Mississippi Blues", "Lonesome Memphis Blues" and "One of These Days" by Alex Hoelscher. The first two videos were released at the end of 2015, and the second two in the first two months of 2016. Taft's music can be heard on Pandora, Spotify, Apple Music, and other streaming services, as well as Sirus/XM's Bluesville channel 70.

The album, "Live in Europe" was released in May 2016 with 13 tracks that were recorded during the 2014 and 2015 European tours in Vriezenveen, Netherlands and Kielce, Poland. Eight cover songs and five originals populate the cd, with "Broken Down" reaching the #1 spot on the Hit Tracks Top 100 chart in Europe.

Taft's fifth studio album, "Summer Rain" released on September 15, 2017 has the same lineup as "Skin and Bones" with the addition of Kasey Williams on Bass guitar. The album consists of eleven songs penned solely by Taft.

In the fall of 2017 Taft was nominated "Best Guitarist" by the European Blues Awards. In 2018, Taft and the band played a six-week tour of Europe, which included The Netherlands, Germany, Austria, Belgium, and France, playing clubs and festivals.

Taft toured Europe in September 2019 supporting the album "Simple Life." Darby Todd played drums on this tour, and Kasey Williams played bass.

Taft returned to the EU in October and November 2022 to support the album "Cosmic Radio" which was released during the pandemic in September 2020. Nick Owsianka played the drums and Kasey Williams returned on bass.

The spring 2023 tour was with this same lineup and ran from April through May, with the release of Taft's latest studio album, "Guitar Kingdom" on April 28. "Guitar Kingdom" performed well on the Roots Music Report Charts, hitting #2 on the Blues Rock Album Chart with many songs in the top 10 on the Roots Music Song charts.

Touring throughout 2024 continued in the EU, supporting "Guitar Kingdom" with songwriting for the next album happening between tours. "The Speed of Life" was released in 2025 with improved success, hitting #1 on the Roots Music Report Charts for several weeks. Touring the EU followed the release, with shows in the Netherlands, Poland, Germany, Austria, Spain and Switzerland. Taft joined the roster of KBN booking agency based in Hamburg Germany.

Recording for Taft's 10th studio album "Fire Horse" started in Studio Svarov, just outside of Prague, Czech republic in January of 2026. Overdubs were done at Taft's home, Muchmore Studio, in Cincinnati, OH. Dave Marks produced. The album is slated for release on October 30, 2026. Taft will start a European tour November 1st to support the album, playing in Netherlands, Poland, Germany, Austria, Czech republic and Slovakia.

== Personal life ==
Dudley Taft was born in Washington, DC on July 4, 1966. He has lived in Cincinnati, Ohio; Philadelphia, Pennsylvania; Indianapolis, Indiana; Watertown, Connecticut; Los Angeles, California; Seattle, Washington; Chapel Hill, North Carolina; and now has returned to his childhood home in Cincinnati, Ohio.

Taft is a pilot, holding Private Privileges, Multi-Engine Land, Instrument and Commercial Ratings.

He serves on the Board of Directors of four charitable organizations that include the Taft Museum, The Charles Phelps Taft Fund, and The Nellie Lehman Taft Fund.

== Filmography ==
Year	Movie title	Song title	Instrument	Notes
1995	Amongst Friends	Crawl	Guitars	Writer
1998	Smoke Signals	Instrumental guitar tracks	Guitars	Writer
1998	Postkod Mil Jondren	Hot Mustard	Guitars	Writer
1999	The Sixth Sense	Unknown Rider	Guitars	Writer
2008	Prom Night	Making a Memory	Guitars	Writer
2008	Henry Poole is Here	Lucky Man	Guitars	Writer

== Television shows ==
Year	Show title	Song title	Instrument	Notes
1996	Road Rules	Soft	Guitars	Writer
1997	Daria	Soft	Guitars	Writer
1993	MTV	Head Down	Guitars	Writer
1994	Arnold Schwarzenegger Body Building Competition	Soft	Guitars	Writer
1999	Senseless Acts of Video	Soft	Guitars	Writer
1999	MTV "Biorhythm"	Soft	Guitars	Writer
1997	E! True Hollywood Story	Superstar	Guitars	Writer
1996	Lattjo Lajban	Blue Collar	Guitars	Writer
2003	Gossip Se Her	Pendulum	Guitars	Writer
2007	Big Brother	Night Climber, Milk Toast, Haystack, Sawtooth	Guitars	Writer
2009	Biz Kid$	Peppermint Lane	Guitars	Writer
2010	That Metal Show	Pendulum, Caffeine	Guitars	Writer
2010	Gene Simmons Family Jewels	Night Climber, Pendulum, Haystack, Sawtooth	Guitars	Writer
2014	Bad Judge	Rise Above It	Guitars	Writer

== Discography ==
Artist albums

- 1991: TER – CZ Records – Songwriter, Guitar, Vocals
- 1993: Sweet Water – Atlantic Records – Songwriter, Guitar, Vocals
- 1995: Superfriends – East West/Elektra Records – Songwriter, Guitar, Vocals
- 1998: Second Coming – Capitol Records – Producer, String Arrangement, Songwriter, Guitar, Vocals
- 2005: Combustion - Guitar
- 2006: Ignition - Guitar
- 2010: Left For Dead – Songwriter, Producer, Guitar, Vocals
- 2013: Deep Deep Blue – Songwriter, Producer, Guitar, Vocals
- 2014: Screaming In The Wind – Songwriter, Guitar, Vocals
- 2015: Skin and Bones – Songwriter, Producer, Guitar, Vocals
- 2016: Live in Europe – Songwriter, Producer, Guitar, Vocals
- 2017: Summer Rain – Songwriter, Producer, Guitar, Vocals
- 2019: Simple Life – Songwriter, Producer, Guitar, Vocals
- 2020: Cosmic Radio – Songwriter, Producer, Guitar, Vocals
- 2023: Guitar Kingdom – Songwriter, Producer, Guitar, Vocals
- 2025: The Speed of Life – Songwriter, Producer, Guitar, Vocals
- 2026: Fire Horse - Songwriter, Producer, Guitar, Vocals

== Sources ==
- Dudley Taft at IMDb
- Dudley Taft on Allmusic
- IQ Beats
- Dudley Taft Signs Deal With MIG
- Left for Dead - Dudley Taft | Album | AllMusic
