= The Rumba Kings =

American band

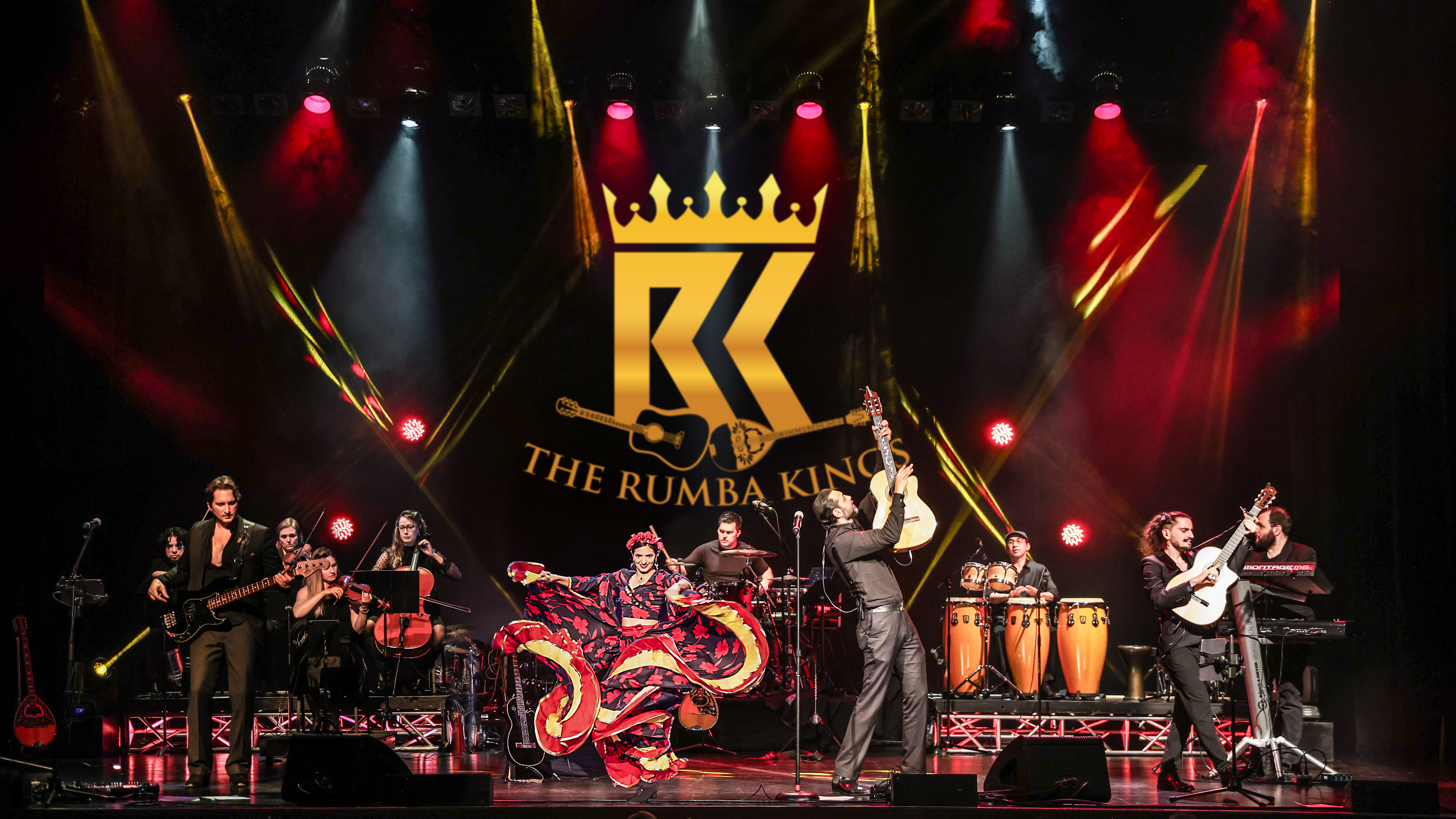
- Promo photo by Eric Morgensen

Background information
- Origin: Seattle, Washington, US
- Genres: Pop, Latin, World and Mediterranean
- Years active: 2015–present
- Label: The Rumba Kings Recordings
- Members: Johnny Bacolas; George Stevens
- Website: www.therumbakings.net

The Rumba Kings is an original American world music band co-founded in 2015 in Seattle, Washington, by producer/songwriter/bassist and former Capitol Records recording artist, Johnny Bacolas,(best known for being a member of the band Second Coming), and guitarist/songwriter, George Stevens. The songwriting is strongly influenced by Latin and Mediterranean music, and is mostly nylon-guitar driven, influenced by such artists as Yanni and The Gipsy Kings. Regarding the band's songs, Stevens states, "If it isn't beautiful, it doesn't make the cut," while Bacolas describes the band's music as "passionate and beautiful."

In 2018, the band released their debut double-album, The Instrumental and Vocal Sessions, Vol. I, and in 2019, released their sophomore full-length album, The Instrumental Sessions, Vol. II. Subsequently, the band released three singles in 2020.

== History (2015–present) ==
In June 2015, Bacolas and Stevens met through a mutual friend, quickly discovered a musical kinship and shared love of Latin and Mediterranean music, and formed The Rumba Kings. According to Bacolas in a 2023 interview with KBCS radio, "He whips out his iPhone and plays me a song that he wrote, beautiful song which is actually in our show now, I said, “You know we need to meet, we need to get together and share our ideas, and let me show you what I'm working on in my studio and show me what you're doing.” He came to my house the next day, literally the next day, and we played each other with the music we're doing and we started working that day (May 30, 2015) on what ended up being our debut double disc album, which had what, 21 songs on it something like that."

In the same interview with KBCS, Stevens explained, "When we first got together and this was kind of my vision of since I was a kid was to create a show that would take the audience on the tour around the Mediterranean, Eastern Europe, and just give them from all different angles, different elements of each region, and because I'm a lover of music, and for me to stick to one genre is very difficult. I need to have different influences."

Inspired by the rumba of the Mediterranean, the rich history of Latin music and the likes of Chico Bouchikhi and Nicolas Reyes of the Gipsy Kings, the Rumba Kings put their full efforts into working on their first album. Soon after, Bacolas and Stevens formed a live band from musicians they both knew. Bacolas and Stevens recruited several studio musicians to begin production on their debut album back in 2015. In April 2016, the group began performing live at local small bars and bistros.

In 2018, band released their debut double-disc debut album The Instrumental and Vocal Sessions, Vol. I. The album was produced by Johnny Bacolas and mixed and mastered by Martin Feveyear. The same year, Rumba Kings were tapped to play a slot at the annual Bellevue Blues and Jazz Festival as one of the headliners.

In 2019, the group released their sophomore full-length album, The Instrumental Sessions, Vol. II. The album was also produced by Johnny Bacolas and mixed and mastered by Martin Feveyear.

During the production of both records, Bacolas traveled to Greece on two occasions, to record several musicians on songs for The Rumba Kings' albums, and to film and direct music videos for the band's new albums. Filming for the music videos took place on location on Mykonos, Santorini, and as well as throughout the mainland of Greece. In a November 1998 interview in The National Herald, Bacolas states, "My ultimate dream is to build a small villa in Santorini with a recording studio."

The group released their Latin single, "Mirame", written by Horacio Alcantar (Lyrics), and George Stevens (Music), and produced by Johnny Bacolas in January 2020. Natalis is the featured vocalist.

The Rumba Kings released their Greek single "Den tha se ksehaso", written by Sofi Alexandrou (Lyrics), George Stevens (Music), and John Paul Adams (Lyrics/Music), and produced by Johnny Bacolas in July 2020. Also in July 2020, the band released their Latin single "Dance With Me", written by Johnny Bacolas (Lyrics), and George Stevens (Music), and produced by Johnny Bacolas. Natalis is the featured vocalists on "Dance With Me."

During the pandemic of 2020, when live music was paused, the group released nine quarantine videos. During this time, Bacolas and Stevens redesigned their show, growing it from 90 minutes to almost three hours in length, adding several new songs, as well as instrumentalists. Working with composer Seth-May Patterson, Bacolas integrated one of the area’s top string quartets, Arcobelano Strings, into their live show experience.

During an interview with KNKX radio, Stevens said "We're really progressing with the show, revamping and adding a lot of new elements. This downtime that we've had really put everything in perspective as to what needed to be done and gave us the time to do that." In the same interview, Bacolas added "That's been our attitude from the outset of this, to turn lemons into lemonade and to utilize this time, since everybody was going to be at home. George and I put the entire show under a microscope. We added songs, auditioned several additional musicians, brought in new percussionists and three new vocalists, and spent a lot of time training other instrumentalists. It was a really good time for us, since everybody has a home studio and we were able to collaborate electronically. It ended up being a really positive thing."

The Rumba Kings released a single, “Love from Mykonos”, in 2022, with the Washington Blues Society Bluesletter saying "Exudes the Mediterranean and Latin backgrounds of the Rumba Kings. A perfect soundtrack for the moment and the inspiration for the supporting videos shot around Mykonos and Santorini." Bacolas recalled the inspiration for the music video he filmed and produced for "Love from Mykonos," "While sitting on a deck looking towards the west as the sun began to set over Mykonos, Greece, and the Aegean Sea. Mykonos is set off the southeast coast of Greece in the warm Aegean waters north of the Mediterranean Sea.” In February 2023, the band was profiled on a KING-TV news feature, and took part in opening season 9 for Band in Seattle, a KING-TV show that celebrates live performances.

On September 21, 2024, The Rumba Kings released the double-album titled, Whispers of Passion, which is a mix of instrumental and vocal music and Rumba Kings' seductive and mediterranean sound. Bruce McCaw is credited as the executive producer and Johnny Bacolas is credited as the producer.

== Musicians that perform and record with The Rumba Kings ==
- George Stevens – guitar
- Johnny Bacolas – producer, bass guitar, guitar, bouzouki
- Teddy Adams – guitar
- Vinnie Uanno – guitar
- Mohamed Hussein – guitar
- Andrey Zasypkin/Mike Fernandez/Josh Kossak/Christos Manolopoulos – drums
- Sofi Alexandrou, Natalis, Rustam Shtar – vocals
- Rustam Shtar – Soprano Saxophone
- Bahaa Sadak/Achilleas Dantilis – keyboards
- Tor Dietrichson/
- Rachel Nesvig – violin
- Arcobaleno Strings – String Quartet
- Panagiotis Kotsianos – violin
- Geoffrey Castle – violin
- Brian Gunter – cello
- Enrique Haneo – guitar
- Eric Snyder – composer, guitar
- Seth May-Patterson – viola/arranger
- Loren Tempkin – piano
- Martin Ross – piano
- Charly Hernandez
- Deseo Carmin
- José Rioseco – guitar
- Camila Ugarte - vocals
- Elizabeth Proios - vocals

== Discography ==
Studio albums

Year	Album details
2018	The Instrumental and Vocal Sessions, Vol I: Released: February 17, 2018; Label: The Rumba Kings Recordings
2019	The Instrumental Sessions, Vol II: Released: June 1, 2019; Label: The Rumba Kings Recordings
2024	Whispers of Passion: Released: September 21, 2024; Label: The Rumba Kings Recordings

Singles

Year	Singles details
2020	Mirame feat. Natalis: Released: 2020; Label: The Rumba Kings Recordings
2020	Den Tha Se Ksehaso feat. Sofi Alexandrou: Released: 2020; Label: The Rumba Kings Recordings
2020	Dance With Me feat. Natalis: Released: 2020; Label: The Rumba Kings Recordings
2022	Love from Mykonos: Released: 2022; Label: The Rumba Kings Recordings
