= Second Coming (Second Coming album) =

Studio album by Second Coming
- Released: September 22, 1998
- Recorded: 1997–1998
- Studio: Robert Lang (Shoreline, Washington); Bob's Garage (Seattle, Washington); London Bridge (Seattle, Washington); Triple D Studios
- Genre: Alternative rock, alternative metal
- Length: 55:38
- Label: Timestyle Records; Capitol
- Producer: Kelly Gray and Dudley Taft

Second Coming chronology
L.O.V.Evil (1994)	Second Coming (1998)	13 (2003)

Singles from Second Coming
- 1. "Soft/Unknown Rider" Released: 1998; 2. "Vintage Eyes" Released: 1998

Second Coming is the second studio album by American rock band Second Coming. It was originally released independently with eight tracks through their own label, Timestyle, and later reissued and re-released with three additional tracks – "Tonight [The Goodnight King]", "The War", and "Unknown Rider" – on September 22, 1998, through Capitol Records. It is the first Second Coming album to feature vocalist Travis Bracht, who became their permanent singer until the band broke up in 2008, and the only one to feature guitarist Dudley Taft.

== Background and recording ==
Before joining drummer James Bergstrom and bassist Johnny Bacolas, the only two band members on this album who were also involved with its predecessor L.O.V.Evil, guitarist Dudley Taft enjoyed moderate success with the band Sweet Water; he appeared on their first two albums Ter and Sweet Water. Meanwhile, vocalist Travis Bracht sang in a band called Peace and Silence, which recorded and released one album called Fathom That.

To raise funds for this album, Second Coming moonlighted as a cover band called FTA, an acronym for "Funding the Album". Initially, they independently recorded an eight-track album that would later be reissued by Capitol Records with three additional tracks. Bacolas said, "We had already been done with our album for two months when we were signed by Capitol, and we were going to do our own distribution, so the deal was like an added bonus."

"This has all happened really quickly," summed Taft, who co-produced the album with Kelly Gray. "We wanted to record a short CD to put out ourselves and see what happens, hoping it would get us to the next place. The more things happen, the more we realize maybe these are the songs to make something happen… That's what everyone around us seems to be thinking."

== Music and lyrics ==
Bracht is credited for writing all the lyrics off Second Coming with the exception of "Vintage Eyes", which is credited to Taft. Taft is credited for writing or co-writing all the music off this album except for "Travisty", an apparent personal song written by Bracht (the title is a play on his first name) about the time he spent growing up in the foster care system in his teenage years.

"That song took me six months to write, I tore my legs off trying to make everything count, not wasting any lines," Bracht said of the song. "Writing that song was the classic scene of a writer surrounded himself with crumpled papers, throwing everything away and starting over in the middle of a room full of garbage. It's the first song I've ever written entirely by myself. It was the hardest thing I've ever done, but that's my fucking song. It's the closest thing to having a child, it means a lot."

== Critical reception ==
Professional ratings
Review scores
Source	Rating
Allmusic	3/5 stars
Amazon.com	(Favorable)
Maximum Ink	(Favorable)

Greg Parto of Allmusic described the music on Second Coming as having "mammoth guitar riffs, classic rock vocals, hefty drumming, and a touch of experimentalism thrown in from time to time." Janiss Garza wrote, "In spite of occasional pretension and high dramatics on "The War" and "The Song" (in addition to an obvious affection for generic song titles), Second Coming still manage, through pure muscle, to bring grunge up to date."

"Second Coming is a swaggering epic that obliterates the lines between their hometown's trademarked grunge sound, and the classic rock backgrounds that make them one of hard rock's brightest prospects," writes Paul Gargano of Maximum Ink. "When all is said and done, the 11-cut debut boldly and intelligently surges them ahead of their musical peers."

== Track listing ==
All lyrics by Travis Bracht, except where noted. All music by Dudley Taft, except where noted.

No.	Title	Lyrics	Music	Length
1.	"Confessional"			7:09
2.	"Soft" (Track 6 on original release)			4:11
3.	"Vintage Eyes" (Track 2 on original release)	Taft		4:17
4.	"Electric Head" (Track 3 on original release)			4:12
5.	"Travisty" (Track 4 on original release)		Bracht	6:28
6.	"The Song" (Track 5 on original release)			5:32
7.	"Tonight [The Goodnight King]"			4:35
8.	"Free" (Track 7 on original release)			3:44
9.	"The War"			4:12
10.	"Unknown Rider"		Taft/Bracht	5:05
11.	"Afilotimi" (Track 8 on original release)			5:58

== Personnel ==
The album's credits and personnel can be obtained from the liner notes.

Second Coming

- Johnny Bacolas — bass guitar
- James Bergstrom — drums
- Travis Bracht — vocals, rhythm guitar
- Dudley Taft — guitar, keyboard, string arrangements

Additional musicians

- Simon James, Linda Anderson, Vince Comer, and Craig Weaver — string quartet

Production

- Produced by Kelly Gray and Dudley Taft
- Mixed and engineered by Kelly Gray
- Mastered by Eddy Schreyer and Gene Grimaldi
- A&R by Steve Patch
- Art direction by Second Coming and Tommy Steele
- Design by P.R. Brown/Bau-Da Design Lab, Inc.
- Cover illustration by Jonathan Barkat
- Photography by Frank Ockenfels

Management

- Managed by Mike Renault and Bud Prager
- Legal representation by Kim Guggenheim, Tim Davis, Linda Benjamin, Keith Petrack, Brad Keller and Peter Tucker
