= Fire ant (disambiguation) =

Fire ant is the common name for several species of ants in the genus Solenopsis including the species:

- Red imported fire ant
- Black imported fire ant
- Southern fire ant

Fire ant may also refer to:

- European fire ant
- Electric ant, also known as "little fire ant"

== Other ==
- Orange Cassidy, an American professional wrestler who performed as "Fire Ant" in the Chikara wrestling promotion
- The Fire Ants, a 1990s supergroup signed to Dekema Records
- "Fire Ant" (Space Ghost Coast to Coast), a television episode
