= Shorewood High School (Washington) =

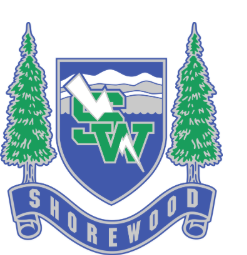

Location
- 17300 Fremont Avenue North; Shoreline, WA 98133 USA; 47°45′17″N 122°21′00″W

Information
- Type: Public
- Established: 1975
- Principal: Bill Dunbar
- Teaching staff: 68.17 (FTE)
- Enrollment: 1,555 (2023–2024)
- Student to teacher ratio: 22.81
- Colors: Blue, Green, White
- Mascot: Sammy the Stormray
- Team name: Stormrays
- Website: shorewood.ssd412.org
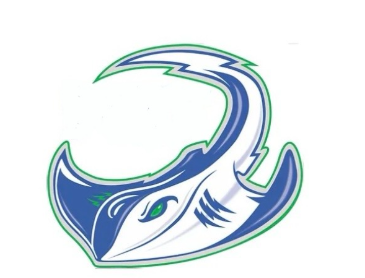

Shorewood High School is one of two public high schools in the Shoreline School District in Shoreline, Washington, United States. The school originally opened in 1975 and is the largest high school in the district. It serves students in grades nine through twelve. Shorewood accepts students west of Interstate 5 (I-5), and is fed students from Einstein Middle School and local private schools. As of 2014, approximately 53% of students are White and 47% are visible minorities. The school mascot is the Stormray, chosen in 2021 to replace the Thunderbird after the decision to retire that mascot in an effort to be more respectful of Native Americans.

== Facility and history ==
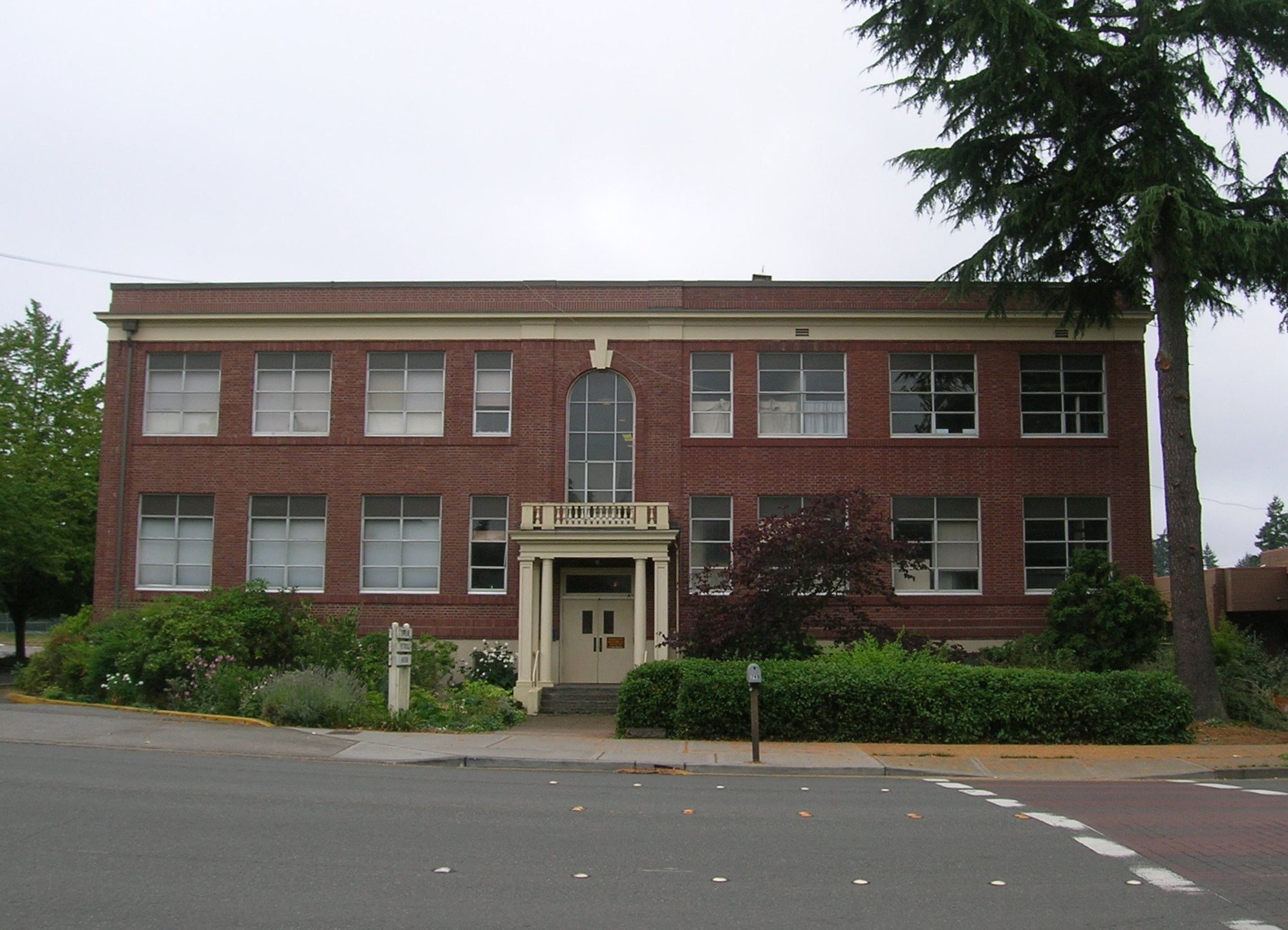
The historic Ronald Grade School wing, now used as the orchestra and choir rooms.

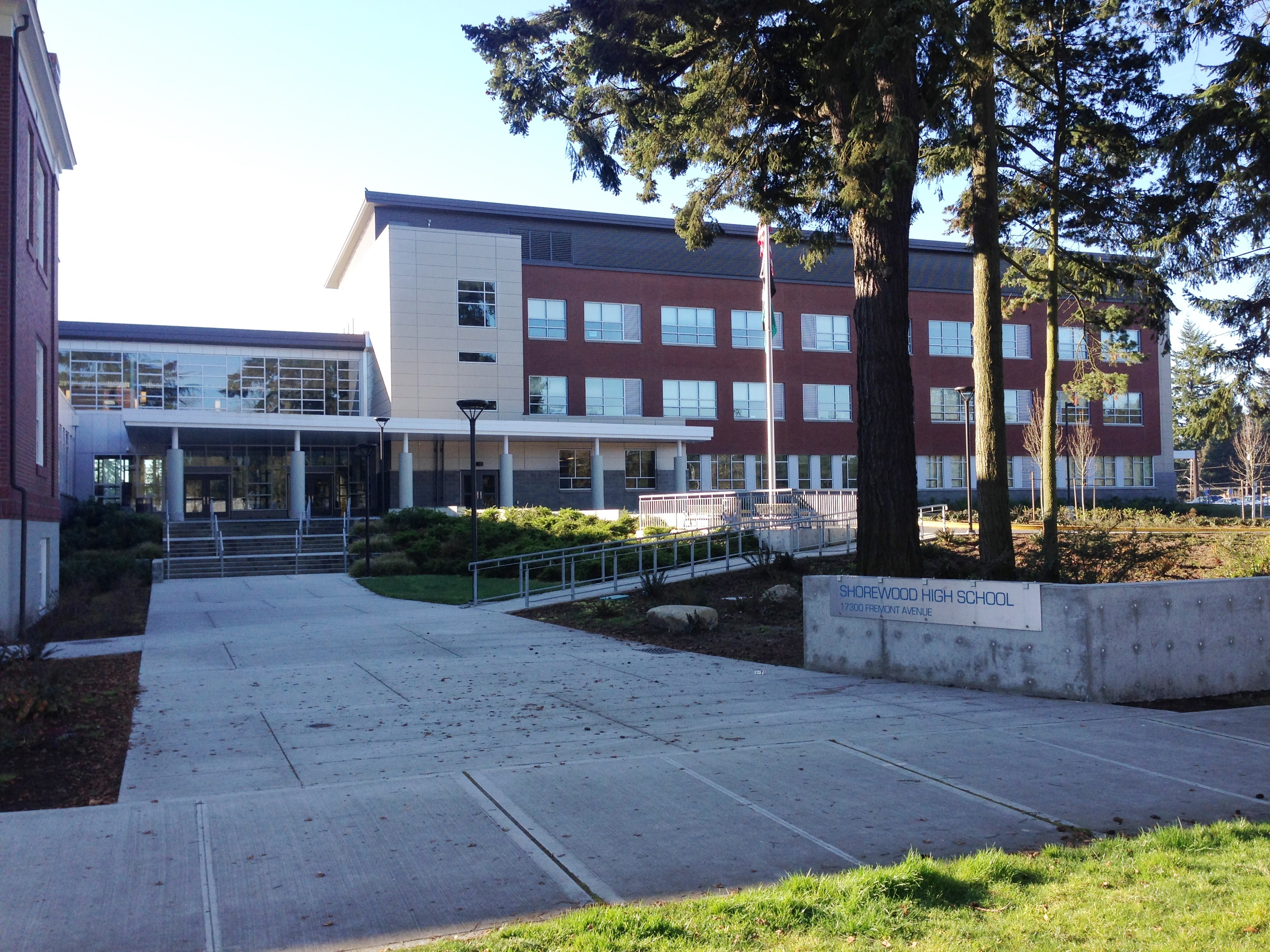
The newly added 2013 entry located on N 175th St

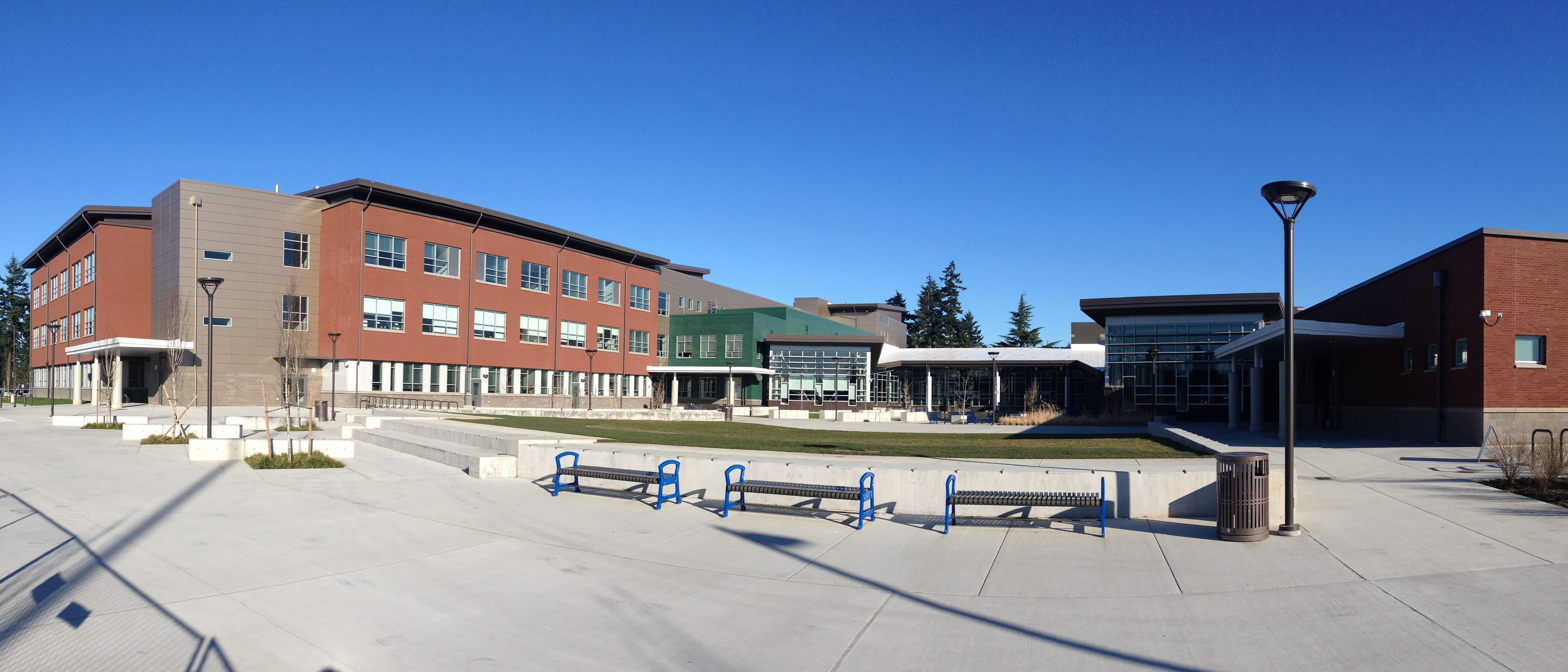
Panoramic view of the newly added 2013 south courtyard

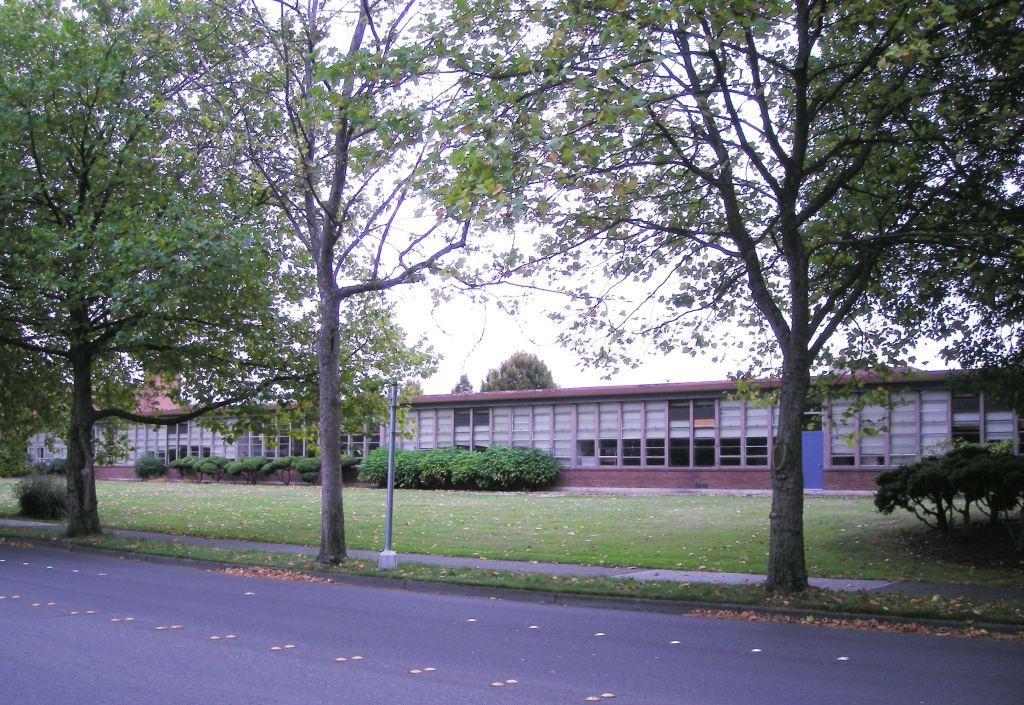
1950s-era classroom wing (demolished 2012)

Shorewood High School's original facility, built in 1975, spanned five city blocks. It had eight single-floor buildings with open outdoor corridors. The 1975 building was built in sections: the 100s building, closest to N. 175th Street was originally the Ronald Grade School built in 1906 and closed in 1971 due to a failed levy. The building was then used as a museum until 2010, after which it was reincorporated into the high school in 2013.

Along with the elementary school being closed, five other schools were closed, including Butler Junior High School, an older school originally built in 1953 and closed in 1973 to be rebuilt and become the main campus for the new High School named Shorewood. The students still in 7th or 8th grade at the time of the closure were sent to either Einstein Junior High School, or Cordell Hull Junior High School, with a few going to Kellogg Junior High School. None of these schools was a "middle" school at that time. Shorewood was to be the first 4-year high school. Upon its opening, only the 9th and 10th graders were brought in. That 10th grade class remained the eldest class at Shorewood until their graduation in the summer of 1978. It was a unique situation for that one class of students as they never had to face upperclassmen. During this transition period for the district, all of the remaining junior high schools became middle schools. Many of the last class of 7th grade students to enter Butler Junior High School were in the very first graduating class of Shorewood High School in 1978.

Shorewood High School underwent a 6.5 million dollar renovation in 1997.

In 2011 the school district approved plans to replace the school building with a new facility on the same site. The renovation and incorporation of the historic Ronald School building was approved by the Association of King County Historical Organizations. The ground-breaking ceremony for the new construction was held on October 17, 2011. The historic building was incorporated into the design as part of the new school's performing arts department and the remainder of the existing buildings were demolished. Architects for the new school were Bassetti Architects. The new 220,000 square foot facility opened on time in September 2013 for the 2013-14 school year.

== Academics and programs ==
Shorewood has 23 AP classes, covering 9 different subjects. In addition to AP courses, Shorewood offers a program called Running Start . This allows students to simultaneously acquire college and high school credit by taking classes at Shoreline Community College. In turn, many students graduate each year with an Associate's Degree. With an 86% on time graduation date Shorewood academics are well above the state [SBAC] average, scoring an 89% on reading, 91% on writing, 66% on math and 45% on science, with at least 60% of students passing the three state standards (Math, Writing and Reading) in the 2006 school year.

Eight Shorewood seniors were named National Merit finalists in the 2005-2006 academic year, two were named in the 2006-2007 academic year, and seven were named in the 2007-2008 academic year. In 2006, an Intel Science Talent Search Finalist, Jolene Mork, was from Shorewood. Approximately 12% of students took one or more AP exams in 2003. On average 59% of Shorewood graduates enrolled in 4-year colleges, and 28% enrolled in 2-year colleges, based on the graduating class of 2004-2005.

Shorewood participates in a school Chromebook program, as of the 2018-2019, which allows students the use of a Lenovo Chromebook for the completion of school work. The program is run by the school district.

== Athletics ==
Shorewood competes in Washington Interscholastic Activities Association Class 3A and is a member of the Wesco League in District One.

=== State championships ===
- Girls’ basketball: 1998
- Boys’ soccer: 1978
- Girls’ soccer: 1999
- Boys’ swimming: 2010
- Boys’ tennis: 1987, 2026
- Boys' track and field: 2026
- Volleyball: 1978

=== Rivalry ===
Shorewood’s main rival is Shorecrest High School, the other high school in the Shoreline School District. The schools compete annually in the Rotary Cup, a long-standing football rivalry held at Shoreline Stadium. The rivalry also extends to other major sports throughout the school year.

== Notable alumni ==
- Riley O'Brien (2013), MLB pitcher (St. Louis Cardinals)
- David Bazan (1994), songwriter
- Brian Glenney (1993), artist
- Sig Hansen (1984), captain, F/V Northwestern (featured on Deadliest Catch)
- Amy Holmes (1990), columnist, commentator
- David Raleigh (1978), singer, songwriter, piano player
- Damien Jurado (1992), songwriter
- Garth Stein (1983), author, film producer
- Jill Filipovic (2001), attorney and feminist author
- Kelly Stephens (2001), member of the U.S. Olympic Ice Hockey team, 2006
- Chris Cornell, Grunge pioneer, Soundgarden, Audioslave and Temple of the Dog vocalist; also successful solo artist (dropped out)
- James Bergstrom (1987), drummer for Alice N' Chains and Second Coming
- Johnny Bacolas (1987), bassist for Alice N' Chains and Second Coming
- George John (2005), MLS soccer player (FC Dallas)
- Blake Snell (2011), MLB pitcher (Los Angeles Dodgers), 2025 World Series champion, winner of the 2018 and 2023 Cy Young award and a 2018 All Star selection
- Josh Hawkinson (2013), Japanese professional basketball player for Sun Rockers Shibuya and 2024 Japanese Olympic Basketball team
- Jay Won (2018), professional Overwatch player, (San Francisco Shock), 2019 Overwatch League MVP
