= Soulbender (album) =

Studio album by Soulbender
- Released: May 22, 2004
- Recorded: 2003 / 2014
- Genre: Heavy metal
- Length: 48:58
- Label: Licking Lava Records; Rat Pak Records
- Producer: Eric Janko and Soulbender

Soulbender is the only studio album by the American-Canadian metal band of the same name. Originally released in 2004, it was re-released with additional recordings in 2014.

== Background and recording ==
Soulbender features Michael Wilton, founding guitarist of Queensrÿche, and Nick Pollock, former vocalist of My Sister's Machine. The album was recorded at three different studios in Washington: Triad (drums and bass), which also mixed the album, Watershed (guitars), and Slow Time (vocals). This album was co-produced by the band themselves and engineer Eric Janko. It was mastered by Eddy Schreyer, who has worked with artists such as Alice in Chains and Slipknot.

== Release and reception ==
Professional ratings
Review scores
Source	Rating
Blabbermouth.net	7.5/10
Jukebox Metal (Soulbender II)	3.5/5 stars
Melodic (Soulbender)	3/5 stars
Metal Temple (Soulbender II)	7/10

The album was independently released through Licking Lava Records on May 22, 2004. Steve Newton of The Georgia Straight has described the music on this album being "a tad darker than either of those bands (Queensrÿche and My Sister's Machine) are noted for." Sefany Jones, a contributing editor of KNAC, listed the album among her Top 15 albums of 2004; it came in at Number Two.

=== Rerelease ===
In 2014, Blabbermouth.net reported that the band were planning to release Soulbender II, containing four new songs and remasters of all tracks on Soulbender, through Rat Pak Records. The album also included updated cover art. Tony Sison of The Dedicated Rocker Society hailed Soulbender II as a "balls to the wall recording from start to finish."

== Track listing ==
All tracks written by Soulbender.

No.	Title	Length
1.	"Fix Me"	4:40
2.	"Clockwork and Compass"	3:34
3.	"Rabbit Hole"	4:32
4.	"The American Dream"	6:43
5.	"Samsara"	3:06
6.	"Prime Time"	3:24
7.	"Shoot Poem"	6:20
8.	"This Ocean"	4:07
9.	"Hunger"	5:33
10.	"Three Towers"	6:59

Soulbender II bonus tracks
No.	Title	Length
1.	"Turn Anger Up"	3:27
2.	"Shoal"	6:31
3.	"Slave To Reality"	3:35
4.	"Seraphim"	6:36

== Personnel ==
Soulbender

- Dave Groves – guitar
- Wes Hallam – drums
- Nick Pollock – vocals, design, layout
- Marten Van Keith – bass guitar
- Michael Wilton – guitar

Additional personnel and production

- Eric Janko – Producer
- Eddy Schreyer – Mastering
- Emma Burke, Sofie Dissel, Toshiko Okumura – Spoken vocals
- Jeremy Cranford, Corey D. Macourek, Scott Norris, Robert Raper – Design and layout

== See also ==
- 2004 in music
- Queensrÿche
