= 13 (Second Coming album) =

Studio album by Second Coming
- Released: February 10, 2003
- Genres: Alternative rock, alternative metal
- Length: 50:58
- Label: Timestyle Music

Second Coming chronology
Second Coming (1998)	13 (2003)

Acoustic cover
- Cover of the companion Acoustic EP

13 is the third and final studio album by American rock band Second Coming, and the only one to feature guitarist Eric Snyder. Before releasing 13, the band put out a companion acoustic EP featuring five of the tracks.

== Track listing ==
All tracks written by Bacolas, Bergstrom, Bracht and Snyder, except where noted.

No.	Title	Writer(s)	Length
1.	"Heaven (Is a Loaded Gun)"		5:01
2.	"Screamin' on the Inside" (Track 2 on Acoustic)	Bacolas, Bergstrom, Snyder	3:09
3.	"H-Bomb"		3:49
4.	"Drop Dead Fred"		3:14
5.	"Thank You" (Track 3 on Acoustic)		3:43
6.	"Devil Boy" (Track 1 on Acoustic)		5:00
7.	"Young Killers"		2:52
8.	"When the Lights Go Down" (Track 4 on Acoustic)		4:10
9.	"Faces of Me"		4:13
10.	"The Evil in Man"		4:01
11.	"Ritalin"	Bacolas, Bergstrom, Bracht	4:30
12.	"Liberty Man" (Track 5 on Acoustic)		3:19
13.	"Charming Crash"		3:57
Total length:			50:58

== Personnel ==
Second Coming

- Johnny Bacolas — bass guitar
- James Bergstrom — drums
- Travis Bracht — vocals
- Eric Snyder — guitar

Production

- 13
  - Produced by Kelly Gray and Rob Daiker
  - Engineered by Rob Daiker and Dave Hillis
  - Design by Alex Hart
  - Photography – Scott Corl
- Acoustic
  - Produced by Second Coming and Shad Woodman
  - Engineered and mixed by Shad Woodman
  - Design by Alex Hart and Scott Corl
