= Soulbender =

American-Canadian hard rock band

- Founding members Dave Groves, Wes Hallam, Nick Pollock, and Michael Wilton

Background information
- Origin: Seattle, Washington, U.S.
- Genres: Alternative metal, hard rock
- Years active: 2002–2014 (on hiatus)
- Labels: Licking Lava; Rat Pak
- Past members: See: Members

Soulbender is an American-Canadian hard rock band formed in Seattle, Washington, in 2002. The band independently released their album Soulbender in 2004, which they reissued with four additional tracks through Rat Pak Records under the title Soulbender II in 2014. Though the band underwent multiple lineup changes in that ten-year timespan, both releases featured the original five-piece incarnation of two Americans and three Canadians who previously played in several different bands respectively from Seattle and Vancouver: vocalist Nick Pollock (Alice N' Chains/My Sister's Machine), guitarist Michael Wilton (Queensrÿche), guitarist Dave Groves (Tin Pan/Fallen Angel), drummer Wes Hallam (Assault/Fallen Angel), and bassist Marten Van Keith (Thor).

== History ==
Soulbender has chiefly been noted as a side-project of Michael Wilton, borne out of his desire to return the heavy metal sound that his main band Queensrÿche had drifted away from. After completing 17 original tracks, Soulbender played their first live show opening for Queensrÿche vocalist Geoff Tate's solo band at the Experience Music Project in Seattle on June 22, 2002. They also performed at the very first Layne Staley Tribute later that August.

With the addition of bass player Marten Van Keith, who also hailed from Vancouver according to Wilton, the group released their self-titled debut album through Licking Lava Records in 2004 and they immediately began to tour in support of the album. Prior to the release of the album, Sefany Jones of KNAC was given a demo CD of six songs. In her review, she wrote, "The overall feel of this album is entrancing, inasmuch as I would describe Tool." She also likened it to Marilyn Manson, Alice in Chains, and Michael Monroe. Wilton said in an interview a year later that "a lot of people are apparently comparing it to Alice in Chains and Tool." Despite playing a couple sellout shows, the band has experienced much difficulty getting off the ground due to Wilton's Queensrÿche duties. Wilton compared this predicament to that of singer Maynard James Keenan, who pulls double duty with Tool and A Perfect Circle, saying "I'll do a little tour here with one band and a little tour there with the other band." Van Keith was replaced in 2005 by bass player Chuck Miller, formerly of the band Peace and Silence.

In 2007, Pollock and Hallam stepped down from their respective roles as vocalist and drummer and replaced by Travis Bracht of Second Coming and for a brief spell Van Williams of Nevermore. Bracht had previously worked with Chuck Miller in Peace and Silence. Later that year, Ray Hartman replaced Van Williams on drums and Soulbender released a song called "Loaded" on Unleashed 3, a compilation album of songs by various artists from Rat Pak Records. They also performed at the sixth annual Layne Staley Tribute along with Daughtry in 2007.

In 2008 and 2009, Wilton said he was "six songs into" finishing a second album. By this time, he said that Tim "Ripper" Owens had assumed vocal duties. In 2011, Wilton said, "I actually have 75% of the Soulbender 2 written so it will get finished I just don’t know when."

In 2014, the original members of Soulbender reunited and signed a world-wide distribution deal with Rat Pak Records. On September 30, 2014, they released Soulbender II, a remastered version of their original album with four new songs.

In 2018, a GoFundMe campaign was set up for Marten Van Keith after he was diagnosed with throat cancer. On January 13, 2020, Queensrÿche announced on their Facebook page that Van Keith had died from the cancer.

== Members ==
Last line-up

- Michael Wilton – guitar
- Dave Groves – guitar
- Nick Pollock – vocals
- Wes Hallam – drums
- Marten Van Keith – bass guitar (died 2020)

Former members

- Chuck Miller – bass guitar
- Ray Hartman – drums
- Tim "Ripper" Owens – vocals
- Travis Bracht – vocals

Touring members

- Van Williams – drums

== Discography ==
Studio albums

- Soulbender (2004)

Other appearances

Year	Song	Title	Label	Notes
2007	"Loaded"	Unleashed 3	Rat Pak Records	Travis Bracht sings on "Loaded".
2008	"Three Towers"	Unleashed 4	Rat Pak Records	Taken from debut album.
2009	"Clockwork and Compass"	Unleashed 5	Rat Pak Records	Taken from debut album.
2014	"Turn Anger Up"	Soulbender II	Rat Pak Records	Original Lineup with Michael Wilton, Nick Pollock, Dave Groves, Wes Hallam, Marten Van Keith
2014	"Seraphim"	Soulbender II	Rat Pak Records	Original Lineup with Michael Wilton, Nick Pollock, Dave Groves, Wes Hallam, Marten Van Keith
2014	"Shoal"	Soulbender II	Rat Pak Records	Original Lineup with Michael Wilton, Nick Pollock, Dave Groves, Wes Hallam, Marten Van Keith
2014	"Slave to Reality"	Soulbender II	Rat Pak Records	Original Lineup with Michael Wilton, Nick Pollock, Dave Groves, Wes Hallam, Marten Van Keith
