= Shoreline School District =

School district in Shoreline, Washington

Address
- 18560 1st Ave NE Shoreline, Washington, 98155; United States
- Coordinates: 47°45′53″N 122°19′43″W

District information
- Type: Public
- Motto: Shore to Shore, Line to Line (unofficial)
- Grades: Pre-K through High school
- Established: 1944; 82 years ago
- Superintendent: Dr. Susana Reyes
- Budget: $154,952,663
- NCES District ID: 5307920

Students and staff
- Students: 9,522 (2020–2021)
- Staff: 1,019
- Student–teacher ratio: 19.74

Other information
- Mission statement: The mission of Shoreline Public Schools is to provide a collaborative learning community which engages all students in learning the academic and work-life skills needed to achieve their individual potential and become responsible citizens.
- Website: www.ssd412.org

The Shoreline School District (No. 412) is a public school district in King County, Washington, United States of America, which serves the cities of Shoreline and Lake Forest Park. It currently enrolls 9,456 students, and staffs 1,019 employees as of the 2020–2021 school year. It is located right on the boundary between King County and Snohomish County.

The District currently controls 15 schools; 1 Early Learning Center, 9 elementary schools, 1 K–8 STEM school, 2 middle schools and 2 high schools, Shorecrest and Shorewood. Former school buildings have been reused for many tasks, with the original Shoreline High School being repurposed for City of Shoreline endeavors as well as District offices. North City Elementary has been reused temporarily as Parkwood Elementary was in the process of being remodeled, and North City has also been used as a testing facility.

Following Rebecca Miner's resignation, on July 1, 2021, Dr. Susana Reyes became Superintendent of the Shoreline School District, after a five-month search.

== Budget ==
The Superintendent of the Shoreline School District makes $316,504, the sixth highest salary in the state of Washington, beating out districts like Bellevue School District which enrolls double the number of students.

The 2020–2021 school year General Fund Budget was $154,952,663.

== Demographics ==
The 65,000-member communities are predominantly middle-class with a high percentage of college graduates and professional people. The district's 9,560 student population is 8.3% African American, 0.6% Native Hawaiian, 13.1% Asian, 0.3% Native American, 13.8% Hispanic, and 51.5% Caucasian.

Parental involvement is high with a Parent Teacher Association that is one of the most active in the state. The district encourages parent participation at all levels.

== Construction ==
Shoreline has had strong support with bond and levy measures from the district's voters. In February 2010, voters approved a bond issue for the modernization/replacement of both Shorecrest and Shorewood High Schools. The new Shorewood High School opened in the fall of 2013. Shorecrest opened its new gymnasium in September 2012, the Performing Arts Building in early 2013, and the main academic building in early 2014.

In February 2017, voters approved a bond issue to rebuild Parkwood Elementary, and both middle schools. The new Parkwood opened in the fall of 2019. The new middle schools opened in the fall of 2020.

== Technology ==
With strong support from voters in approving the 2010 technology levy, Shoreline School District piloted an iPad program for students at Shorewood High School for the 2011–2012 school year with considerable success. For 2012–2013, the program was expanded to Shorecrest High School, and all students in grades 9 to 12 could've received an iPad for use both at school and at home.

As of the 2018–2019 school year, the high schools participate in a school Chromebook program, which allows students the use of a Lenovo Chromebook for the completion of schoolwork. The program is run by the school district.

== Schools ==
=== Early Learning ===
The Edwin T. Pratt Early Learning Center opened January 7, 2019, and offers preschool, special education, and after school care.

=== Elementary schools ===
All Shoreline elementary schools serve grades kindergarten through 5th grade.

School	Enrollment (approx.)	Mascot
Briarcrest	445	Bulldogs
Brookside	395	Bluejays
Echo Lake	405	Eagles
Highland Terrace	380	Orcas
Lake Forest Park	450	Dolphins
Meridian Park	495	Cheetahs
Parkwood	370	Panthers
Ridgecrest	435	Rams
Cascade K-8 Community School	210	Wolves
Syre	445	Wildcats

==== Closed elementary schools ====
North City Elementary School and Sunset Elementary School, each of which enrolled approximately 375 students, were closed at the end of the 2006–2007 school year. Several other elementary schools, originating from the Baby Boom era, closed during the 1970s and 1980s. Those schools include: Richmond Beach, Hillwood, Ronald, Aldercrest, Cedarbrook, Horizon View, Hamlin Park, Paramount Park, Cromwell Park, and Meridian.

=== Middle schools ===
- Einstein Middle School

Einstein is located on the west-side of the I-5 Freeway in Shoreline and enrolls approximately 1,100 students in grades 6 through 8 since the 2020–2021 school year. Most alumni attend Shorewood High School. Its mascots are Albert Einstein and the Tiger, originally the Indians.

- Kellogg Middle School

Kellogg is located on the east-side of the I-5 Freeway in Shoreline and enrolls approximately 1,000 students in grades 6 through 8 since the 2020–2021 school year. Most alumni attend Shorecrest High School. Its mascot is Dwight the Knight which was named after one of Kellogg’s famous alumni: Rainn Wilson, who played the character Dwight Schrute on the hit television show The Office. The current Kellogg campus was formerly known as Thomas Hunt Morgan Junior High School.

- Cascade K–8 Journey Program (grades 6–8)

Cascade K–8 is located at the Aldercrest Campus, shared by Cascade K–8 and the Home Education Extension (HEE). The middle school at Cascade K–8 is home to the STEAM (Science, Technology, Engineering, Arts, and Mathematics) program. Cascade K–8's mascot is the wolf.

Closed middle schools/junior highs are Cordell Hull (converted to Meridian Park Elementary), Butler (converted into the original Shorewood High School), Thomas Hunt Morgan (converted to the second Kellogg Middle School) and the original Kellogg (relocated to the former Morgan site following an arson fire in 1982–1983).

=== High schools ===
- Shorecrest High School
- Shorewood High School

Closed high school

The first high school in Shoreline was Shoreline High. The school was opened in 1955 and closed in 1986. The school property is still used as the central office for the entire district and is host to Shoreline Stadium. The former high school was converted to community use after its closure and is home to the Shoreline-Lake Forest Park Senior Center, the Shoreline-Lake Forest Park Arts Council, and the Shoreline Chamber of Commerce.

Shoreline High School mascot – Spartans

Colors: blue and gold

There is a large display of Shoreline High School memorabilia in the Alumni Room at Shoreline Center.

=== Stadiums ===
Shoreline Stadium - shared between Shorecrest and Shorewood for football, soccer, and track events. It is best known as the site of the annual Rotary Cup rivalry football game between the Stormrays and Scots (sponsored by the Shoreline chapter of Rotary International). The stadium features a turf field, all-weather track, and a singular grandstand with seating for roughly 3,000 people.

== Other programs ==
- Children's Center
- Homeschool Education Exchange
- Highly Capable a.k.a Hi-Cap (advanced curriculum program in elementary schools)
