= Second Coming (band) =

American rock band (1990–2008)

- L-R: Johnny Bacolas, Travis Bracht, James Bergstrom, Eric Snyder

Background information
- Origin: Seattle, Washington, U.S.
- Genres: Alternative metal, post-grunge, hard rock, alternative rock
- Years active: 1990–2008
- Labels: Red Rocket, TimeStyle Music, Capitol
- Past members: Johnny Bacolas; James Bergstrom; Travis Bracht; Maxi (Jesse Holt); Junkeye (Ron Holt); Davis Martin; Eric Snyder; Stamatina; Dudley Taft

Second Coming was an American rock band formed in Los Angeles, California, in 1990. The band underwent several lineup changes throughout its existence with drummer James Bergstrom and bassist Johnny Bacolas ostensibly being the nucleus of the band, as they were the only members who appeared on every album. The two of them have been friends since childhood and they had also formed the rhythm section in an early incarnation of Alice in Chains that also consisted of vocalist Layne Staley and guitarist Nick Pollock; they called themselves Alice N' Chains.

The initial lineup of Second Coming consisted of drummer Bergstrom, bassist Ron "Junkeye" Holt, vocalist Jesse "Maxi" Holt, and keyboardist Stamatina. They relocated to Seattle, Washington, around 1992. Afterwards, Ron Holt was replaced on bass by Bacolas and Stamatina was replaced on keyboards by Davis Martin. Guitarist Mark Nelson also joined the band around the same time. They released their debut album L.O.V.Evil in 1994.

By 1996 however, Nelson, Martin, and Jesse Holt departed from the band. Bacolas and Bergstrom reemerged with a different lineup that included vocalist Travis Bracht from Peace and Silence and guitarist Dudley Taft from Sweet Water. In 1998, they released Second Coming, which garnered mainstream attention. In 2001, Taft quit the group and was replaced by guitarist Eric Snyder. Two years later, the group released a third album, 13.

== History ==
=== L.O.V.Evil (1994–1995) ===
In 1994 Second Coming independently released their debut CD L.O.V.Evil through Red Rocket Records. The album was produced by Maxi and all songs were written by Maxi except for "It's Coming After" (featuring Layne Staley) and "So Wired" written by Junkeye, and "The Great Big Burn" written by T-Roy and Maxi. Second Coming had several most-requested songs on Seattle radio station KISW, including "M.T. Your Gun," "It's Coming After," and "So Beautiful (And Everything)." There also was a music video for the song "Afraid of Love". Eventually, however, this lineup split into two parties fighting over the band name with Bacolas and Bergstrom winning out in the end.

=== Second Coming (1996–2000) ===
In 1996, Johnny Bacolas and James Bergstrom formed a different version of Second Coming with guitarist Dudley Taft and vocalist Travis Bracht, adopting a heavier sound and immediately began work on their next album. To raise funds for this album, Second Coming moonlighted as a cover band called FTA (Funding the Album). Two years later, they independently released their eponymous album Second Coming, which was later reissued with three additional tracks by Capitol Records after the band signed an exclusive recording contract with them on May 8, 1998, after a vigorous bidding war. Gary Gersh, who was involved in the careers of Nirvana and Foo Fighters, was the president of Capitol Records at the time of the band's signing, and played an important role in signing Second Coming to Capitol. Gersh said of the band after they signed to Capitol, "I think they have a good idea of who they are in the marketplace, where they can fit in and what their strengths are. I think they know what it's going to take to succeed." The band toured heavily with such as acts as Godsmack, Kid Rock, Lenny Kravitz, VAST, Candlebox, Fuel, and Monster Magnet.

=== 13 and Acoustic (2000–2007) ===
The band parted ways with Capitol Records in 2001, not long after President Gary Gersh, who personally signed Second Coming, parted from the label. In 2001 Dudley Taft quit the group. In a March 2019 interview in Cincinnati Magazine, Taft states he quit the group due to inner-band squabbling, "We did some demos and then there was a bunch of inner squabbling, so I quit, which was the best thing I ever did," says Taft. In 2003 the band replaced Dudley Taft with guitarist Eric Snyder and once again began working independently on their next album.

In 2002, Layne Staley died after a long battle with drugs. A few months after this tragedy occurred, Second Coming headlined what would be the first annual tribute held in Staley's honor around his birthday in August. This first tribute also featured the band Soulbender whose vocalist at that time was former Alice N' Chains guitarist Nick Pollock.

In 2003, Second Coming released their third studio album 13 along with a companion EP Acoustic on their own label Timestyle Music and distributed both through their own website, iTunes and Amazon.com.

=== Final years and post-Second Coming (2007–present) ===
In 2007, Bracht began pulling double duty fronting both Second Coming and Soulbender after Nick Pollock stepped down from the latter. Meanwhile, Second Coming was also said to be working on another album that was due in 2007 but also has not been released.

In 2008, Bacolas and Snyder worked on another project called The Crying Spell, releasing an album titled Through Hell to Heaven. This band performed with Live vocalist Ed Kowalczyk at the 2009 Layne Staley Tribute Concert. As of 2012, Snyder is still with The Crying Spell, which has put out a second album Disgraceland, whilst Bacolas has left and joined another band called Lotus Crush, which put out an album in 2011 called Half Light Morning. In June 2015, Bacolas co-founded the group, The Rumba Kings, which has released several albums and singles beginning in 2018. Drummer James Bergstrom, and guitarist Eric Snyder, are credited musicians on The Rumba Kings' debut album.

In 2008, Guitarist Dudley Taft formed The Dudley Taft Band, which has released several albums.

In 2009, Travis Bracht formed another band called Post Modern Heroes along with almost every other member of his first band Peace and Silence, releasing their debut album Post Modern Heroes a year later. In February 2017, Bracht performed two shows with Second Coming after leaving the group in the late 2000s. In October 2016 Bracht's new Seattle-based band, Bruiser Brody, released an EP, followed-up by a full-length album in November 2018 titled, Everyone's Dead. In 2019, Bracht released a solo album titled, The Last Funeral.

In February 2017, Second Coming performed two shows in a small venue in Bellevue, Washington.

In 2019, Eric Snyder's new group, Locistellar, released its debut EP titled, Leading Era.

== Members ==
Final members

- James Bergstrom – drums (1990–2008)
- Johnny Bacolas – bass (1992–2008)
- Travis Bracht – vocals, guitars (1996–2008)
- Eric Snyder – guitars (2001–2008)

Former members

- Jesse "Maxi" Holt – vocals, guitars (1990–1996)
- Ron "Junkeye" Holt – bass, guitars, keyboards (1990–1992)
- Stamatina – keyboards (1990–1992)
- Davis Martin – keyboards, percussion (1992–1996)
- Mark Nelson – guitars (1992–1996)
- Dudley Taft – guitars (1996–2001)

== Discography ==
Studio albums

Year	Album details
1994	L.O.V.Evil: Released: June 16, 1994; Label: Red Rocket
1998	Second Coming: Released: September 22, 1998; Label: Capitol
2003	13: Released: February 10, 2003; Label: Timestyle

Extended plays

Year	Album details
2002	Acoustic EP: Released: 2002; Label: Timestyle

== Charted songs ==
Year	Title	Chart	Album
Year	Title	US Mainstream Rock	Album
1998	"Soft"	16	Second Coming
1999	"Vintage Eyes"	16	Second Coming
