= Alice N' Chains =

American glam metal band (1984–1987)

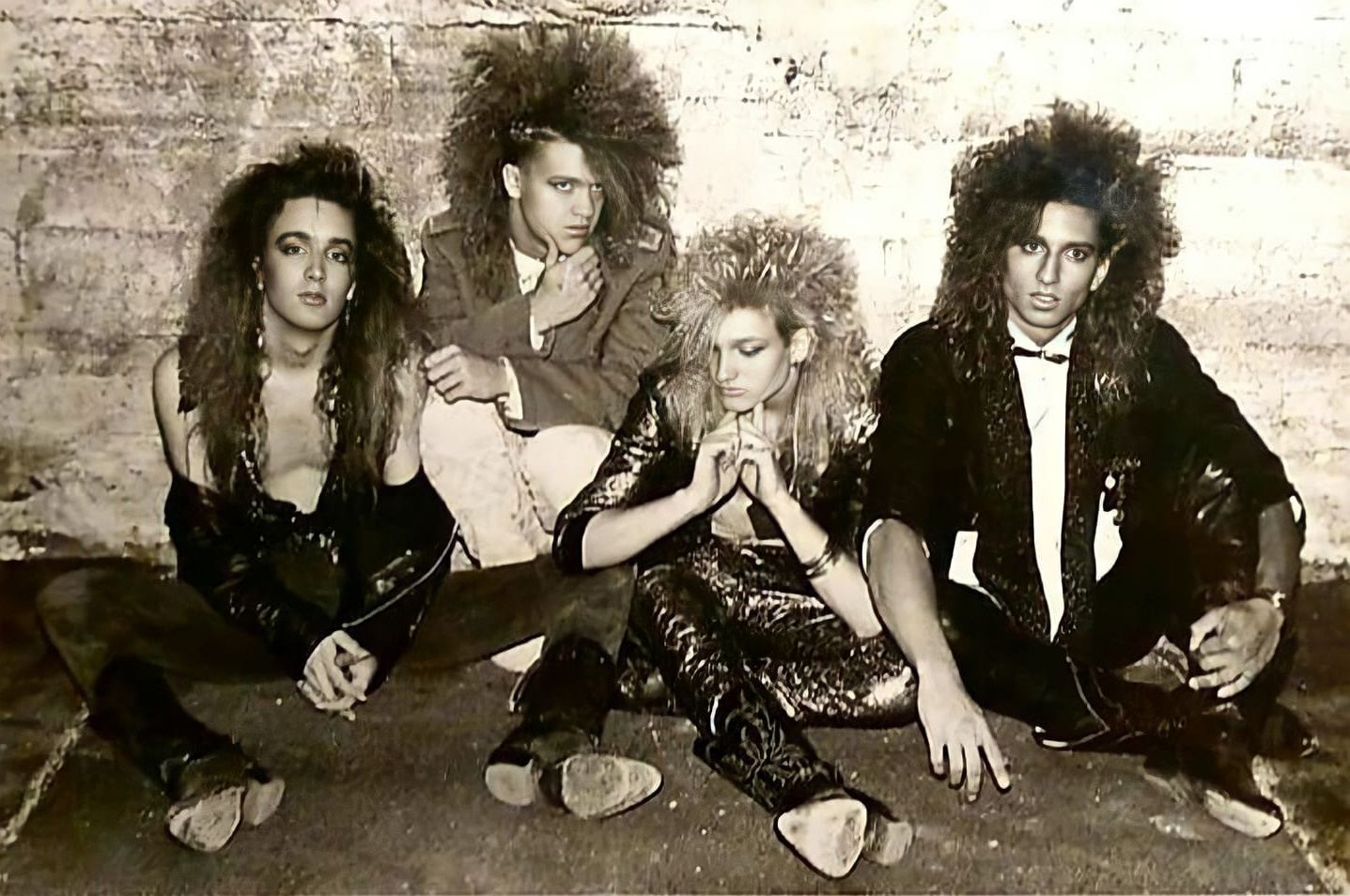
- 1987 promo photo, from left: Nick Pollock, James Bergstrom, Layne Staley, Johnny Bacolas

Background information
- Also known as: Sleze
- Origin: Shoreline, Washington, U.S.
- Genre: Glam metal
- Years active: 1984–1987
- Spinoffs: Alice in Chains • Second Coming
- Past members: Layne Staley; Johnny Bacolas; Ed Semanate; Byron Hansen; James Bergstrom; Chris Markham; Jim Sheppard; Nick Pollock; Mike Mitchell

Alice N' Chains (originally Sleze) was an American glam metal band from Shoreline, Washington, formed in 1984, who became known for being the first band Layne Staley sang for. Sleze went through several lineup changes before changing their name in 1986, and recording demos, with the lineup of Staley, guitarists Johnny Bacolas and Nick Pollock, bassist Mike Mitchell, and drummer James Bergstrom. The band broke up in 1987; a few months later, Staley formed the successful grunge band Alice in Chains.

== History ==
=== Early years ===
Alice N' Chains was originally formed under the name "Sleze" in 1984, by students at Shorewood High School, Shoreline, Washington. Guitarists Johnny Bacolas and Ed Semanate, bassist Byron Hansen, and drummer James Bergstrom, were without a singer, when Bergstrom was approached by Ken Elmer, a friend from the school's marching band. Elmer knew that Bergstrom and his bandmates were looking for a singer and suggested they audition his stepbrother Layne Staley, who at that time went by the name Layne Elmer. Ken said that Staley played the drums but "he wants to be a singer". Despite what Elmer told Bergstrom, Staley's mother Nancy McCallum has claimed her son was hesitant and said, "Well, I'm not a singer", but his stepbrother replied, "Why don't you try out anyhow?" Staley agreed and an audition took place at the Bergstrom residence, where the band had their jam room set up in the basement.

Johnny Bacolas has given various interviews recalling how he and the other instrumentalists "were just blown away" by Staley despite him being "really shy, real timid" as he looked down while he sang but "the grain of his voice was there, the soul was there". Bacolas and the other three instrumentalists – Bergstrom, Semanate, and Hansen – have all said they are fairly certain the first song they played with Staley was "Looks That Kill" by Mötley Crüe and it was at that moment they knew they were onto something.

"When he got to the part, 'Now she's a cool cool black,' he could actually hit those notes. We were like, 'Oh my God! This is awesome!'" Bergstrom recalls with a laugh. "So you had that feeling, 'Here's this kid. He's got a great sounding voice. He's cool. He could sing on key. And he also had good range and he was soulful, though he was just a raw beginner.' So we knew we had something special, and we were like in heaven from then, man. We became a band."

Semanate had a similar impression of Staley, adding, "He had a really high voice, kind of Vince Neil-ish, he could nail that pretty good. So I was happy." Bacolas also expressed his pleasure at finding Staley, saying, "Layne had his own thing, and I think that's what was the most appealing (thing) about him. He had a very distinctive voice. I didn't want another Morrison or another Rob Halford. We weren't looking for that. I don't know what we were looking for. We just kind of—we just found it."

On February 4, 1985, the band played live for the first time, performing a 45-minute lunchtime set at their school's Student Activity Center. Shortly after this, Semanate left the band, due to the other members' mothers being critical of his use of alcohol and marijuana. He was replaced by Chris Markham, who was briefly a member, before being replaced by Nick Pollock in late 1985. Hansen also left the band in fall of 1985, and was replaced by Jim Sheppard.

In a 1985 airing of the television program, Town Meeting, featured on KOMO 4 Seattle, Staley and Bacolas are in attendance in the studio audience to protest censorship from the PMRC (Parents Music Resource Center). Frank Zappa was the guest speaker in opposition of the PMRC. At one point during the program, the host, Ken Schram, gives Staley an opportunity to speak into the microphone and Staley makes the following statement, directed to one of the co-founders of the PMRC and guest speaker on the program, Sally Nevius, "I play for a rock band called Sleze, and there's enough controversy on our name, more or less than our songs. We just signed with a local record company. I don't feel there's anything objectionable about any of our songs, but I don't feel anyone anyone else has the right to rate our songs, I mean, I'm the only one that has the right to rate my album, you don't have it."

=== Recordings and name change ===
(Clockwise from top left) Nick Pollock, Johnny Bacolas, Layne Staley, James Bergstrom

In early 1986, the band began pre-production on their first demo with producer Tim Branom, the future singer of Fifth Angel. By this point, the band had replaced Sheppard with Mike Mitchell, and recorded at London Bridge Studio with the help of its founding engineers Rick and Raj Parashar. In January 1987, the band printed 100 copies of the demo, which they gave out to friends and fans.

Before the demo was printed, the band changed their name to Alice N' Chains. This stemmed from a conversation Bacolas had with Russ Klatt, the singer of another band called Slaughterhouse Five, about backstage passes.

[W]e were talking about different concepts for backstage passes. It would say, like, 'Sleze: The Welcome to Wonderland Tour.' That ended up turning into a discussion - we were talking about changing the band name. And we were saying, 'Alice in Wonderland? How about this, how about that? Maybe...Alice in Chains? We could put her in bondage stuff!' I liked the ring [of] 'Alice in Chains' - I remember I came back to the next band rehearsal and I told the guys. The issue was the reference to bondage, which our parents would not go for. Layne's mom was very hardcore Christian. So we ended up changing it to Alice 'N Chains, which made it more like Alice and Chains.

However, Staley's mother Nancy McCallum has said she still did not approve of this at first:

I had a sense of humor about the name Sleze. But when [Layne] came home and said they were changing the name to Alice 'N Chains, I was not happy. I said, 'Honey, that is female bondage. You don't want to choose a name like that - it's going to push your female audience away. I really feel strong about this.' He was adamant and I was adamant. For the first time in my life, I didn't have much of a conversation with him for about two weeks, because I was concerned, and also offended. How could my child possibly choose a name like 'Alice N' Chains?

Johnny Bacolas stated that the decision to use the N-apostrophe combination in their name had nothing to do with the Los Angeles band Guns N' Roses. The name change happened in 1986, a year before Guns N' Roses became a household name with their first album Appetite for Destruction, which was released in July 1987.

According to Staley, the reason they chose this name was because they wanted to dress in drag and play heavy metal as a joke.

=== Breakup and aftermath ===
After Alice N' Chains broke up, Staley joined a different group of musicians led by guitarist Jerry Cantrell that eventually took up the name Alice in Chains. This band rose to international fame as part of the grunge movement of the early 1990s, along with other Seattle bands such as Nirvana, Pearl Jam, and Soundgarden. He also formed the supergroup Mad Season along with Pearl Jam guitarist Mike McCready, Screaming Trees drummer Barrett Martin and bassist John Baker Saunders.

Bacolas and Bergstrom became members of the post-grunge band Second Coming, while Pollock formed the band My Sister's Machine, taking up mostly vocal duties as their primary lyricist. He later sang in the band Soulbender, which also featured Queensrÿche guitarist Michael Wilton.

Jim Sheppard played bass with Sanctuary, later forming Nevermore.

== Members ==
- Layne Staley – vocals (1984-1987)
- Johnny Bacolas – guitar, bass (1984-1987)
- Ed Semanate – guitar (1984-1985)
- Byron Hansen – bass (1984-1985)
- James Bergstrom – drums (1984-1987)
- Chris Markham - guitar (1985)
- Jim Sheppard- bass (1985-1986)
- Nick Pollock – guitar (1985-1987)
- Mike Mitchell – bass (1986-1987)

== Discography ==
=== Demo No. 1 track listing ===
1. "Lip Lock Rock" – 4:24
2. "Fat Girls" – 3:39
3. "Over the Edge" – 2:44

=== Demo No. 2 track listing ===
1. "Sealed with a Kiss" – 2:49
2. "Ya Yeah Ya" – 3:11
3. "Glamorous Girls" – 2:48
4. "Don't Be Satisfied" – 3:27
5. "Hush, Hush" – 2:29
6. "Football" – 2:01

== See also ==
- List of glam metal bands and artists
