= Johnny Bacolas =

American musician (born 1969)

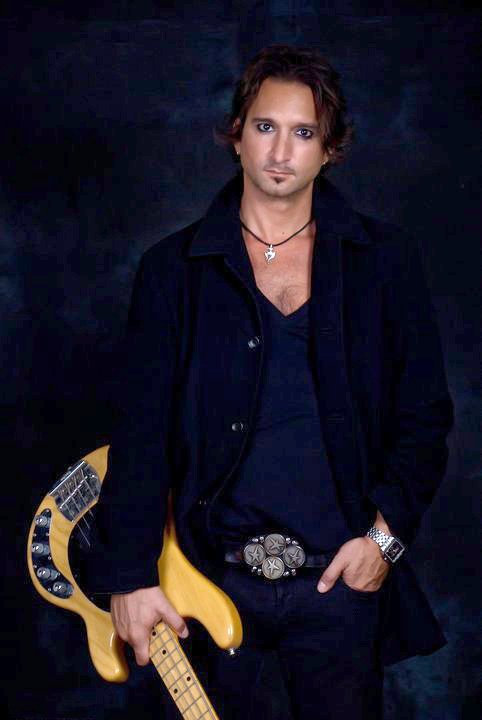
- Bacolas in 2010

Background information
- Born: Johnny Bacolas; March 3, 1969 (age 57); Seattle, Washington, U.S.
- Genres: Alternative rock, alternative metal, post-grunge, hard rock, glam metal (early)
- Occupations: Musician, record producer, songwriter
- Instruments: Bass guitar, guitar
- Years active: 1985–present
- Member of: The Rumba Kings
- Formerly of: Alice N' Chains; Second Coming; The Crying Spell; Lotus Crush; Owin' Soul
- Website: therumbakings.net

Johnny Bacolas (Greek: Ιωάννης Μπακόuλας; classical transcription Ioannis Bakoulas, born March 3, 1969) is an American musician. He is best known for his work with the post-grunge band Second Coming, where he played bass guitar. He was also a founding member of the band Sleze, which was later renamed Alice N' Chains (a precursor to Alice in Chains that also featured vocalist Layne Staley), The Crying Spell, Lotus Crush, and The Rumba Kings.

== Early life ==
Johnny Bacolas is a first-generation American born to Greek parents who met at St. Demetrios Greek Orthodox Church in Seattle, Washington. His mother, Patricia Bacolas, was born in Lamia, Greece, and works as an artist from her home in Kirkland, Washington. His father, George Bacolas (1932-2005), was born in Athens, Greece, and worked as a restaurateur, owning several different restaurants throughout his lifetime.

Bacolas has stated that his love for music was sparked when his father George brought home various vinyl records that he rotated from the jukeboxes at his restaurants once they ran their course in the Top 40, citing Elton John, Barry Manilow, and old Motown as some of his earliest influences. He started playing guitar at the age of 12. Soon after, he formed his first band with childhood friend and drummer, James Bergstrom.

Bacolas has cited a myriad of musical styles (particularly from the 1970s) and artists, such as Black Sabbath, Pet Shop Boys, and Gipsy Kings, as some of his other influences.

== Career ==
=== Sleze and Alice N' Chains (1984–1987) ===
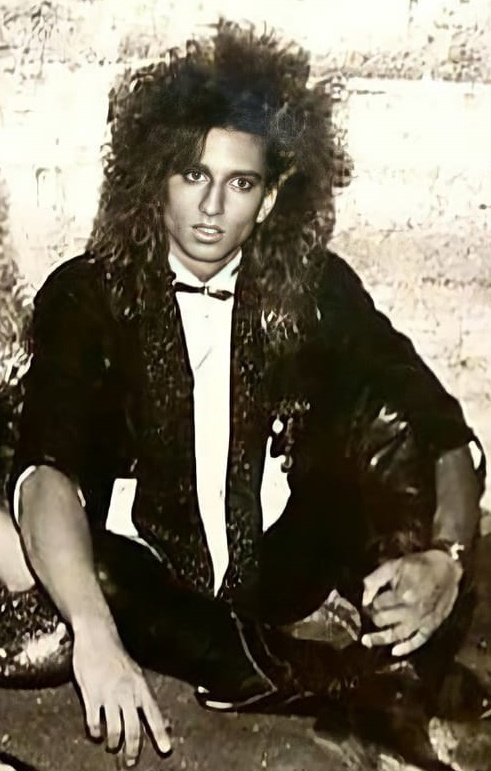
Bacolas with Alice N' Chains in 1987

In 1984, Bacolas started a garage band called Sleze along with James Bergstrom and two other Shorewood High students, Zoli Semanate and Byron Hansen. At the suggestion of Bergstrom's friend Ken Elmer, they recruited Elmer's stepbrother Layne Staley, who back then also went by the surname Elmer, as vocalist."We were just blown away by him," remembered lead guitarist Johnny Bacolas in Greg Prato's 2009 chronicle Grunge Is Dead: The Oral History of Seattle Rock Music. "He had 'star qualities' even then. He was much more timid – he looked down while he sang, but the grain of his voice was there, the soul was there."

In 1985, Sleze began performing live at various high schools with Bacolas on guitar. They mostly played Slayer and Armored Saint covers. "The first song we jammed was, "L.o.v.e. Machine" by Wasp. Then we did an Armored Saint song, a Mötley Crüe song, and after doing a few songs together, that was the band." says Bacolas in Grunge is Dead: An Oral History of Seattle Music by Greg Prato. In a 1985 airing of the television program, Town Meeting, featured on KOMO 4 Seattle, Staley and Bacolas appear on the show to protest censorship from the PMRC (Parents Music Resource Center). Staley and Bacolas were in attendance in the studio audience (Bacolas sitting on Staley's right). Frank Zappa was the guest speaker opposing the PMRC. At one point during the program, the host gives Staley an opportunity to speak into the microphone, and Staley makes the following statement, directed to one of the co-founders of the PMRC, and guest speaker on the program, Sally Nevius, "I play for a rock band called Sleze, and there's enough controversy on our name, more or less than our songs. We just signed with a local record company. I don't feel there's anything objectionable about any of our songs, but I don't feel anyone anyone else has the right to rate our songs I mean, I'm the only one that has the right to rate my album, you don't have it."

Sleze went through several lineup changes before they eventually changed their name to Alice N' Chains. At one point, Bacolas briefly left the group to jam with another band called Ascendant, where he took up playing bass guitar. By the time he rejoined Sleze, the band had already written what would eventually be recorded on the two demos they put out under the moniker Alice N' Chains. The group continued to perform throughout the Seattle area before they broke up around 1987, which was the year that Bacolas graduated from Shorewood High.

A few months after Alice N' Chains broke up, Layne Staley joined the glam metal band that eventually took the name Alice in Chains, which Bacolas later claimed was the name that the two of them along with the other members of Sleze had initially flirted with. Throughout the rest of his career, Staley continued to stay in touch with Bacolas and the two of them shared an apartment during the mid-1990s.

=== Formation of Second Coming and Layne Staley (1994–1996) ===
Meanwhile, Bacolas continued working with James Bergstrom, and in May 1993, they formed a band called Second Coming. In 1994, they independently released their debut album L.O.V.Evil, which features a guest appearance by Layne Staley on the track "It's Coming After". The band, along with special guest, Layne Staley, performed at its CD release party for L.O.V.Evil on September 9, 1994, at The Fenix Underground in Seattle, Washington.

In 1995, Bacolas and Staley became roommates after Staley asked Bacolas to move in with at his home located in the Queen Anne area of Seattle. During this time, Pearl Jam guitarist Mike McCready was forming the group Mad Season, and would regularly contact Bacolas to ask if he could come over to their home to talk to Staley about singing on the band's upcoming album. Bacolas would oblige and allow McCready into the home to wait for Staley to wake-up. In Greg Prato's book, Grunge is Dead, The Oral History of Seattle Music, Bacolas states that once Staley would wake-up, McCready would then play song ideas to Staley on a guitar, and Staley would be impressed. Staley subsequently agreed to record on Mad Season's record, Above.

Staley arranged for Bacolas' band, Second Coming, to open for Mad Season at Seattle nightclub RKCNDY on New Year's Eve of 1995. Staley performed several shows with Second Coming while roommates with Bacolas. Bacolas was also performing in a band called FTA, which was the same band as Second Coming, but played cover songs on the outskirts of Seattle. Bacolas recalls Staley showing up to the band's shows, alongside Bacolas' father, George Bacolas, and would perform songs like "Would" and "Man in the Box" with the band, to the delight of the audience in attendance.

Bacolas says of Staley in Greg Prato's Book, Grunge is Dead, "The guy was one of the nicest, most humble, sincere people that you'll ever meet."

=== Second Coming (1996–2008) ===
In 1996 Bacolas and Bergstrom replaced the vocalist/guitarist of the group. In the subsequent months, the new members of Second Coming wrote, produced, and financed an 8-song demo (which was produced by Kelly Gray and Dudley Taft). The band performed cover songs on the outskirts of Seattle under the moniker FTA to finance the demo. Once the recording was finished, the band dropped their cover act, and began performing solely as Second Coming. The band subsequently generated a massive buzz in the Seattle area performing their original songs. On May 9, 1998, Second Coming signed an exclusive recording agreement with Capitol Records Inc. and released their eponymous second album Second Coming. Second Coming had three singles chart in Billboard's active-rock chart ("Soft" #9, "Vintage Eyes" #10, and "The Unknown Rider" #11). "The Unknown Rider" was featured in the 1999 blockbuster Bruce Willis film The Sixth Sense. The band toured extensively throughout the US supporting and performing with acts such as Van Halen, Candlebox, Monster Magnet, Kid Rock, Lenny Kravitz, Fuel, Sponge, Sammy Hagar, and The Goo Goo Dolls. The band split from Capitol Records in 2002 after the departure of Gary Gersh, the president who signed them to the label. Following the split, they independently released an EP titled Acoustic and third studio album 13.

=== Other projects (2009–2014) ===
From 2004 to 2007, Bacolas focused on his production skills by apprenticing as a producer and audio engineer for Kelly Gray. During this time, in 2006, Bacolas helped start another band called The Crying Spell, which played "Man in the Box" with Live vocalist Ed Kowalczyk at the 2009 Layne Staley Tribute Concert. Bacolas left The Crying Spell early in 2010 to focus on his putting together his own group. In 2008, Bacolas partnered with electronica producer, Andrea Martini (Emotive Sounds, Copenhagen, Denmark) to produce trance and house remixes, primarily of songs he had prior song-writing and/or production involvement with. Also in 2008, Bacolas is credited for co-producing a track titled, "The Great Big Sleep" for Clive Barker's 2008 horror film, The Midnight Meat Train.

In 2010 Bacolas performed several shows as the bassist for the group Lotus Crush. The group features vocalist Terry McDermott, who was made famous on the third season of NBC's The Voice (2012) as the 2nd runner-up. Lotus Crush also features guitarist Peter Klett and drummer Scott Mercado from the group Candlebox.

In December 2011, Bacolas released a video for the Greek classic "To Agalma" of which he produced and engineered the music and co-directed and produced the video. The song was originally recorded in the late sixties by Greek singer Giannis Poulopoulos and written by the highly respected songwriters, Lefteris Papadopoulos & Mimis Plessas. Bacolas is also credited as the bassist and keyboardist on the track. The project was an international collaboration, featuring several artists from Bacolas' hometown of Seattle, and well as well-known Greek vocalist Giorgos Sarris (formerly lead vocalist for Greek group Zigk Zagk) from Athens, Greece, and guitarist Josh Sulfaro, from Los Angeles, CA. To film the shots of vocalist, Giorgos Sarris in Athens, Bacolas partnered-up with Greek director Sherif francis.

In June 2011, Bacolas produced a track titled "Ophelia" by the Alexandroupolis, Greece-based group, INK. Bacolas makes a cameo appearance in the official music video.

In May 2012, Bacolas produced and released a remake of George Michael's "Careless Whisper" with X Factor US (2011) contestant Tiger Budbill.

=== The Rumba Kings ===
In June 2015, Bacolas formed the Latin & Mediterranean inspired group, The Rumba Kings, with Romany-Gypsy guitarist/songwriter, George Stevens. Soon after, Bacolas and Stevens began recording The Rumba King's debut double-disc album, titled The Instrumental and Vocal Sessions, Vol I. Bacolas produced and engineered the record, and was mixed and mastered by Martin Feveyear. Recording of the music took place in Lakeview Studio in Kirkland, WA., Northside Studio in Athens, Greece, Sofita Studio in Athens, Greece, and Robert Lang Studio in Shoreline, WA. The Instrumental and Vocal Sessions Vol I was released on February 17, 2018.

In June 2019, The Rumba Kings released their sophomore album, titled The Instrumental Sessions, Vol. II, which was also produced and engineered by Bacolas, and mixed and mastered by Martin Feveyear. In early and mid 2020, The Rumba Kings released two more singles, "Mirame," (February 2020) which was written by Horacio Alcantar (lyrics) and George Stevens (music), and "Dance with me," (June 2020) which was written by Bacolas (lyrics) and George Stevens (music). During the pandemic of 2020, The Rumba Kings stayed busy re-crafting their entire live show, writing, recording and releasing new music, and publishing several videos, which they titled, "The quarantine sessions." The Rumba Kings began performing live in the greater Seattle area beginning in April 2016 to present day.

== Discography ==
Second Coming

Year	Album details
1994	L.O.V.Evil: Released: June 16, 1994; Label: Red Rocket
1998	Second Coming: Released: September 22, 1998; Label: Timestyle/Capitol
2002	Acoustic: Released: 2002; Label: Timestyle
2003	13: Released: 2003; Label: Timestyle

Darin Isaacs

Year	Album details
2007	Here with Me Now: Released: 2007; Label: Electric Head

The Crying Spell

Year	Album details
2008	Through Hell to Heaven: Released: July 15, 2008; Label: Streamline

Lotus Crush

Year	Album details
2011	Half Light Morning: Released: 2011; Label: Fontana

Owin' Soul

Year	Album details
2012	Warm August Day: Released: 2012; Label: Private
2012	Higher Place: Released: 2012; Label: Private
2012	Garden Stone: Released: 2012; Label: Private

Solo

Year	Album details
2011	To Agalma: Released 2011; Label: Private
2012	The Sin: Released: 2012; Label: Johnny Bacolas Productions

Tiger Budbill

Year	Album details
2012	Careless Whisper: Released: 2012; Label: Private

The Rumba Kings

Year	Album details
2018	The Instrumental and Vocal Sessions, Vol I: Released: February 17, 2018; Label: The Rumba Kings Recordings
2019	The Instrumental Sessions, Vol II: Released: June 1, 2019; Label: The Rumba Kings Recordings
2024	Whispers of Passion: Released: September 21, 2024; Label: The Rumba Kings Recordings
