= Chad Channing =

American musician; former drummer of Nirvana (born 1967)

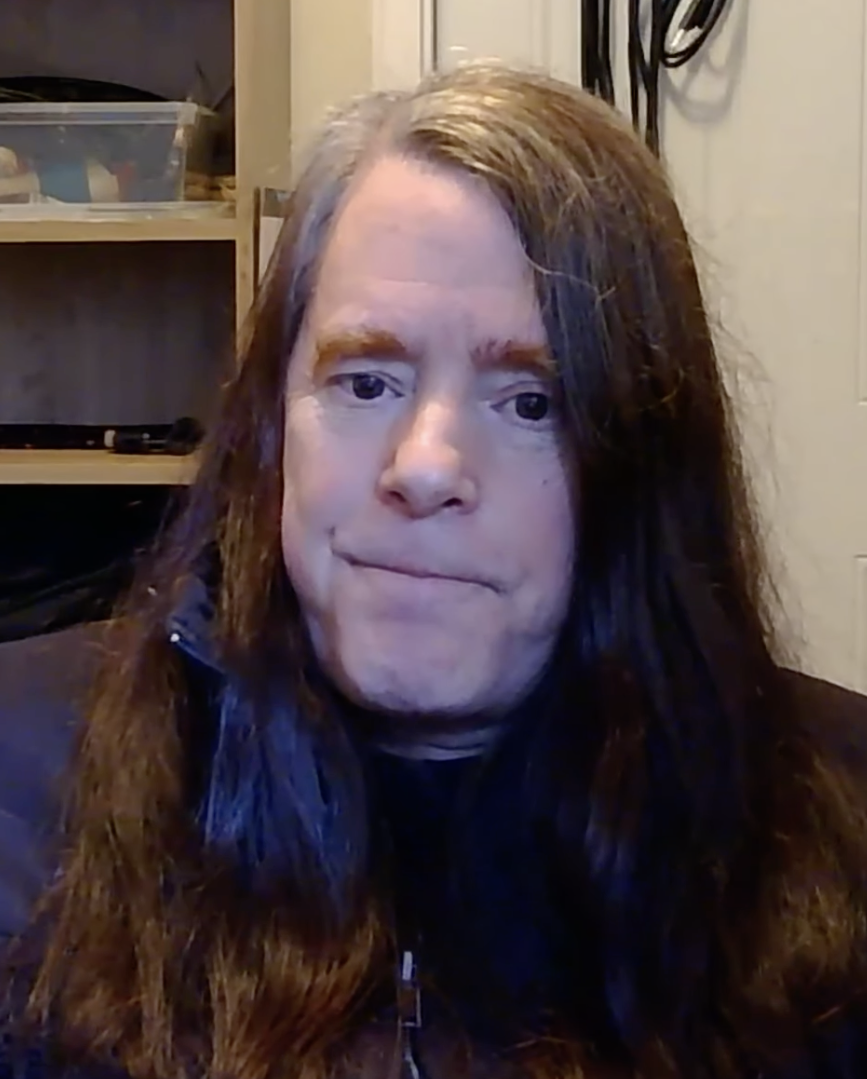
- Channing in 2026

Background information
- Born: January 31, 1967 (age 59)
- Origin: Santa Rosa, California U.S.
- Genres: Hard rock; grunge; indie rock; alternative rock; punk rock; hardcore punk
- Occupation: Musician
- Instruments: Drums; vocals; bass
- Years active: 1985-Present
- Labels: Sub Pop; Dekema
- Member of: Before Cars
- Formerly of: Nirvana; Stonecrow; Redband; East of the Equator; Tic Dolly Row; Mind Circus; The Methodists; Fire Ants

Chad Channing (born January 31, 1967, in Santa Rosa, California) is an American musician who is best known as the drummer of the rock band Nirvana from 1988 to 1990, during which time they recorded and released their debut album Bleach; he also appears on "Polly" in the follow-up album Nevermind.

Channing has remained active in music, most recently recording as part of the duo Can of Clouds in 2024.

== Biography ==
=== Early life ===
Channing was born on January 31, 1967, in Santa Rosa, California, to Wayne and Burnyce Channing. Wayne was a radio disc jockey and the family was constantly moving all over the country due to different jobs being offered to him. At 13, Chad shattered his femur in an accident during gym class. Over the years of rehabilitation and surgeries, he discovered music; he started playing music with a bass guitar that his parents bought him. The bass filled Chad's time as he was unable to go to school. When he was out of his leg casts, his parents bought him a drum set to help build strength in his legs.

Channing joined a band with future Nirvana guitarist Jason Everman called Stonecrow in 1985. Everman had known Channing since fifth grade, and the two had played in bands together in high school. Later, while working as a sauté cook on Bainbridge Island, Washington, Channing started the band Tick-Dolly-Row with Chris Karr, John Hurd and Ben Shepherd, also a Bainbridge Islander, who would later become the bassist for Soundgarden. Tick-Dolly-Row shared a bill with Nirvana, who at the time were going under the name Bliss. Not long after, a mutual friend introduced Channing to Kurt Cobain and Krist Novoselic, who were searching for a drummer. The three got together several times for jam sessions before they started playing shows.

=== Nirvana ===
Channing with Nirvana on the cover of their single, "Love Buzz" (1988)

In June 1988, a few weeks after Channing joined Nirvana, they recorded their first single "Love Buzz", also marking their Sub Pop debut. Nirvana began the recording sessions for Bleach on Christmas Eve 1988, finishing toward the end of January 1989. Everman, a friend of the band, agreed to pay money for recording. Bleach was released on June 15, 1989. Channing played drums with the exception of the songs "Floyd the Barber" and "Paper Cuts", which featured Melvins drummer Dale Crover from sessions prior to Channing joining the band. Reissues of Bleach included the song "Downer", which also had Crover from those sessions.

In April 1990, Nirvana recorded eight songs at Smart Studios with producer Butch Vig for the band's second album, although the sessions were halted after Cobain lost his voice. During these sessions creative and artistic differences culminated in Channing's departure by mutual decision after their April–May 1990 tour. Dave Grohl was hired to play drums, and he adapted Channing’s drum parts for many songs.

Nirvana used the Smart recordings as a demo to secure a new contract with a major label and the band re-recorded the tracks for a new studio album in late 1990. The Smart version of "Polly" with Channing on percussion was the only holdover from the session and appeared on Nevermind . However, Channing was not credited for his part in “Polly” until the Deluxe re-issue of Nevermind.

Due to Nirvana's popularity and longevity, the issuing of their older work continued, both during the band's existence and following their demise. The 1992 compilation Incesticide featured the tracks "Dive", "Stain", and "Big Long Now", all crediting Channing as drummer. Live versions of "Polly" and "Breed" that included Channing appeared on From the Muddy Banks of the Wishkah, a live album released in 1996. The 2004 With the Lights Out box set featured a DVD of a December 1988 Nirvana rehearsal, as well as seven songs scattered across the first two discs of the set, all with Channing on drums.

Following Nirvana's induction into the Rock and Roll Hall of Fame in December 2013, Channing said in an interview with the Radio.com website that he perceived the recognition as a gift for his daughter. However, Channing was later informed of his omission via text message, and was not included in the April 2014 induction, as the accolade only applied to Cobain, Novoselic and Grohl. Channing did attend the ceremony, and his replacement Dave Grohl made a point to publicly thank Channing for his contributions to the band and noted that some of Nirvana's most recognizable drum riffs, such as those on "In Bloom", were in fact written by Channing.

=== Post-Nirvana work ===
After leaving Nirvana, Channing formed the Fire Ants who released the Stripped EP on Dekema Records in 1992, produced by Jack Endino, who had produced Bleach. Members of the Fire Ants included Brian Wood (vocals) and Kevin Wood (guitars), brothers of the late Mother Love Bone singer Andrew Wood, and bassist Dan McDonald. Channing and McDonald collaborated again in 1998 with John Hurd and Erik Spicer, forming The Methodists who released the album Cookie.

Chad stepped from behind the drum set to front his new project Before Cars, which released the single "Old Chair" in 2006. They released their debut album Walk Back in 2008, again produced by Jack Endino. Channing supplies lead vocals and bass on all tracks as well as some acoustic guitar. In 2015 he released an album under the name Benkyo.

In 2024 he formed a duo called Can of Clouds with Justine Jeanotte. They have released an album called Passing Vistas.

== Discography ==
=== With Tic Dolly Row ===
- Live demo (1987)

=== With Nirvana ===
Release	Notes
Bleach (1989)	Does not appear on "Floyd the Barber", and "Paper Cuts", nor on "Downer" in the 1992 reissue
Blew (1989)	EP; appears on all tracks
Nevermind (1991)	Appears on "Polly" (uncredited until the Deluxe edition)
Incesticide (1992)	Compilation; appears on "Dive", "Stain", and "Big Long Now"
From the Muddy Banks of the Wishkah (1996)	Live album; appears on "Polly" and "Breed"
Nirvana (2002)	Compilation; appears on "About a Girl" and "Been a Son"
With the Lights Out box set (2004)	Drums on tracks 16, 17, 21-23 (disc one), tracks 6 & 7 (disc two), and tracks 1-12 (DVD)
Bleach deluxe edition (2009)	Reissue with bonus Pine Street Theatre live performance; Channing appears on said performance. Channing does not appear on "Floyd the Barber", "Paper Cuts" or "Downer" on the main album
Nevermind deluxe/super deluxe edition (2011)	Expanded edition; appears on the Smart Studios sessions, and is officially credited for the cymbals on "Polly" on the main album

=== With Fire Ants ===
- Ant Acid 7" (1992)
- Stripped EP (1992)

=== With The Methodists ===
- Cookie (1998)

=== With Before Cars ===
- Old Chair EP (2006)
- Walk Back (2008)
- How We Run (2013)

Preceded by Dave Foster	Drummer of Nirvana; 1988–1990	Succeeded by Dale Crover
