= James Bergstrom =

American drummer (born 1969)

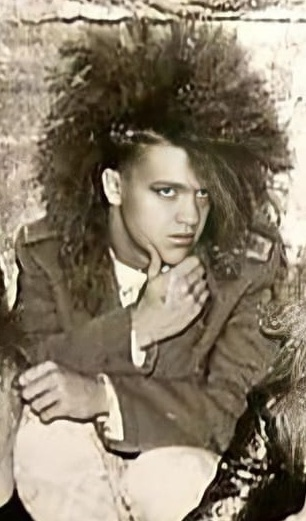
- Bergstrom in 1987 as part of Alice N' Chains

Background information
- Born: June 25, 1969 (age 57)
- Genres: Alternative rock, alternative metal, post-grunge, hard rock, glam metal (early)
- Occupation: Drummer
- Years active: 1985–present
- Formerly of: Sleze, Alice N' Chains, Second Coming

James Bergstrom (born June 25, 1969) is an American musician best known as the drummer for the rock band Second Coming. Before that, he played drums for the band Sleze (later renamed Alice N' Chains), which also featured future Alice in Chains vocalist Layne Staley.

== Career ==
=== Alice N' Chains ===
In 1984, Bergstrom co-founded a garage band called Sleze, whose jam room was set up in his parents' basement. At the suggestion of his friend Ken Elmer, Bergstrom and his bandmates recruited Elmer's stepbrother Layne Staley, who back then also went by the surname Elmer, as vocalist. They performed live at various high schools, playing Slayer and Armored Saint covers. This band went through several lineup changes before changing their name to Alice N' Chains. The group continued to tour throughout the Seattle area and recorded two demos before they broke up around 1987, which was the year that Bergstrom graduated from Shorewood High. Staley went on to form the band Alice in Chains whose 1990 debut album Facelift lists Bergstrom as one of the people they wished to thank. Nick Pollock, another former member of Sleze/Alice N' Chains, became lead singer of the band My Sister's Machine, which also thanked Bergstrom within the liner notes of their 1992 debut album Diva.

=== Second Coming ===
Meanwhile, Bergstrom co-founded the band Second Coming sometime in the early 1990s and was eventually joined by his childhood friend Johnny Bacolas, who had also been a member of Sleze/Alice N' Chains. This band also went through several lineup changes throughout its history with Bergstrom as the sole constant member before breaking up in 2008. Their catalog consists of three studio albums and one acoustic EP, all of which feature both Bergstrom and Bacolas.

In 1994, they independently released their debut album L.O.V.Evil, which features a guest appearance by Layne Staley on the track "It's Coming After". Four years later, they signed on to Capitol Records and released their eponymous second album Second Coming. This album produced two singles titled "Soft" and "Vintage Eyes", the latter of which had a music video. Another track titled "Unknown Rider" was included on the soundtrack for the blockbuster film The Sixth Sense. The band split from Capitol Records in 2001 after the departure of Gary Gersh, the president who signed them to the label. Following the split, they independently released an EP titled Acoustic and third studio album 13.

Second Coming were purportedly working on a fourth album that was due to be released in 2007. However, the band has since broken up. While the other members of Second Coming have continued to record and perform with other acts, Bergstrom has largely focused on family life but he still keeps in touch with his former bandmates.

=== Career in Real Estate ===
After leaving the music industry, Bergstrom transitioned into real estate. Based in Kitsap County, Washington, he has worked as a broker and the owner of Paramount Real Estate Group. In 2025, he was recognized by FastExpert as a “Top Agent” in Bremerton, Port Orchard, and Seabeck, and was named a Five Star Real Estate Agent by Five Star Professional.

== Discography ==
Year	Album details	Band
1994	L.O.V.Evil: Released: June 16, 1994; Label: Red Rocket	Second Coming
1998	Second Coming: Released: September 22, 1998; Label: Capitol	Second Coming
2002	Acoustic: Released: 2002; Label: Timestyle	Second Coming
2003	13: Released: 2003; Label: Timestyle	Second Coming
