= Dekema Records =

American record label

Dekema Records is a record label that first achieved notice in the 1990s for releasing the EP "Stripped" by the seminal grunge rock group the Fire Ants. Dekema used music producer Jack Endino to record the band at Word of Mouth studios in 1992. Endino is best known for producing "Bleach" by Nirvana and his work with Sub Pop artists such as Mudhoney and Soundgarden.

The Fire Ants were a "super group" that formed during the big major label-signing era of Seattle bands. Members of the band included Brian and Kevin Wood (brothers of Andrew Wood, formerly of Mother Love Bone), Chad Channing (formerly of Nirvana) and Dan McDonald (former bassist for Native Messiah and Strait Face). Prior to the Fire Ants, Kevin and Andrew Wood both performed in the band Malfunkshun.

In 2015, "Stripped" was remastered by Jack Endino and released as a Deluxe Edition with an additional nine demo tracks included.

== Label history ==
Dekema Records was founded by Edward Dekema in 1991 and based out of Woodinville, WA, a suburb of Seattle. Ed was the executive producer for the early 1990s releases by the Fire Ants, Moonshine and Johnnie Bravo. In addition to working with Jack Endino, the label also released recordings produced by Marty Jourard, formerly of the 1980s new wave group the Motels.

== Artists ==
- Fire Ants
- Moonshine
- Johnnie Bravo
- Garden Blue
- Chloride Productions
- Shawn Deena
- The Medicine
- Honeycomb
- DJ Dr. K

== See also ==
- List of record labels
