= L.O.V.Evil =

Studio album by Second Coming
- Released: June 16, 1994
- Recorded: August 1993
- Genre: Alternative rock, alternative metal
- Label: Red Rocket Records
- Producer: Maxi

Second Coming chronology
L.O.V.Evil (1994)	Second Coming (1998)

L.O.V.Evil is the debut studio album by American rock band Second Coming.

== Track listing ==
=== Original release ===
All tracks written by Jesse "Maxi" Holt, except where noted.

No.	Title	Writer(s)	Length
1.	"Afraid of Love"		4:23
2.	"The Great Big Burn"	Troy Bethel and Maxi	4:49
3.	"Television Skin"		4:07
4.	"Beautiful and Everything"		3:46
5.	"So Wired"	Ron Holt	4:23
6.	"M.T. Your Gun"		4:39
7.	"Funch"		4:21
8.	"It's Coming After" (featuring Layne Staley)	Ron Holt	2:59

=== Reissue ===
No.	Title	Length
1.	"Afraid of Love"	4:23
2.	"The Great Big Burn"	4:49
3.	"Television Skin"	4:07
4.	"Beautiful and Everything"	3:46
5.	"So Wired"	4:23
6.	"M.T. Your Gun"	4:39
7.	"Funch"	4:21
8.	"The Great Big Burn (Green Mix)"	5:03
9.	"M.T. Your Gun (Red Violence (Mix)"	5:02
10.	"The Great Big Burn (Radio Edit)"	4:13
11.	"M.T. Your Gun (Radio Edit)"	4:13
12.	"It's Coming After" (featuring Layne Staley)	2:59

== Personnel ==
The album's credits and personnel can be obtained from the liner notes.

Second Coming

- Maxi — vocals, guitar, programming
- James Bergstrom — drums
- Johnny Bacolas — bass
- Mark Nelson — rhythm guitar

Production

- Produced by Second Coming
- Executive producer — Joshua B. Michaels
