= Sweet Water (band) =

American rock band

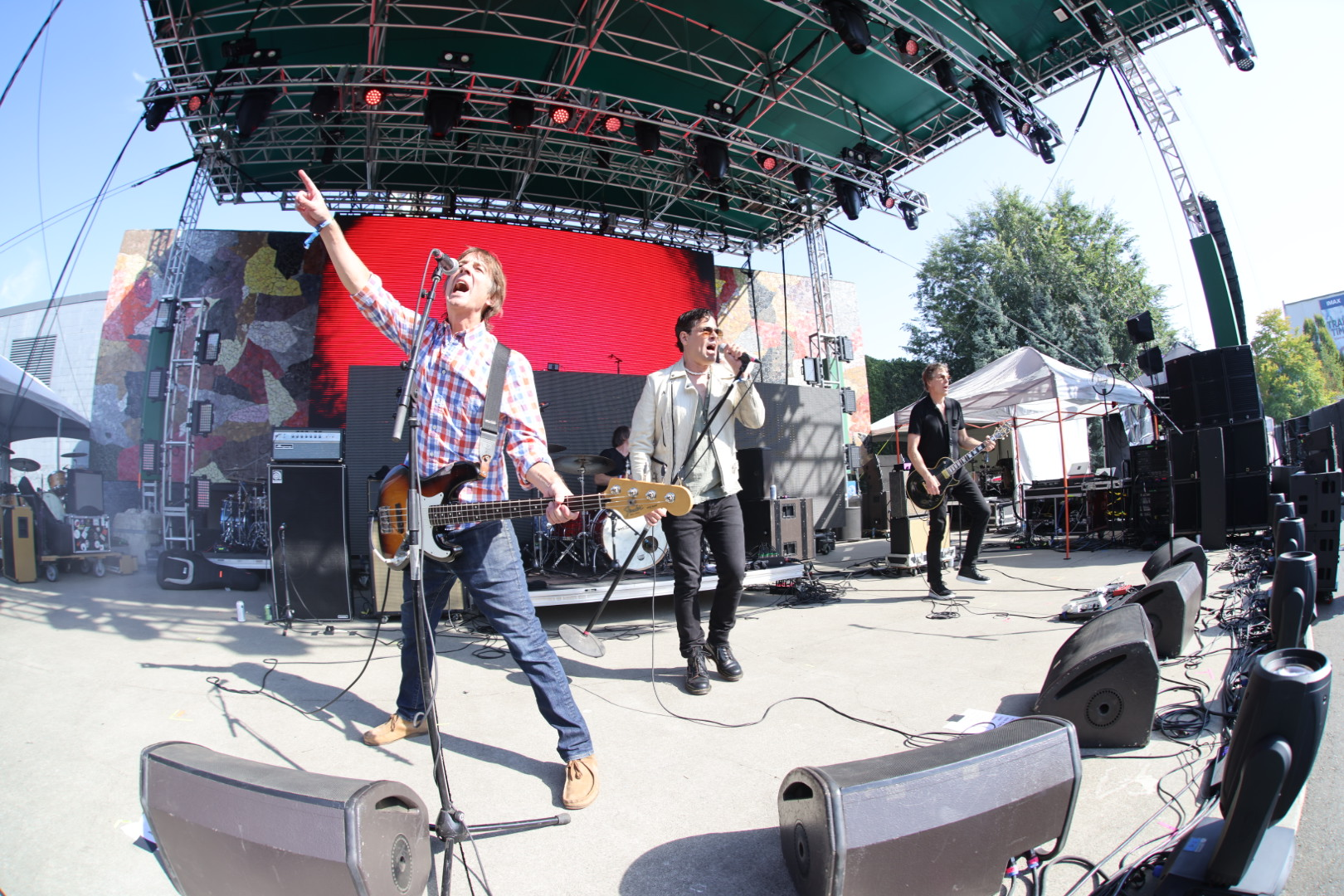
- Sweet Water performs in Seattle in 2023.

Background information
- Also known as: SGM (1985–1990); Parc Boys (1996–1998)
- Origin: Seattle, Washington, United States
- Genres: Alternative rock, punk rock, new wave, grunge, hard rock
- Years active: 1985–1999; 2007–present
- Members: Adam Czeisler; Cole Peterson; Rich Credo; Chris Friel
- Past members: Paul Uhlir; Dudley Taft; Chris Quinn; Mike Lawson
- Website: www.sweetwaterrocks.com

Sweet Water is an American rock band from Seattle, Washington. They were initially known as SGM before changing to Sweet Water in 1990. They were signed to the major labels Atlantic Records and EastWest Records throughout the 1990s, although they went on a hiatus in 1999. The band reformed in 2007.

== History ==
=== Formation and Aggression (1985–1990) ===
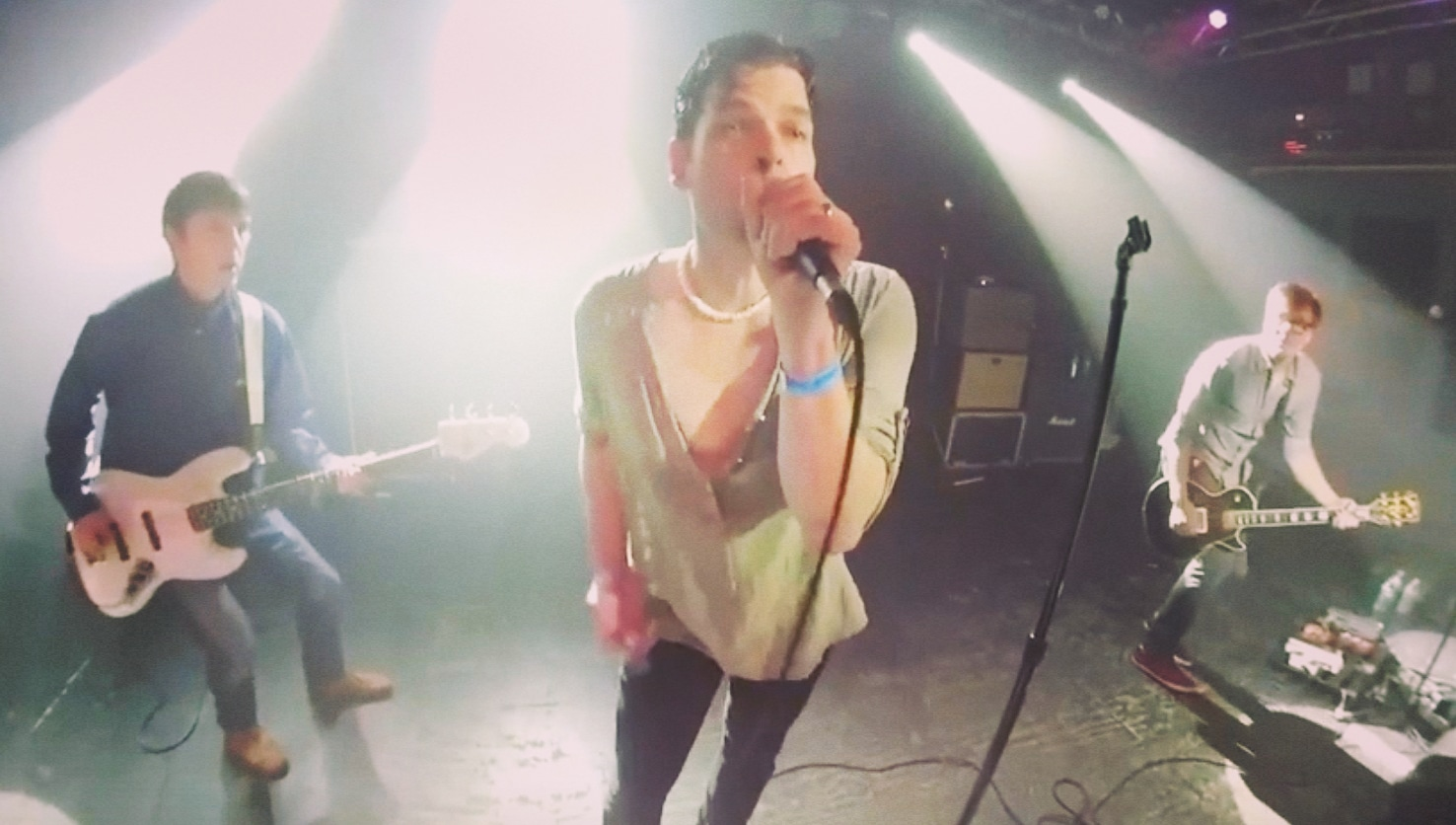
Sweet Water live

Originally known as SGM, the majority of the band's members met while students at The Bush School. SGM consisted of Cole Peterson on bass, Paul Uhlir on drums, Rich Credo on guitars, Mike Lawson on vocals, and Chris Quinn on guitars. The initials were meant to convey a different name periodically, such as Shot Gun Messiah, Such Good Music, Spontaneous Generation Men, and so on. SGM had garnered acclaim as second generation punk pioneers in the Seattle scene, playing with Nirvana, The Accüsed, The Rejectors, Melvins, and more. They blended punk rock with thrash metal elements. SGM released the album Aggression in 1988. It was engineered and produced by Jack Endino. Bruce Pavitt of Sub Pop Records later overly hyped one of SGM's demo cassettes as "Young, loud and crazy. Better than Soundgarden and Green River put together. Better than Led Zep and the Stooges even."

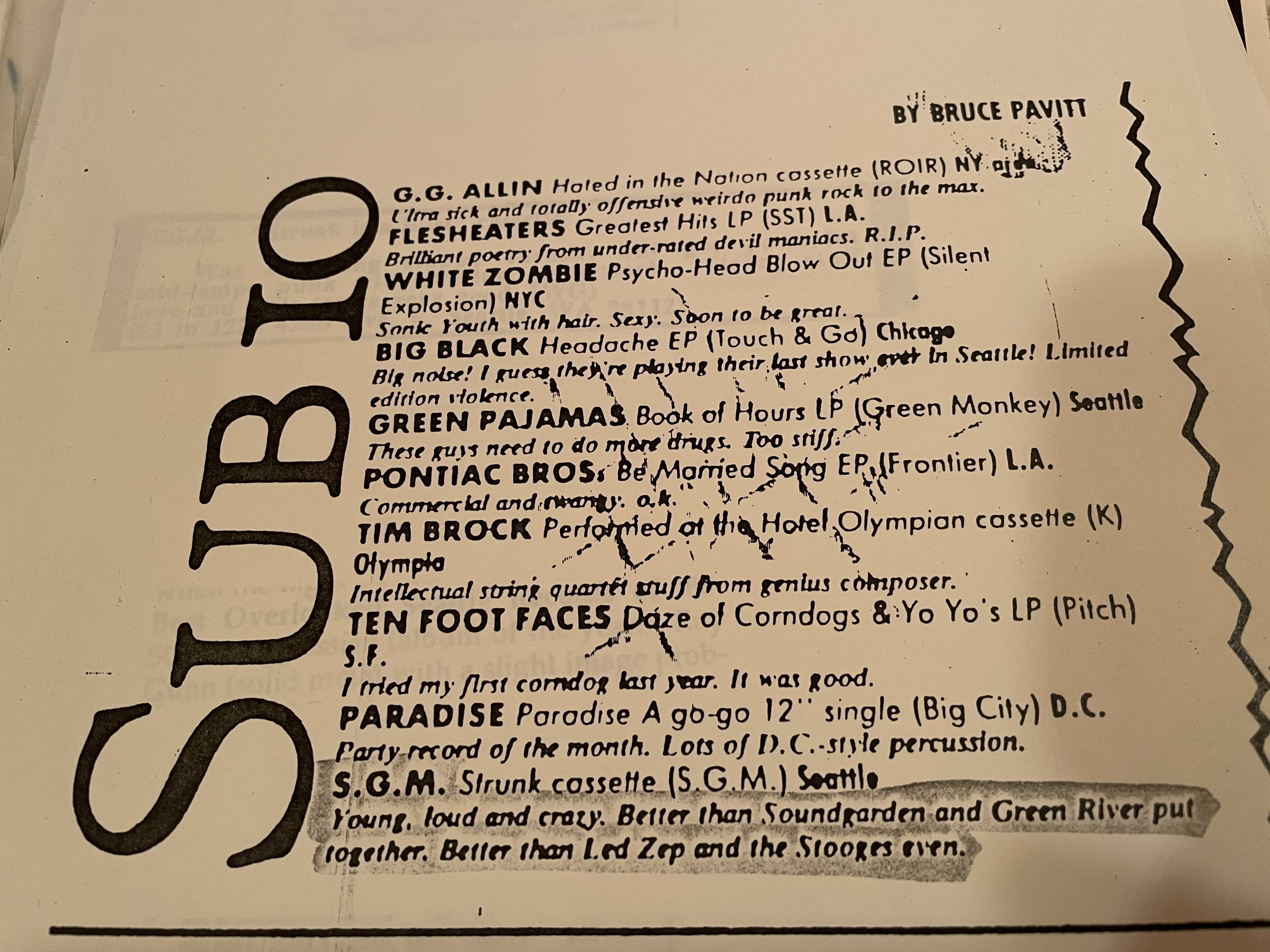
Photo of Sub10 Review

By the end of 1988, Lawson departed from the band in order to attend college, and after various one-off vocalists and brief tenures, he was replaced permanently by Adam Czeisler. In 1989, SGM's song "Power" appeared on the soundtrack to the horror film Leatherface: Texas Chainsaw Massacre III.

=== Ter, major label signing, Sweet Water, and Superfriends (1990–1995) ===
In 1990, Quinn left the band in order to form Truly. The remaining members of SGM then added guitarist Dudley Taft to the lineup, and as a result they formally changed their name to Sweet Water. The band initially played at numerous Seattle venues, such as RKCNDY, Mural Amphitheatre (the Pain in the Grass festival), and Off Ramp Café. After recording various demos, Sweet Water independently released a self-titled album in 1992 with management from Susan Silver's firm (it was also known as Ter due to the letters on the front of the cover and to differentiate it from the band's next release). It was produced by Don Gilmore (known for working with Mother Love Bone and Pearl Jam). Although Ter was initially self-released, the independent Seattle label New Rage Records picked up the album and properly released it as well.

The band was signed later that year by Jason Flom of Atlantic Records. Sweet Water released their second self-titled album (Sweet Water) in 1993. It was produced by Gilmore again, and mixed by Tim Palmer (who also worked with Mother Love Bone and Pearl Jam with Gilmore, in addition to working with Tin Machine and Robert Plant). A handful of tracks on Sweet Water were re-recordings of Ter songs. "Crawl" off of Sweet Water appeared on the soundtrack to the 1993 film Amongst Friends. "Crawl", "Head Down", and "Everything Will Be Alright" were released as the album's singles. Sweet Water toured the US with Winger during the summer of 1993. Sweet Water's subsequent lengthy US tour was with Candlebox and The Flaming Lips in late 1994.

The band then shifted labels as they moved to Elektra Records' subsidiary EastWest Records, and they recorded a follow-up record, Superfriends, in 1995. Dave Jerden served as producer. Jerden previously worked with other bands such as Alice in Chains, Jane's Addiction, Anthrax, among others. Jerden described his experience with the band as "Mott the Hoople meets the 90s". Guitarist Taft was fired during the recording of Superfriends although his contributions remained on the album. Ultimately, Sweet Water's sound had shifted with Credo as the sole guitarist. "Superstar" was released as the lead single to support Superfriends. The band played at the 1995 iteration of the Seattle festival Bumbershoot, along with a handful of other shows in September and October of that year.

=== Two Weeks to Live, Suicide, and disbandment (1995–1999) ===
Sweet Water faced complications with their record labels (mainly due to internal mergers and realignments), and as a result they were unable to extensively tour or record. In order to circumvent the legal wranglings, the band changed their name to Parc Boys in 1996. They released an album titled Two Weeks to Live on the independent label Will Records in early 1998. It was produced alongside Martin Feveyear. Later that year, the band reverted to the Sweet Water name.

Jerden returned to produce the band's follow-up album, Suicide, for the EMI imprint The Enclave; however, plans eventually changed, and Suicide was instead released on the label Good-Ink Records in 1999. Suicide featured a few songs that previously appeared on Two Weeks to Live as well. The band spent 2000 to 2006 on a self-imposed hiatus, releasing no new music and playing no shows.

=== Reunion, Clear the Tarmac, Dance Floor Kills, and Firebird (2007–2018) ===
2007 saw their return to the stage and various rock websites reported an album in the works. In 2009, the band released Clear the Tarmac on Golden City Records, the label run by guitarist Credo. "Rock Steady" was released as the album's lead single, and its video garnered national airplay. Notable Seattle drummer Chris Friel (previously a member of Goodness and The Rockfords) replaced Uhlir in 2009.

2012 and 2013 saw more creative output from the band, with the 2012 release of a single entitled "Hey Living" with the b-side "Get High Clover". A music video was created for "Get High Clover". The five-song Dance Floor Kills EP followed in April 2013. Both releases were on the dual Fin Records/Golden City Records imprint, with Fin handling physical product and Golden City handling digital.

In November 2015, Sweet Water returned to the stage with a one-off performance at Seattle's Benaroya Hall. The show was the band's first performance with a full orchestra, and was notable for the unique on-stage collaboration with Seattle singer Shawn Smith. Summer of 2018 saw the release of the "Galer Street" single (with a supporting video) and two sold-out shows at the Paramount Theatre in Seattle with Green Apple Quick Step and Candlebox. In November, the band released the five-song Firebird EP on Golden City. They played several west coast shows in support of the release of Firebird.

=== Shine On and continued career (2018–present) ===
In early 2025, Sweet Water revealed plans for a new album with a release date of September 2025. "Kids" was released as the album's lead single around the same time. "State of Grace" was then released as the follow-up single. The album, Shine On, was released on September 18, 2025.

== Members ==
=== Current members ===
- Cole Peterson – bass (1985–1999, 2007–present)
- Rich Credo – guitars (1985–1999, 2007–present)
- Adam Czeisler – vocals (1988–1999, 2007–present)
- Chris Friel – drums (2009–present)

=== Former members ===
- Mike Lawson – vocals (1985–1988) (Note: This member was only a part of the lineup for SGM.)
- Chris Quinn – guitars (1985–1990)
- Dudley Taft – guitars (1990–1995)
- Paul Uhlir – drums (1985–1999, 2007–2009)

=== Timeline ===
Color denotes main live duty.

== Discography ==
Album title	Release date	Record label
Aggression (Note: Released under the SGM name.)	1988	Medusa Records
Ter (Note: This album is officially cataloged as a self-titled album, but is named Ter in order to differentiate it with the band's next album, which is also self-titled.)	1992	New Rage Records
Sweet Water	1993	Atlantic Records
Superfriends	1995	EastWest Records/Elektra Records
Two Weeks to Live (Note: Released under the Parc Boys name.)	1998	Will Records
Suicide	1999	Good-Ink Records
Clear the Tarmac	2009	Golden City Records
Dance Floor Kills (Note: Released as a mini-album/studio EP.)	2013	Golden City Records/Fin Records
Firebird	2018	Golden City Records
Shine On	2025	Golden City Records
