= List of female electronic musicians =

This is a list of female electronic musicians, composers, and sound artists who work in the various genres of electronic music, and the musical groups of which they are members.

== A ==
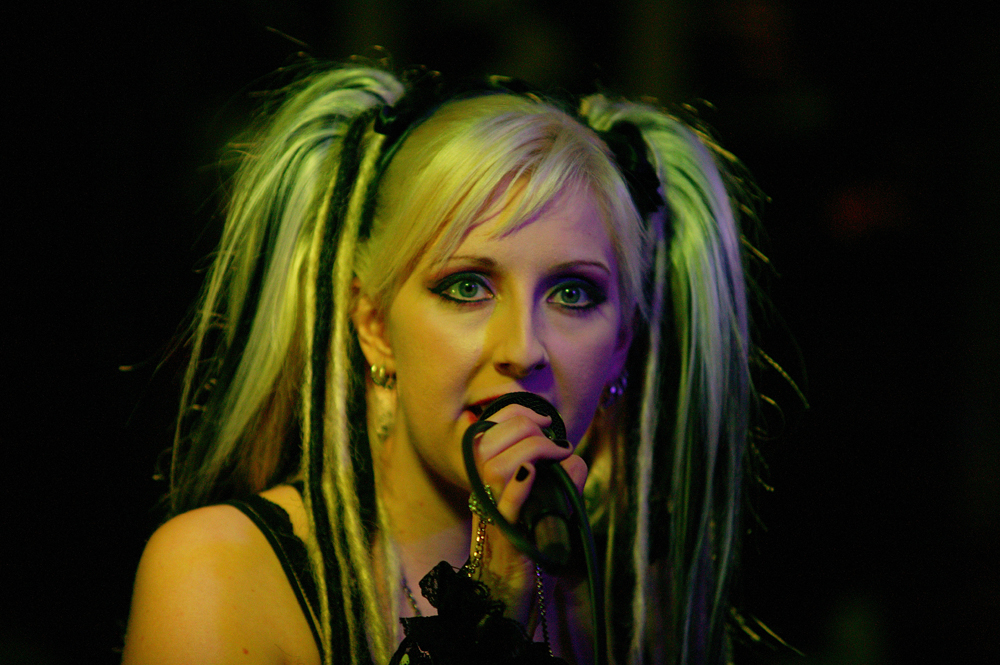
Ayria

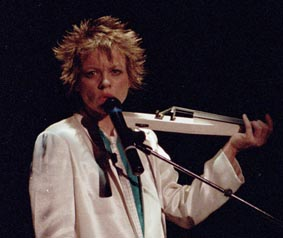
Laurie Anderson

- Sara Abdel-Hamid (Ikonika)
- Muhsinah Abdul-Karim (Muhsinah)
- Charlotte Adigéry
- Gaelle Adisson
- Nina Agzarian (Nina Las Vegas)
- Susan Alcorn
- Liset Alea (Etro Anime)
- Nadia Ali
- Dot Allison (Massive Attack, One Dove)
- Fatima Al Qadiri
- Maryanne Amacher
- Muireann Nic Amhlaoibh (Aeons)
- AMWE
- Beth Anderson
- Laurie Anderson
- Ruth Anderson
- Karin Dreijer Andersson (Fever Ray, the Knife)
- Jessie Andrews
- Leila Arab
- Mira Aroyo (Ladytron)
- Mathangi Arulpragasam (M.I.A.)
- Tone Åse
- Estelle Asmodelle
- Virginia Astley
- Kaitlyn Aurelia Smith
- Ana-Maria Avram

== B ==
- Jillian Rose Banks (Banks)
- Danielle Baquet-Long (Celer, Chubby Wolf)
- Caterina Barbieri
- Tahliah Barnett (FKA twigs)
- Elaine Barkin
- Natasha Barrett
- Françoise Barrière
- Bebe Barron
- Sarah Barthel (Phantogram)
- Julianna Barwick
- Tasha Baxter
- Eve Beglarian
- Anomie Belle
- Lisa Bella Donna
- Sydney Loren Bennett (Syd tha Kyd)
- Ayalah Bentovim (Sister Bliss of Faithless)
- Elizabeth Bernholz (Gazelle Twin)
- Johanna Magdalena Beyer
- Eithne Ní Bhraonáin (Enya)
- Sara Blackwood (Dubstar)
- Claire Boucher (Grimes)
- Michèle Bokanowski
- Kitty Brazelton
- Fiona Brice
- Phillipa Brown (Ladyhawke)
- Barbara Buchholz
- Kate Bush

== C ==
- Geneviève Calame
- Allison Cameron
- Janet Cardiff
- Wendy Carlos
- Robin Miriam Carlsson (Robyn)
- Caroline Cecil (Whipped Cream)
- Michelle Chamuel
- Maria Chavez
- Cocoa Chanelle
- Sharon Cheslow
- Mary Ellen Childs
- Insook Choi
- Dorit Chrysler
- Suzanne Ciani
- Anne Clark
- Annie Clark (St. Vincent)
- Sonia Clarke (Sonique)
- Jay Clayton
- Christine Clements (Vaccine)
- Alice Cohen
- Beth Coleman
- Maya Jane Coles (Nocturnal Sunshine)
- Nik Colk Void (Factory Floor)
- Juliette Commagere
- Cindy Cox
- Kara-Lis Coverdale
- Romy Madley Croft (The xx)

== D ==
- Dani Deahl
- Constance Demby
- Shikhee D'iordna (Android Lust)
- Nika Roza Danilova (Zola Jesus)
- Marie Davidson
- Camille Davila
- Charlotte de Witte
- Delia Derbyshire
- Daniela Di Lillo (Nora En Pure)
- Marina Diamandis
- Emma Lou Diemer
- Kui Dong
- Suzanne Doucet
- Candida Doyle (Pulp)
- Karin Dreijer
- Anne Dudley (Art of Noise)
- Erica Dunham (Unter Null)

== E ==
- Skye Edwards
- Hanin Elias
- Kate Elsworth
- Nic Endo
- Liz Enthusiasm (Freezepop)
- Mary Epworth
- Kristin Erickson (Kevin Blechdom)
- Pozzi Escot
- Laura Escudé
- Esthero
- Brooke Evers
- Carolina Eyck

== F ==
- Nanna Øland Fabricius (Oh Land)
- Johanna Fateman (MEN, Le Tigre)
- Maddalena Fagandini
- Beatriz Ferreyra
- Lauren Flax (CREEP)
- Ellen Fraatz (Ellen Allien)
- Aluna Francis (AlunaGeorge)
- Free Dominguez (Kidneythieves)
- Ellen Fullman

== G ==
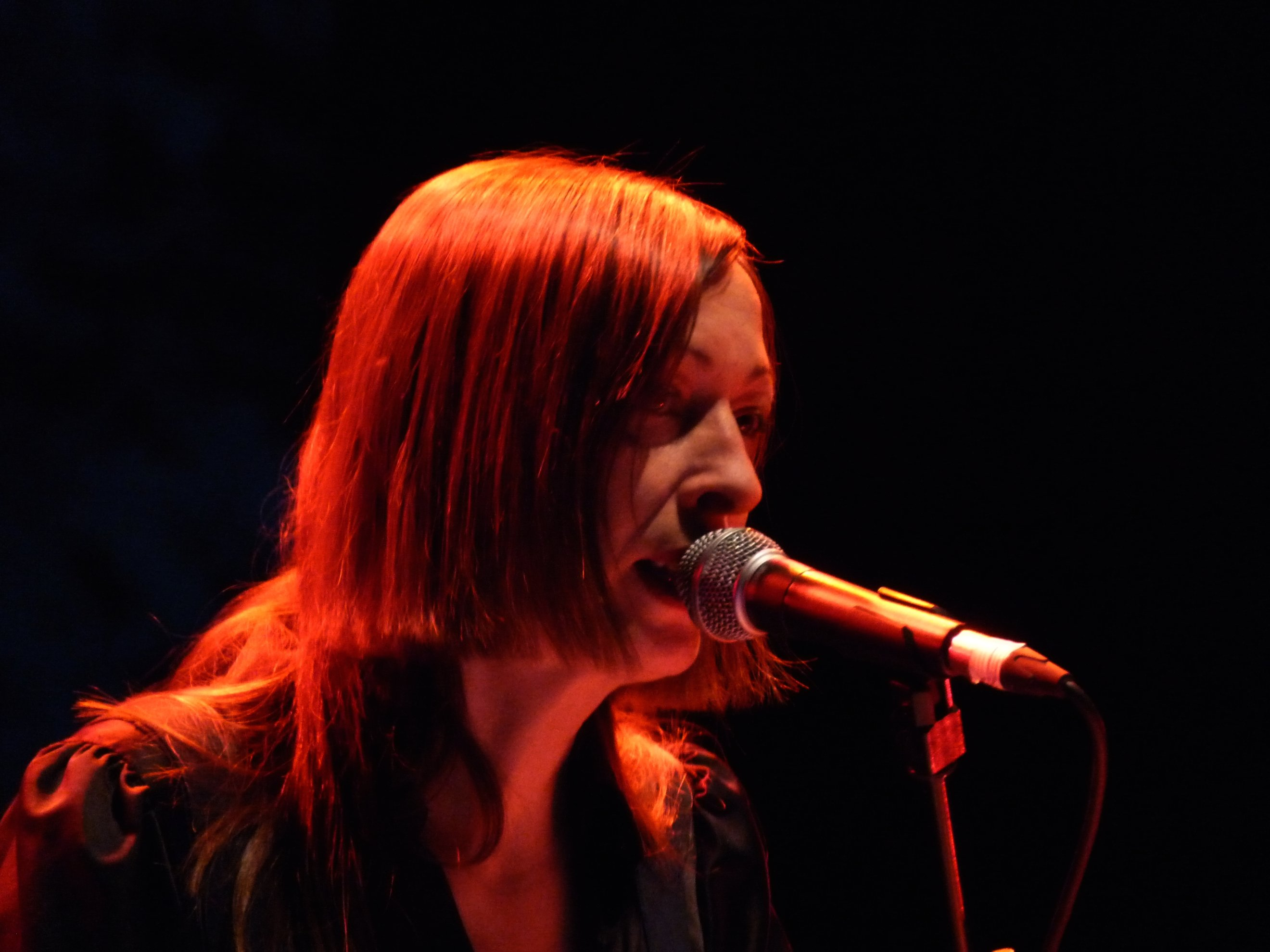
Gudrun Gut

- Charlotte Gainsbourg
- Diamanda Galas
- Anja Garbarek
- Merrill Garbus (Tune-Yards)
- Katie Geraghty (Koven)
- Stefani Joanne Angelina Germanotta (Lady Gaga)
- Alejandra Ghersi (Arca)
- Beth Gibbons (Portishead)
- Gillian Gilbert (New Order)
- Amber Giles (Mija)
- Miquette Giraudy
- Alice Glass (Crystal Castles)
- Alison Goldfrapp (Goldfrapp)
- Danielle Gooding (Flava D)
- Annie Gosfield
- Cary Grace
- Antye Greie (AGF)
- Ana Simina Grigoriu
- Beverly Grigsby
- Björk Guðmundsdóttir (Björk)
- Hildur Guðnadóttir
- Shilpa Gupta
- Gudrun Gut

== H ==
- Emily Haines
- Laurel Halo
- Ayumi Hamasaki
- Kathleen Hanna (Bikini Kill, Le Tigre, Julie Ruin)
- Elizabeth Vanessa Harper (Class Actress)
- Elizabeth Harris (Grouper)
- Anna-Catherine Hartley (Uffie)
- Miho Hatori (Cibo Matto)
- Sorrel Hays
- Jennifer Heaps (Imogen Heap)
- Heather Heart
- Helicopter Girl
- Mara Margaret Helmuth
- Holly Herndon
- Chloé Herry (Clozee)
- Caroline Hervé (Miss Kittin)
- Victoria Christina Hesketh (Little Boots)
- Clara Hill
- Joanne Judith-Mary Hill (Sydney Blu)
- Shelley Hirsch
- Mary Ann Hobbes
- Julia Holter
- Yuka Honda (Cibo Matto, Plastic Ono Band)
- Brenda Hutchinson

== I ==
- Susie Ibarra
- Jean Eichelberger Ivey
- Adina Izarra
- Ill-esha

== J ==
- Elly Jackson (La Roux)
- Samantha James
- Jane Jarboe (Jarboe)
- Joan Jeanrenaud
- Val Jeanty
- Kim Jin-hi
- Danielle Johnson (Computer Magic)
- Ema Jolly (Emika)
- Glynis Jones

== K ==
- KÁRYYN
- Yoko Kanno
- Nil Karaibrahimgil
- Laura Karpman
- Lydia Kavina
- Trish Keenan (Broadcast)
- Bevin Kelley (Blevin Blectum)
- Alicia Keys
- Natasha Khan (Bat for Lashes)
- Morgan Kibby
- Heidi Kilpeläinen (HK119)
- Mari Kimura
- Susanne Kirchmayr (Electric Indigo)
- Judy Klein
- Jutta Koether
- Merja Kokkonen (Islaja)
- Barbara Kolb
- Rachael Kozak (Hecate)
- Nina Kraviz
- Kateryna Kremko (Miss K8)
- Monika Kruse
- Christina Kubisch
- JoAnn Kuchera-Morin
- Pamelia Kurstin

== L ==
- Joan LaBarbara
- Anne LeBaron
- Anne LaBerge
- Martha Ladly (Martha and the Muffins, Associates)
- Daniela Lalita
- Jessy Lanza
- Elodie Lauten
- Jennifer Lee (TOKiMONSTA)
- Jonna Lee (iamamiwhoami)
- Kathy Yaeji Lee (Yaeji)
- Victoria Legrand (Beach House)
- Šarlote Lēnmane
- Annie Lennox (Eurythmics)
- Amelie Lens
- Tania Leon
- Jordana LeSesne (1.8.7)
- Elainie Lillios
- Annea Lockwood
- Paige Lopynski (BONNIE X CLYDE)
- Olivia Louvel
- Olivia Lufkin
- Anna Lunoe

== M ==
- Annie MacManus (Annie Mac)
- Georgia Magree (GG Magree)
- Kazu Makino (Blonde Redhead)
- Rekha Malhotra (DJ Rekha)
- Elizabeth Maniscalco (Elizabeth Rose)
- Helen Marnie (Ladytron)
- Carolina Márquez
- Josie Martin (Candyland)
- Miya Masaoka
- Riz Maslen (Neotropic)
- Sachiko Matsubara (Filament, I.S.O. ONJO)
- Keiko Matsui
- Kaffe Matthews
- Agathe Max
- Lauren Mayberry (CHVRCHES, Blue Sky Archives)
- Zia McCabe
- Linda McCartney
- Caralee McElroy (Cold Cave, Xiu Xiu)
- Christina McGeehan (RYAT)
- Priscilla McLean
- Cindy McTee
- Elle Mehrmand
- Rosa Menkman
- Micachu
- Takako Minekawa
- Maria Minerva
- Aira Mitsuki
- Kelela Mizanekristos (Kelela)
- Juana Molina
- Meredith Monk
- Charlotte Moorman (TV Cello)
- Barbara Morgenstern
- Nicole Morier (Electrocute)
- Ikue Mori
- Nicole Moudaber
- Blane Muise (Shygirl)
- Georgia Anne Muldrow
- Róisín Murphy
- Thea Musgrave

== N ==
- Yukimi Nagano (Little Dragon)
- Audrey Napoleon
- Laura Naukkarinen (Lau Nau)
- Amy X Neuburg
- Miriam Nervo (NERVO)
- Olivia Nervo (NERVO)
- Christine Newby (Cosey Fanni Tutti, Throbbing Gristle, Chris & Cosey)
- Dika Newlin
- Chelsea Nikkel (Princess Chelsea)
- Ninajirachi
- Merrill Beth Nisker (Peaches)
- Sarah Nixey
- Tujiko Noriko
- Doris Norton (Jacula)
- Jacqueline Nova

== O ==
- Jocy de Oliveira
- Pauline Oliveros
- Valerie Olukemi A "Kemi" Olusanya (Kemistry)
- Yoko Ono
- Daphne Oram
- Ela Orleans
- Ebony Naomi Oshunrinde (WondaGurl)
- Christine Ott
- Tera de Marez Oyens

== P ==
- Else Marie Pade
- Karin Park
- Andrea Parker (DJ)
- Elizabeth Parker (composer)
- Jennifer Parkin (Ayria)
- Zeena Parkins
- Chantal Passamonte (Mira Calix)
- Pastel Ghost (Vivian Moon)
- Maggi Payne
- Annette Peacock
- Sarah Peebles
- Hannah Peel
- Susan Philipsz
- Liz Phillips
- Elizabeth Hayden Pizer
- Lena Platonos
- Poe
- Andrea Polli
- Paula P-Orridge
- Valerie Anne Poxleitner (Lights)

== R ==
- Ruth Radelet (Chromatics)
- Éliane Radigue
- Teresa Rampazzi
- Maja Ratkje
- Honey Redmond (Miss Honey Dijon)
- Sally Johnston Reid
- Isabelle Rezazadeh (Rezz)
- Clara Rockmore
- Tara Rodgers
- Samantha Ronson
- Lucie Bigelow Rosen
- Marina Rosenfeld
- Lisa Dawn Rose-Wyatt (Lisa Lashes)
- Olesya Rostovskaya
- Anna Rubin
- Vivian Adelberg Rudow
- Jessica Rylan

== S ==
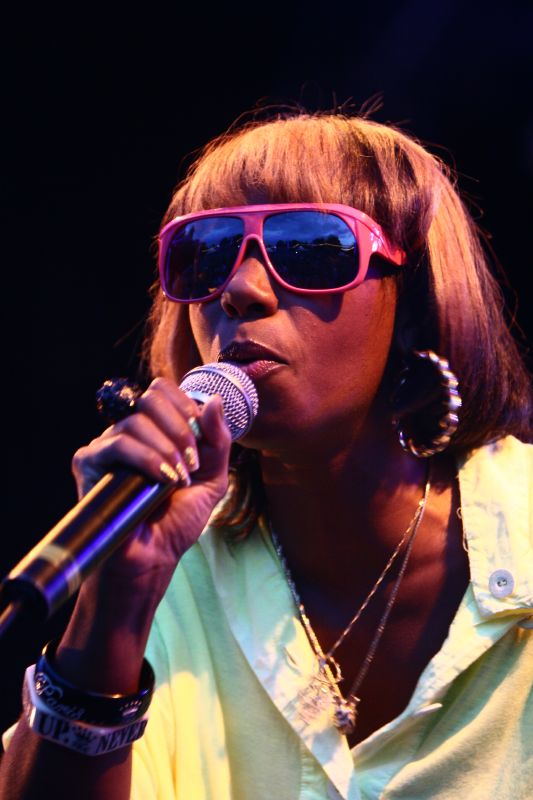
Santigold

- Kaija Saariaho
- Lætitia Sadier (Stereolab)
- JD Samson (Le Tigre)
- Charissa Saverio (DJ Rap)
- Carla Scaletti
- Polly Scattergood
- Marina Schiptjenko
- Cécile Schott (Colleen)
- Martha Schwendener (Bowery Electric)
- Daria Semegen
- Angela Seo (Xiu Xiu)
- Judith Shatin
- Lisa Shaw
- Ann Shenton (Add N to (X))
- Alice Shields
- Alexandra Sholler (Alison Wonderland)
- Kate Simko
- Émilie Simon
- Pril Smiley
- Kaitlyn Aurelia Smith
- Frida Sofía
- Laetitia Sonami
- Martina Sorbara (Dragonette)
- Laurie Spiegel
- Marea Stamper (The Blessed Madonna)
- Bev Stanton (Arthur Loves Plastic)
- Ivana Stefanović
- Lindsey Stirling
- Anne Lilia Berge Strand (Annie)
- Eliot Sumner (Vaal)
- Nicolette Suwoton (Nicolette)
- Kelly Sweet (HALIENE)

== T ==
- Hild Sofie Tafjord
- Mari Takano
- Anna Virginia Taylor (Anna Domino)
- Fiorella Terenzi
- Terre Thaemlitz
- Diane Thome
- Ebony Thomas (Ebony Bones)
- Lynda Thomas
- Tracey Thorn (Everything but the Girl)
- Lysa Aya Trenier
- Noriko Tsujiko (Tujiko Noriko)
- Cosey Fanni Tutti
- TĀLĀ

== U ==
- Hiromi Uehara
- Ludmila Ulehla

== V ==
- Kristín Anna Valtýsdóttir (múm, Avey Tare & Kría Brekkan)
- Lois V Vierk
- Sarine Voltage

== W ==
- Shirley Walker
- Victoria Beverley Walker (Pinkpantheress)
- Jennifer Walshe
- Alana Watson (NERO)
- Amanda Lucille Warner (MNDR)
- Hildegard Westerkamp
- Tina Weymouth (Tom Tom Club, Talking Heads)
- Ruth White
- Santi White (Santigold)
- Julia Wolfe
- Erykah Wright (Erykah Badu)

== X ==
- Ramona Andra Xavier (Vektroid, Macintosh Plus, New Dreams Ltd, PrismCorp, Laserdisc Visions, 情報デスクVIRTUAL, Sacred Tapestry, Fuji Grid TV, esc 不在, Tanning Salon, dstnt, Vektordrum)
- Sophie Xeon (Sophie)

== Y ==
- Akiko Yano
- Toko Yasuda (St. Vincent)
- Meredith Yayanos
- Yoshimi Yokota (Yoshimi P-We) (Boredoms, OOIOO, OLAibi)
- Ami Yoshida
- suGar Yoshinaga (Buffalo Daughter)
- Gayle Young

== Z ==
- Laurie Z
- Pamela Z
- Kateryna Zavoloka (Zavoloka)
- Marian Zazeela
