= Walpurgis Rites – Hexenwahn =

Walpurgis Rites - Hexenwahn

Studio album by Belphegor
- Released: 9 October 2009
- Recorded: Stage One Studios, Berlin, Germany & Stage One Studios, Kassel, Germany
- Genre: Blackened death metal
- Length: 39:23
- Label: Nuclear Blast
- Producer: Andy Classen, Belphegor

Belphegor chronology
Bondage Goat Zombie (2008)	Walpurgis Rites - Hexenwahn (2009)	Blood Magick Necromance (2011)

Professional ratings
Review scores
Source	Rating
About.com	3.5/5 stars
Allmusic	3.5/5 stars
Blabbermouth	8/10 stars

Walpurgis Rites – Hexenwahn is the eighth studio album by the Austrian blackened death metal band Belphegor. It was released in 2009 on Nuclear Blast Records (their third for the label).

Like its predecessors, Pestapokalypse VI and Bondage Goat Zombie, the album was recorded and produced with German producer Andy Classen. On 25 August the band made the song "Walpurgis Rites" available for streaming on their Myspace page along with the lyrics on their website. As of 1 October the video for 'Der Geisterstreiber' is now available.

== Track listing ==
No.	Title	Lyrics	Music	Length
1.	"Walpurgis Rites"	Helmuth Lehner	Helmuth	3:09
2.	"Veneratio Diaboli - I Am Sin"	Hecate, Helmuth	Helmuth, Serpenth	7:02
3.	"Hail the New Flesh"	Aegathis, Helmuth	Helmuth	5:32
4.	"Reichswehr in Blood"	Pagan Meggido, Helmuth	Helmuth	4:36
5.	"The Crosses Made of Bone"	Pagan Meggido	Helmuth, Serpenth	4:26
6.	"Der Geistertreiber"	Barth, Helmuth	Helmuth	3:41
7.	"Destroyer Hekate"	Hecate	Helmuth, Serpenth	3:37
8.	"Enthralled Toxic Sabbat"	Hecate	Helmuth	4:33
9.	"Hexenwahn - Totenkult"	Helmuth	Helmuth	2:44
Total length:				39:23

== Personnel ==
Belphegor

- Helmuth Lehner - vocals, guitars, samples, lyrics
- Serpenth - bass guitar, samples
- Morluch - guitars

Additional musicians

- Rachael Hecate - vocals, lyrics
- Andy Classen - samples
- Tomasz "Nefastus" Janiszewski - drums

Production

- Anthony "Aegathis" Paulini - lyrics
- Rachael "Hecate" Kozak - lyrics
- Bartholomäus "Barth" Resch - lyrics
- Pagan Meggido - lyrics
- Marcelo Henrique "Marcelo HVC" Vasco - artwork
- Gerd Andraschko - photography
- Andy Classen - producer, mixing, mastering

Note

- Recorded at Stage One Studio in Berlin, Germany, between January and July 2009.

== Charts ==
Chart (2009)	Peak position
Austrian Albums Chart	60
German Albums Chart	99

== Release history ==
Formats	Region	Date	Label
CD, LP, digital download	Europe	October 9, 2009	Nuclear Blast
CD, LP, digital download	Russia	October 9, 2009	Irond Records
CD, LP, digital download	North America	20 October 2009	Nuclear Blast
