= Necrodaemon Terrorsathan =

Studio album by Belphegor
- Released: 17 May 2000
- Genre: Blackened death metal
- Length: 35:29
- Label: Last Episode
- Producer: Boban Milunovic

Belphegor chronology
Blutsabbath (1997)	Necrodaemon Terrorsathan (2000)	Lucifer Incestus (2003)

Professional ratings
Review scores
Source	Rating
Chronicles of Chaos	8.5/10 stars

Necrodaemon Terrorsathan is the third studio album by the Austrian blackened death metal band Belphegor.

Pope John Paul II is implicitly referenced in one line of the lyrics to the track "Cremation of Holiness".

== Track listing ==
All music composed and lyrics written by Helmuth Lehner and Sigurd Hagenauer.

1. "Necrodaemon Terrorsathan" – 4:48
2. "Vomit upon the Cross" – 4:11
3. "Diabolical Possession" – 4:49
4. "Lust Perishes in a Thirst for Blood" – 3:53
5. "S.B.S.R." – 4:00
6. "Sadism Unbound / Lechery on the Altar" – 3:34
7. "Tanzwut Totengesänge" – 3:18
8. "Cremation of Holiness" – 3:40
9. "Necrodaemon Terrorsathan Pt. II / Analjesus (Outro)" – 3:16

== Personnel ==
Belphegor

- Helmuth Lehner – vocals, guitars
- Sigurd Hagenauer – guitars
- Mario "Marius" Klausner – bass, vocals

Additional musicians

- Man Gandler – drums
- Günther "Gü" Wutzl – synthesizer

Production

- Boban Milunovic – producer, mastering
- Reinhard Brunner – mastering
- Karl-Heinz Schuster – layout
- Joe Wimmer – photography
- Recorded at Noise Art Studios in Wels, Austria in October 1999 – February 2000.
- Mastered at ATS Studio in Mölln, Austria.
