= Bondage Goat Zombie =

Studio album by Belphegor
- Released: 15 April 2008
- Genre: Blackened death metal
- Length: 39:45
- Label: Nuclear Blast
- Producer: Andy Classen

Belphegor chronology
Pestapokalypse VI (2006)	Bondage Goat Zombie (2008)	Walpurgis Rites - Hexenwahn (2009)

Professional ratings
Review scores
Source	Rating
About.com	4/5 stars
Allmusic	3.5/5 stars
Blabbermouth	8/10 stars
Chronicles of Chaos	5/10 stars

Bondage Goat Zombie is the seventh studio album by the Austrian blackened death metal band Belphegor. Artwork by Ralph Manfreda. It is the first album to feature bassist Serpenth.

Some of the tracks deal with the writings of the Marquis de Sade. The album was, like its predecessor, Pestapokalypse VI, recorded and produced with German producer Andy Classen. The album leaked onto P2P file sharing networks on 17 March 2008. Hecate provided lyrics on track 7.

== Track listing ==
No.	Title	Lyrics	Music	Length
1.	"Bondage Goat Zombie"	Helmuth	Helmuth, Serpenth	3:59
2.	"Stigma Diabolicum"	Megan Leo	Helmuth	5:01
3.	"Armageddon's Raid"	Helmuth	Helmuth	5:07
4.	"Justine: Soaked in Blood"	Barth	Helmuth, Torturer	4:07
5.	"Sexdictator Lucifer"	Helmuth	Helmuth	3:43
6.	"Shred for Sathan"	Helmuth	Helmuth	3:47
7.	"Chronicles of Crime"	Hecate	Helmuth, Serpenth	5:32
8.	"The Sukkubus Lustrate"	Helmuth	Helmuth	2:56
9.	"Der Rutenmarsch"	Helmuth	Helmuth	5:32
Total length:				39:45

Special edition DVD
No.	Title	Length
1.	"Bondage Goat Zombie (Video Clip)"
2.	"The Who & The Bunker (Impressions Of The Video Shooting)"
3.	"The Root Of All Evil (Rehearsal Room)"
4.	"Shredding Stage One (Studio Impressions)"
5.	"Einmarsch (Live Impressions 2007)"
6.	"Belphegor Maniakks"

== Personnel ==
Belphegor

- Helmuth Lehner - vocals, guitars, lyrics
- Serpenth - bass guitar

Additional musicians

- Florian "Torturer" Klein - drums

Production

- Bartholomäus "Barth" Resch - lyrics
- Andy Classen - producer, engineering, mixing, mastering
- Ralph Manfreda - artwork, cover art, graphics, photography
- Joe Wimmer - photography
- Megan Leo - lyrics
- Rachael "Hecate" Kozak - lyrics

Note

- Produced, engineered, mixed and mastered at Stage One Studios
  in Kassel, Germany, between November 2007 and January 2008.

== "Bondage Goat Zombie" ==
"Bondage Goat Zombie" is the first single by Belphegor. It was released on 22 February 2008, by Nuclear Blast.

=== Track listing ===
No.	Title	Lyrics	Music	Length
1.	"Bondage Goat Zombie"	Helmuth	Helmuth, Serpenth	04:01

== Charts ==
Chart (2008)	Peak position
Austrian Albums Chart	42
German Albums Chart	81

== Release history ==
Formats	Region	Date	Label
CD, CD+DVD, LP, digital download	Europe	April 15, 2008	Nuclear Blast
CD, CD+DVD, LP, digital download	North America	April 15, 2008	Nuclear Blast
CD, CD+DVD, LP, digital download	Russia	11 April 2008	Irond Records
