= Blood Magick Necromance =

Studio album by Belphegor
- Released: 14 January 2011
- Recorded: June–October 2010, Abyss Studio Pärlby Sweden
- Genre: Blackened death metal
- Length: 40:42
- Label: Nuclear Blast
- Producer: Peter Tägtgren

Belphegor chronology
| Walpurgis Rites - Hexenwahn (2009) | Blood Magick Necromance (2011) | Conjuring the Dead (2014) |

Alternative cover
- Censored cover version

Professional ratings
Review scores
| Source | Rating |
|---|---|
| About.com | 2.5/5 stars |
| Exclaim! | Mixed |
| Chronicles of Chaos | 8/10 stars |

Blood Magick Necromance is the ninth studio album by the Austrian blackened death metal band Belphegor. It was released on 14 January 2011 through Nuclear Blast. The album was recorded by Peter Tägtgren at Abyss Studios in Sweden.

Music videos were shot for "Impaled Upon the Tongue of Sathan" and "In Blood - Devour This Sanctity", directed by Alexander Koenig and Andrey Kovalev, respectively. The album features cover art by Joachim Luetke who previously worked with Arch Enemy, Dimmu Borgir and Kreator among others.

== Track listing ==
| No. | Title | Lyrics | Music | Length |
|---|---|---|---|---|
| 1. | "In Blood - Devour This Sanctity" | Helmuth, Rachael "Hecate" Kozak | Helmuth, Serpenth | 5:31 |
| 2. | "Rise to Fall and Fall to Rise" | Helmuth, Pagan Megan | Helmuth, Serpenth | 6:01 |
| 3. | "Blood Magick Necromance" | Helmuth, Rachael "Hecate" Kozak | Helmuth | 7:00 |
| 4. | "Discipline Through Punishment" | Helmuth | Helmuth | 4:05 |
| 5. | "Angeli Mortis De Profundis" | Helmuth | Helmuth, Serpenth | 3:00 |
| 6. | "Impaled Upon the Tongue of Sathan" | Helmuth, Mr. Blood Seraph | Helmuth | 5:42 |
| 7. | "Possessed Burning Eyes" | Helmuth, Sigurd | Helmuth, Serpenth | 5:33 |
| 8. | "Sado Messiah" | Helmuth, Rachael "Hecate" Kozak | Helmuth | 3:50 |
| Total length: | | | | 40:42 |

== Personnel ==
Belphegor

- Helmuth Lehner - vocals, guitars, bass guitar
- Serpenth - bass guitar, vocals

Additional musicians

- Rachael "Hecate" Kozak - whispering (on "Blood Magick Necromance")
- Meri Tadić - violin
- Norwin Palme - keyboards, orchestration
- Sebastian Lanser - keyboards
- Martin "Marthyn" Jovanović - drums

Production

- Jenn Sky - booklet goat photo
- Gerd Andraschko - additional band photo
- Joachim Luetke - artwork, design, graphics
- Jonas Kjellgren - mastering
- Peter Tägtgren - producer, engineering
- Helmut Wolech - artwork, photography

Notes

- Recorded at Abyss Studios in Sweden between June and October 2010.
- Mastered at Blacklounge Studios in Sweden.

== Charts ==
| Chart (2011) | Peak position |
|---|---|
| Austrian Albums Chart | 39 |
| German Albums Chart | 97 |
| US Top Heatseekers (Billboard) | 48 |

== Release history ==
| Formats | Region | Date | Label |
|---|---|---|---|
| CD, LP, digital download | Europe | 14 January 2011 | Nuclear Blast |
| CD, LP, digital download | Russia | 14 January 2011 | Irond Records |
| CD, LP, digital download | North America | 8 February 2011 | Nuclear Blast |
