= Paroxsihzem =

- Origin: Toronto, Canada
- Genres: Death metal
- Years active: 2007
- Labels: Dark Descent Records; Hellthrasher Productions; Vault of Dried Bones; Krucyator Productions
- Members: Krag, Impugnor, Abyss, Abhorr, Subjugator
- Website: Official website

Paroxsihzem is a Canadian death metal band, formed in 2007.

== Biography ==
Paroxsihzem recorded in 2009 a demo called "Aesthetic Torture", self released.

In 2010, the band recorded and released its first album, called "Paroxsihzem", which was re-released in 2012 on CD by Dark Descent Records, on vinyl by Hellthrasher Productions, and on tape by Krucyator Productions.

In 2014, Paroxsihzem shared a split album called "Warpit of Coiling Atrocities", with Canadian death metal band Adversarial, released on CD by Vault of Dried Bones.

In 2016, the band released the EP "Abyss of Excruciating Vexes", released on CD and vinyl by Hellthrasher Productions, and on tape by Krucyator Productions. The band covered the song "Dead Cunt Maniac", originally recorded by Arkhon Infaustus.

== Members ==
- Krag – Vocals
- Impugnor – Guitars, Vocals
- Abyss – Drums
- Subjugator - Bass

== Discography ==
- Paroxsihzem (2010)
- Warpit of Coiling Atrocities (2014)
- Abyss of Excruciating Vexess (2016)
