= Pizer =

Pizer (also, Peizer) is a surname. Notable people with the surname include:

- Donald Pizer (1929–2023), American academic and literary critic
- Dorothy Pizer (c. 1906–1964), British activist
- Elizabeth Hayden Pizer (born 1954), American composer, music journalist, archivist and broadcast producer
- John Pizer (c.1850–1897), Polish Jew bootmaker
- Marjorie Pizer (1920–2016), Australian poet
- Terren Peizer (born 1959), American businessperson convicted of insider trading and securities fraud

== See also ==
- Pfizer
