= Goatreich – Fleshcult =

Goatreich - Fleshcult

Studio album by Belphegor
- Released: 28 February 2005
- Recorded: Master Sound Studio, September–November 2004
- Genre: Blackened death metal
- Length: 41:21
- Label: Napalm
- Producer: Alexander Krull, Helmuth Lehner

Belphegor chronology
Lucifer Incestus (2003)	Goatreich - Fleshcult (2005)	Pestapokalypse VI (2006)

Professional ratings
Review scores
Source	Rating
Chronicles of Chaos	6/10 stars
Exclaim!	Mixed

Goatreich – Fleshcult is the fifth studio album by the Austrian blackened death metal band Belphegor. It was released in 2005.

This was the album to feature the fully developed and recorded "Swarm of Rats", which had existed at least as early as 2002 and was featured on Infernal Live Orgasm.

== Track listing ==
No.	Title	Lyrics	Music	Length
1.	"The Cruzifixus - Anus Dei"	Helmuth Lehner	Helmuth Lehner	4:16
2.	"Bleeding Salvation"	Sigurd Hagenauer	Helmuth Lehner	3:48
3.	"Fornicationium et Immundus Diabolus"	Helmuth Lehner, Nasko	Helmuth Lehner, Bartholomäus Resch	3:00
4.	"Sepulture of Hypocrisy"			4:58
5.	"Goatreich – Fleshcult"	Bartholomäus Resch, Helmuth Lehner	Helmuth Lehner, Florian Klein	3:25
6.	"Swarm of Rats"	Helmuth Lehner, Sigurd Hagenauer	Helmuth Lehner, Sigurd Hagenauer	4:54
7.	"Kings Shall Be Kings"	Bartholomäus Resch	Helmuth Lehner	4:59
8.	"The Crown Massacre"	Helmuth Lehner	Helmuth Lehner	3:01
9.	"Festum Asinorum / Chapter 2"	Bartholomäus Resch (inspired by G. Zacharias)	Helmuth Lehner	5:53
10.	"Heresy of Fire" [bonus]"			3:08
Total length:				44:29

== Personnel ==
Belphegor

- Helmuth Lehner - vocals, guitars
- Sigurd Hagenauer - guitars
- Bartholomäus "Barth" Resch - bass

Additional musicians

- Florian "Torturer" Klein - drums
- Mathias "der Hexer" Röderer - synthesizers

Production

- Alexander Krull - recording, mixing, engineer, mastering, producer
- Helmuth - producer
- Martin Schmidt, Mathias Röderer, Thorsten Bauer - engineer assistant
- Monsieur Morbid a.k.a. Ralph-allus Manfreda - cover design
- Mr. Ron Morisson - photography

Note

- Recorded, engineered, mixed and mastered at Master Sound Studio September–November 2004.

== Release history ==
Formats	Region	Date	Label
CD, LP, digital download	Europe	28 February 2005	Napalm Records
CD, LP, digital download	Russia	5 April 2005	Irond Records
