= Asmodeus (band) =

- Origin: Austria
- Genre: Black metal
- Years active: 1996–present
- Label: Talheim Records
- Members: Tyr; Desdemon; Malthus; Azazel
- Past members: Ashrak; Lestat; Dargoth; Harth; Naroth; Malthus; Garm
- Website: Official Site

Asmodeus is an Austrian black metal band founded in 1996.

== History ==
Tyr and Desdemon began the band as Diabolus. After assembling the first permanent line up, the name was changed to Asmodeus.

In 1998, Tyr (guitars), Desdemon (bass, vocals), Dargoth (guitars), and Harth (drums) recorded the demo Supreme Surrender. Harth and Dargoth left the band, and were replaced with Lestat (guitars) and Ashrak (drums). After their first shows in Austria, Asmodeus recorded their second demo, As the Winter Moon Bleeds.

The group toured with Satyricon, Behemoth, Hecate Enthroned and Rebaelliun, becoming popular in the black metal underground. In November 2000, the third demo was recorded and released. Lestat left the band, and Naroth joined as the new guitarist.

Phalanx Inferna, Asmodeus' first full-length album, was released via Twilight Records. Due to positive response, Asmodeus performed at a variety of national and international concerts in 2004. In April 2005, the first European tour took place with Belphegor, Arkhon Infaustus, and In Aeternum. Naroth left the band and Azazel replaced him. Following the tour, Ashrak left the band. A search for new members began, and in October 2005, they recruited drummer Malthus. Asmodeus recorded Imperium Damnatum with T.T. of Abigor in December 2005 at Infinite Sounds Studios.

Their album Adamant was released on Talheim Records.

== Band members ==
=== Current ===
- Tyr – guitars (1996–present)
- Desdemona – bass, vocals (1996–present)
- Azalea – guitars (2006–2009, 2012–present; touring 2005–2006)
- Nordger – drums (2010–present)

=== Former ===
- Harth – drums (1996–1999)
- Dargoth – guitars (1996–1999)
- Ashram – drums (1999–2005)
- Lestat – guitars, backing vocals (1999–2002)
- Naroth – guitars (2002–2005)
- Malthus – drums (2005–2010)
- Garm – guitars (2010–2012)

== Discography ==
=== Studio albums ===
- Phalanx Inferna (2003)
- Imperium Damnatum (2006)
- Adamant (2018)

=== Compilations ===
- Twilight Sampler (2006)
