= Hecate (musician) =

American singer

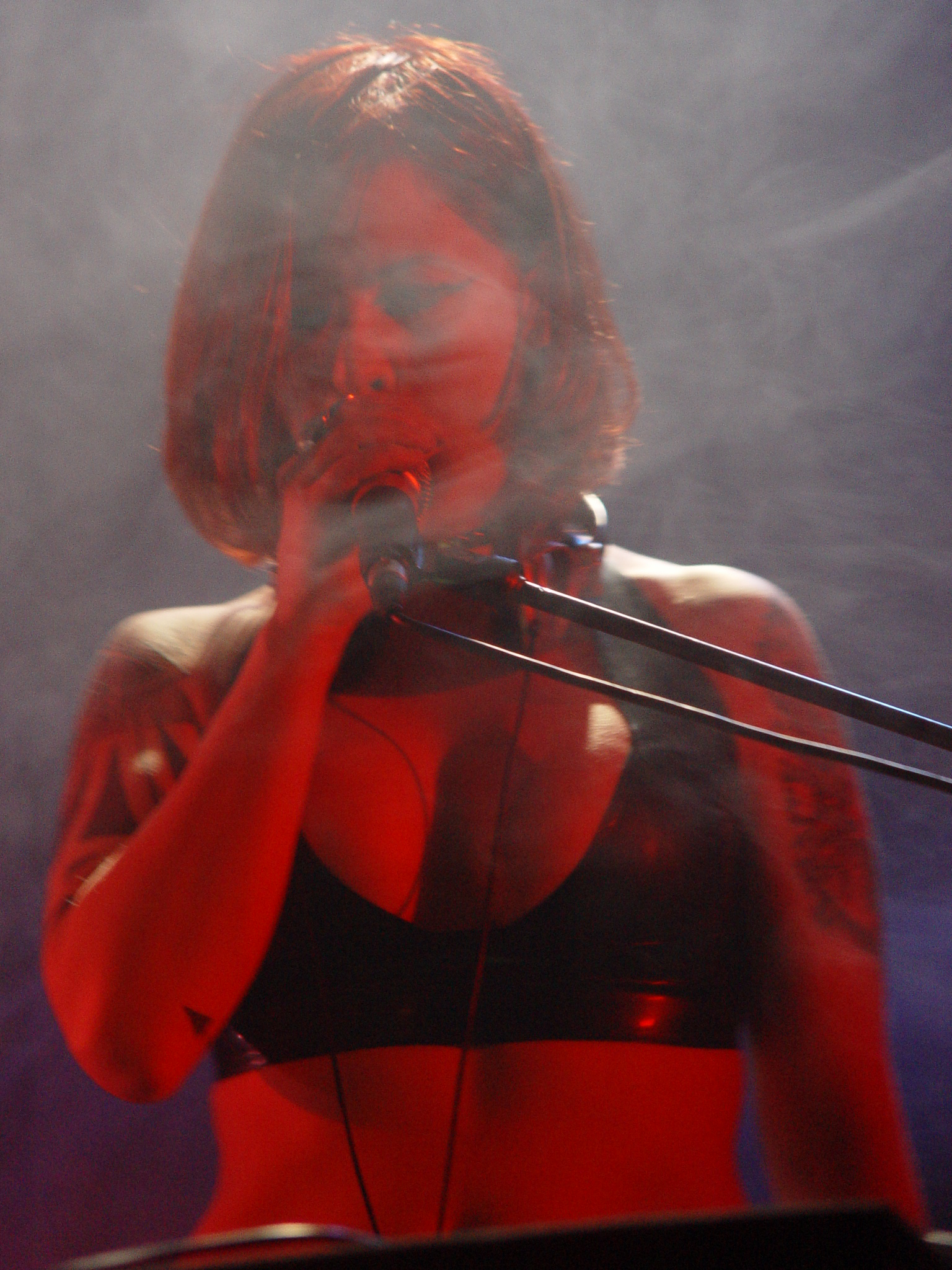
- Hecate in 2006

Background information
- Born: Rachael Kozak; May 26, 1976 (age 50)
- Origin: Detroit, Michigan, U.S.
- Genres: Breakcore, darkcore, black metal
- Occupations: Singer, producer
- Years active: 1994–present
- Label: Zhark International

Rachael Lynn Gabriela Kozak-Salmi (born May 26, 1976), better known by her stage name Hecate, is an American experimental industrial and breakcore musician based in Vienna. Her stage name originates from Hecate, the Greek goddess of sorcery.

With a career spanning over 20 years and more than 30 releases, she is considered a prolific female producer of dark underground electronic music. She co-founded Zhark Recordings with Kareem in 1996, before parting ways and continuing her share of the label as Zhark London/Zhark International. The label was a response to the lack of outlets for non-mainstream and underground electronic artists. Mixing hardcore electronica with heavy metal, her solo releases include the 2006 album Brew Hideous, described by Exclaim! author Laura Taylor as "a hellish soundtrack to an old, real-life horror".

The 2003 release Nymphomatriarch with Venetian Snares was controversial. The album consisted of synthesised recordings of them having intercourse. Hecate later spoke out about the sexism and erasure of her contribution that she endured after the release.

In 1998, Hecate founded Homewrecker Recordings (a.k.a. The Homewrecker Foundation), an all-female electronic label she described as "born of want". The label shut down in 2001. Hecate stating that although she would always encourage female talent in the genre, "you can lead a horse to water but you can't make them drink".

After an absence from her Hecate persona, she returned in 2017 with two collaborations: 'Absolution' with Instinct Primal and 'Final Planet 666' with Der Blutharsch and the Infinite Hand of the Leading Path.

Outside music, Hecate is a multidisciplinary artist. Her works include large-scale paintings, illustrations, ceramic sculptures, screen printed clothing and mixed media montage. Her first exhibition was at SMart Café in Vienna, May 2014. As a performance artist, she has appeared in Belphegor's 2010 music video "Impaled Upon the Tongue of Satan" and Daniel Vrangsinn's 2011 video project Taboo.

== As a musician ==
=== As Hecate ===
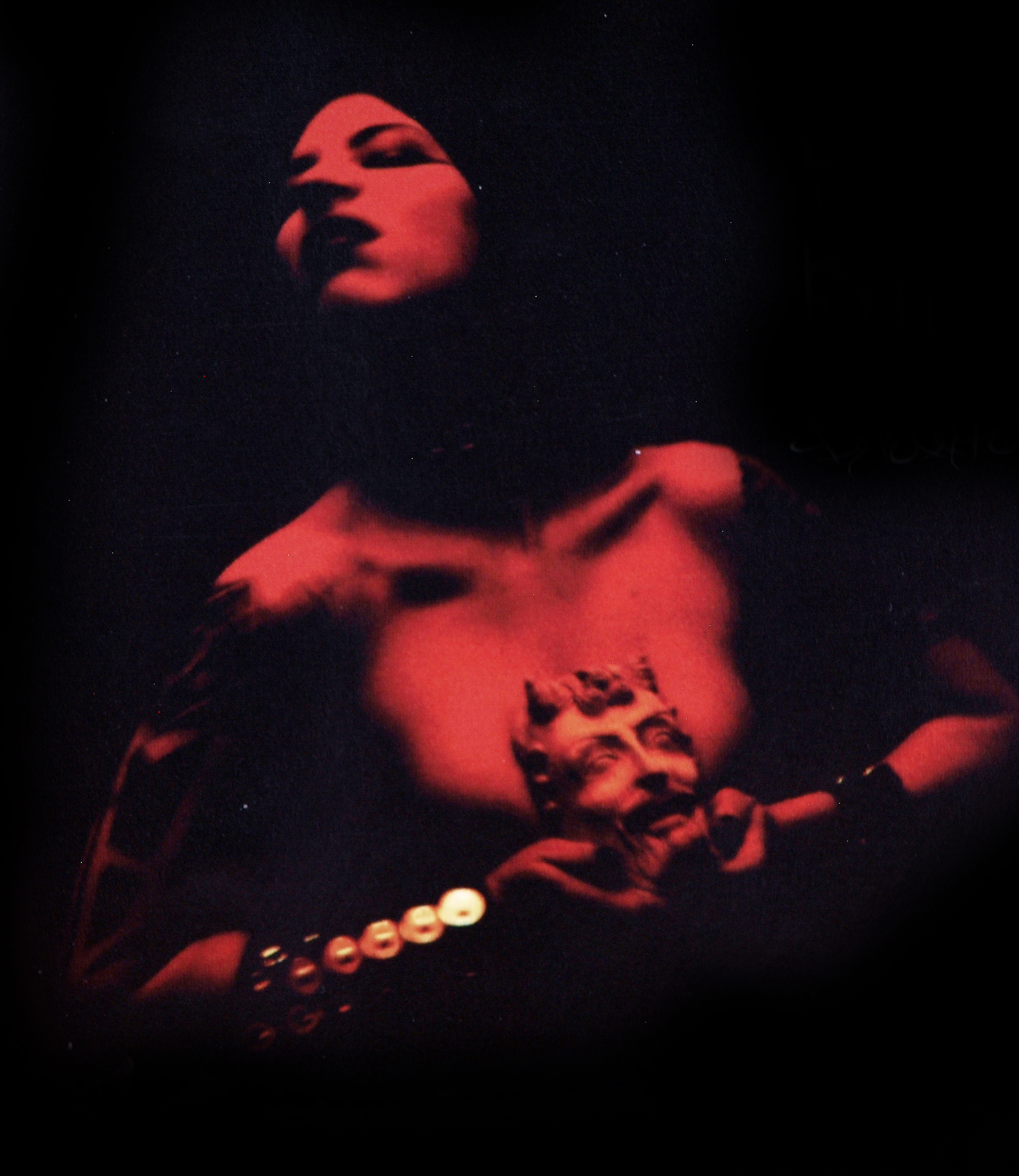
Hecate in 2006

After forming Zhark Recordings in 1996, two collaborations with DJ Kareem appeared on 7" vinyl, In the Bush and The Payback. Besides the 1997 cassette-tape-only release Pay for Protection (via Kool.POP), the records were the first major appearances of the Hecate persona.

From there, she released her solo material, beginning with 1998's Hate Cats on 12". The following year, she released Negative World Status as a 12" black vinyl and a limited edition dark pink vinyl, limited to 500 copies. The EP was well received. A UHT article stated, "Pray to die before becomes real what this music is trying to describe you! Masterpiece in the genre! [sic]".

Hecate released her first full-length LP in 2001, The Magick of Female Ejaculation, on double 12" and compact disc. The vinyl edition contained eleven tracks; the CD contained four bonus tracks. The press release for the LP described it as "eleven channels on a journey through the female psyche experienced through the eyes and ears of Hecate". With themes of love, life, sex and death, Hecate listed The Marquis De Sade as an influence. The ninth track features Hecate reading the opening paragraph of Philosophy in the Bedroom (La philosophie dans le Boudoir).

A string of LP and EP releases followed. Her next full-length, Ascension Chamber, came out in 2003. Another double 12"/CD release, the ten tracks correspond to the ten sephiroths of the Qabalah. Hecate created the cover artwork and gatefold painting. She later confessed that it was one of the few Hecate releases with tracks that could be described as "uplifting" due to the gentle nature of "Kether" and "Chesed". Terrorizer Magazine praised the sound: "While listening to Hecate's 'Ascension Chamber' you could swear blind that it's being used as a portal for her devious demons to enter your realm and screw with the sounds of the universe. The depth and structure to the tracks is awesome, you think you can recognise sounds, but then they blend and bleed into another forever transforming and mutating, changing the very essence of the tunes. Outstanding."

In 2004, she released Seven Veils of Silence, a concept album described as "a sonic storytelling of Salome". The album was released as a 12" with bonus 7" and later issued on CD. The album was praised for its use of atmospheric Middle Eastern music and departure from breakcore. An IGLOO review stated, "It doesn't sound breakcore (sic) anymore, there are only some jungle breaks here and there but they don't affect the dark rarefied atmosphere of the album. There are a lot of oriental influences instead, like horns, chants and percussions, mixed with buzzing bass and clicky electronics. The overall sound is gloomy, menacing and claustrophobic, emphasized by the apocalyptical landscape of the artwork. Seven Veils of Silence defines a genre on its own."

Returning to her roots in 2005, Hecate released the limited special mini LP Wholesale Massacre of All Identifiable Replicas on clear 12" vinyl. The sleeve was hand-screened inside and outside, along with individual hand numbering. A total of 499 copies were released. Delving into drug abuse and twisted love, William S. Burroughs's Naked Lunch was cited as an inspiration alongside her personal experiences.

The 2006 album Brew Hideous received critical acclaim in dark music media, owing to its infusion of electronic music with black metal. The cover artwork and new logo paid homage to the black metal genre. This was the beginning of Hecate's collaboration with Belphegor. The album tells the story of a witches' coven and their punishment. Brew Hideous is "A journey into the heart of darkness and a bewildering sustained release of menace", according to Terrorizer's Jonathan Selzer. Cue Mix Magazine hailed the record as one of her best.

Brew Hideous - The Remixes was released in 2011 via Ad Noiseam and featured contributions from White Darkness, Amboss, Vile Enginez and Slutmachine.

=== On tour as Hecate ===
Hecate has toured extensively and been invited to play in the USA, Europe, South America, and Russia. Hecate has also DJ'ed in Japan. Having toured the country in 2008 alongside members of UTEROZZZAAA, she was invited in 2017 by U Hang No Da. Their time together was dubbed the "Ultimate Stalked Tour". Hecate has expressed a personal love of the country.

In a 2013 interview with USBMS, Hecate recalled her "intense" stay in Bogotá, Colombia, in 2008, where she played at an all-female prison. She described the show as "the absolute height of emotion I ever experienced while playing!" Over 500 inmates attended.

In 2014, documentary footage of the Zhark International Abomination of Desolation Tour was officially released. Filmed in 2005, the tour went around Europe, featuring Abelcain, Xanopticon, Val and Hecate. The tour coincided with the death of Pope John Paul II, fuelling the esoteric spirit found in Zhark releases.

According to her official website, Hecate has "invaded" the US, Canada, Mexico, Colombia, Ukraine, Russia, United Kingdom, Japan, Sweden, Germany, Austria, France, Italy, Switzerland, Belgium, The Netherlands, Spain, Latvia and Finland.

=== As Raquel de Grimstone ===
In 2002, Hecate adopted the persona of Raquel de Grimstone to explore and expand her vocal abilities, which were not in keeping with the Hecate sound. The project released the album FreeMansonicYouth. Unlike other works, the album was released only on compact disc, although six tracks were previously released in a trilogy of 7" vinyls. "Venom Bytes" was released on her sub-label The Homewrecker Foundation, while the album came out as a full Zhark International release.

== Influences and collaborations ==
Kozak appreciates the 1980s metal featured on Headbangers Ball, black metal, Bong-Ra, Xanopticon, Franco Battiato, Pain Teens, King Crimson and Urfaust, amongst others. She has collaborated with Venetian Snares, Lustmord, Abelcain, Christoph Fringeli, and Michael Ford of Black Funeral. She worked with Austrian Blackened Death Metal band Belphegor on five LPs (see below).

=== Collaboration with Belphegor ===
Belphegor is an extreme metal band from Salzburg, Austria. Hecate met the band after they moved to Nuclear Blast. During this time, the band began work on Pestapokalypse VI, released in 2006. She contributed to the outro sound collage on Das Pesthaus / Miasma Epilog (specifically the 'Miasma' portion).

This collaboration led to further work in later releases. Hecate's history with the band is as follows:

Pestapokalypse VI (2006)

- Outro sound collage on Das Pesthaus / Miasma Epilog

Bondage Goat Zombie (2008)

- Lyricist for Chronicles of Crime
- "Sukkubus" Screams/Samples on Sex Dictator Lucifer and Der Rutenmarsch

Walpurgis Rites – Hexenwahn (2009) Nominated for the Austrian Amadeus Award 2010

- Lyricist on Enthralled Toxic Sabbat and Destroyer Hekate
- Screams on Hexenwahn - Totenkult

Blood Magick Necromance (2010)

- Lyricist for In Blood - Devour This Sanctity, Blood Magick Necromance and Sado Messiah
- Whispering on Blood Magick Necromance
- Performance artist in the official video for Impaled Upon the Tongue of Satan
- Cover model for the album artwork
- Acting Press Secretary for the release
- "Stage Sukkubus" - On-stage dance/performance with the band in front of 10,000 people.

Conjuring the Dead (2015)

- Lyricist for Gas Mask Terror and Conjuring The Dead

=== Absolution with Instinct Primal ===
In March 2017, the Hecate persona returned on Absolution, a limited edition orange cassette tape featuring two original ambient tracks ("Mourning Sickness" and Majesty Lykania") remixed by Instinct Primal. This special release was limited to 50 hand numbered copies. It was released on Nova Alternative label on March 11, 2017.

=== Final Planet 666 with Der Blutharsch ===
Hecate collaborated on the limited edition flexi disc Final Planet 666. Recorded in Vienna almost three years before release, the track is a joint recording between Hecate and Der Blutharsch and the Infinite Hand of the Leading Path.

Hecate contributed beats and layered vocals, while musician Albin Julius added synths. Marthynna's vocals were used. In the official Rachael Kozak blog, she states that "this four minute piece might be the ultimate soundtrack to a space vampire invasion upon a sweat drenched dancefloor".

A total of 44 copies were produced, which sold out in one day.

The supporting music video for the track was uploaded to YouTube on January 16, 2018. The video was a collaboration with members of Der Blutharsch. It was shot in Kuopio, Finland.

Final Planet 666 was featured in the documentary Iron Man of the North, which premiered at the Wipe Film Festival in Berlin.

== Pentagram Studio ==
=== As Head of Pentagram Studio ===
Hecate returned to Austria from Finland to begin work on Pentagram Studio, officially established in January 2020, in Vienna's Fifth District. Serving as a showroom and a creative space, the studio is decorated with Hecate's artwork, including paintings, customised furniture, and handmade glass mirror mosaics. The studio encourages artists to explore and push their limits within several different disciplines. The studio space is an art installation and an experiment in interior design, to be displayed through a forthcoming music video and film projects.

=== Pentagram Lab - Vienna HQ ===
Pentagram Lab, consisting of Hecate's hand-picked collaborators, seeks to create handmade fetish tools and accessories. Inspired by Medieval-age torture and inquisition, they fashion their creations from reclaimed vintage leather, steel, copper and raw wood sourced from the mountains. Work began in October 2019, with the initial prototypes appearing on the official website in early 2020. This includes whips, masks and sex cranks.

== Discography ==
=== As Hecate ===
- Pay for Protection (Kool.POP 1997)
- Hate Cats (Praxis 1998)
- Negative World Status (Zhark London 1999)
- Supernal (Still Raven 2001)
- The Magick of Female Ejaculation (Zhark International / Praxis 2001)
- Capricorn Connectrix (YB-70 2002)
- Ascension Chamber (Zhark International / Praxis 2003)
- At the Seven Gates (Zhark International 2003)
- Seven Veils of Silence (Hymen / Zhark International 2004)
- Technical Witch/Tech Bitch (Sub/Version 2004)
- Wholesale Massacre of All Identifiable Replicas (Zhark International 2005)
- Brew Hideous (Hymen / Sublight Records 2006)
- Summer of Smoke (Reverse Records 2007)

=== As Raquel de Grimstone ===
- Venom Bytes (Homewrecker Foundation 2002)
- Liber Cordis Cincti Serpente (Mirex 2002)
- Depths of the Nile (Zhark International 2003)
- FreeMansonicYouth (Zhark International 2003)

=== Collaborations and projects ===
- In The Bush with Kareem (Zhark Recordings 1996)
- The Payback with Kareem (Zhark Recordings 1996)
- Hecate Jacks Off The Jackal (Zhark London 1999)
- The Thunderinas (Homewrecker Foundation 2001)
- Crisis Theory with Christoph Fringeli (Praxis 2002)
- Nymphomatriarch with Venetian Snares (Hymen Records 2003)
- White Darkness with Jason Koehnen (Roadburn Records 2007)
- Treachery – Treachery EP (Czar Of Crickets 2008)
- ABSOLUTION with Instinct Primal (Nova Alternative 2017)
- Final Planet 666 with Der Blutharsch (Wir Kapitullen Nicht / WKN52 2017)

=== Select remixes ===
- Hecate Remixes Le Tigre – All That Glitters (Mr. Lady 2000)
- Hecate vs. Lustmord – Law of the Battle of Conquest (Hymen Records 2002)
- Shapeshifters – The Remixes (Zhark International 2004)
- Hecate Remixes Misfits – Devilwhore (Carbon 2004)
- Hecate Remixes 'Bleeding Through' – Deathbed Remix (Halo 8 2006)
- Brew Hideous – The Remixes by White Darkness, Amboss, Vile Enginez and Slutmachine (Ad Noiseam 2011)

=== With Belphegor ===
- Pestapokalypse VI (Nuclear Blast 2006)
- Bondage Goat Zombie (Nuclear Blast 2008)
- Walpurgis Rites – Hexenwahn (Nuclear Blast 2009)
- Blood Magick Necromance (Nuclear Blast 2010)
- Conjuring The Dead (Nuclear Blast 2015)

== See also ==
- List of female electronic musicians
- List of breakcore artists
