= Deahl =

Deahl is a surname. Notable people with the surname include:

- Dani Deahl, American record producer
- James Deahl (born 1945), Canadian poet and publisher
- Joshua Deahl (born 1981), American attorney
- Robert “Bobby” Deahl, American record producer by the name, Kayoh.
- Martin Philip Deahl (born 1956). Professor of Psychiatry, Colonel UK Armed Forces

== See also ==
- Dahl (surname)
