= Tara Rodgers =

American musician

Tara Rodgers is an American electronic musician, composer, and author. She is a multi-instrumentalist who performs and releases work as Analog Tara.

== Education and career ==
Rodgers graduated from Brown University in 1995, earning an AB with Honors in American Studies. She received an MFA in Electronic Music and Recording Media from Mills College in 2006 and earned a PhD in Communication Studies from McGill University in 2011.

Rodgers was visiting faculty in sound at the School of the Museum of Fine Arts, Boston, from 2004 to 2005. She was a Canada-US Fulbright scholar in Montreal in 2006/2007. From 2010 to 2013, she was an assistant professor of Women's studies and Distinguished Faculty Fellow in Digital Cultures and Creativity at the University of Maryland. In 2011, Rodgers established the Women's Studies Multimedia Studio at UMD. Rodgers also served on the faculty of Dartmouth College in 2013.

Rodgers founded the website PinkNoises.com in 2000 to document the works of women in electronic music and to provide music production resources. The site was nominated for a Webby Award in the category of Best Music Website in 2003. Her composition, "Butterfly Effects," was inspired by the behaviors of migrating butterflies. Written in SuperCollider, it won the IAWM New Genre Prize in 2007. She authored the 2010 book Pink Noises: Women On Electronic Music And Sound, which is a collection of interviews spotlighting female electronic musicians, composers, producers, and DJs. The book received the 2011 Pauline Alderman Award from the International Alliance for Women in Music (IAWM).

Following the release of Pink Noises, Rodgers has published essays and lectured on the history of synthesized sound. She is currently working as a composer and performer in the Washington, D.C. area.
