= Conjuring the Dead =

Studio album by Belphegor
- Released: 5 August 2014
- Recorded: Mana Recording Studios, St. Petersburg, Florida, United States; 29 May 2012 - 15 April 2014
- Genre: Blackened death metal
- Length: 36:39
- Label: Nuclear Blast
- Producer: Erik Rutan

Belphegor chronology
Blood Magick Necromance (2011)	Conjuring the Dead (2014)	Totenritual (2017)

Singles from Conjuring the Dead
- 1. "Gasmask Terror" Released: 1 July 2014

Conjuring the Dead is the tenth studio album by the Austrian blackened death metal band Belphegor. It was released on 5 August 2014 through Nuclear Blast. The album was recorded by Erik Rutan at Mana Recording Studios in the United States. The album was preceded by the digital download single, "Gasmask Terror", which was released on 1 July 2014. Earlier, on 25 June, a lyric video for the same song was released.

A music video was shot for the title track, which was directed by Walter Fanninger. The album features cover art by Septicflesh bassist Seth Siro Anton.

== Track listing ==
All arrangements by Helmuth Lehner.

No.	Title	Lyrics	Music	Length
1.	"Gasmask Terror"	Belphegor	Helmuth Lehner, Vojtěch R.	3:41
2.	"Conjuring the Dead"	Belphegor	Helmuth Lehner, Vojtěch R.	4:33
3.	"In Death"	Belphegor	Helmuth Lehner, Vojtěch R.	4:12
4.	"Rex Tremendae Majestatis"	Belphegor	Helmuth Lehner, Vojtěch R.	5:21
5.	"Black Winged Torment"	Belphegor	Helmuth Lehner, Vojtěch R.	3:27
6.	"The Eyes" (instrumental)	Belphegor	Helmuth Lehner, Vojtěch R.	1:19
7.	"Legions of Destruction"	Belphegor	Helmuth Lehner, Vojtěch R.	4:28
8.	"Flesh, Bones and Blood"	Belphegor	Helmuth Lehner, Vojtěch R.	3:32
9.	"Lucifer, Take Her!"	Belphegor	Helmuth Lehner, Vojtěch R.	2:48
10.	"Pactum in Aeternum"	Belphegor	Helmuth Lehner, Vojtěch R.	3:18
Total length:				36:39

Special edition DVD
No.	Title	Length
1.	"Rehearsing/Bass/Drum/Guitar Tracking" (Making Of Conjuring the Dead)	11:41
2.	"Vokills Tracking" (Making Of Conjuring the Dead)	3:45
3.	"Angeli Mortis De Profundis" (Live In Liverpool)	3:04
4.	"Diaboli Virtus In Lumbar Est" (Live at Meh Suff Open Air)	4:13
5.	"In Blood – Devour This Sanctity" (Live In Moscow)	6:00
6.	"Feast Upon The Dead" (Unreleased, Live at Eindhoven Metal Meeting)	2:34
7.	"Bondage Goat Zombie" (Live at Party San Festival)	4:57
8.	"Justine Soaked In Blood" (Live at Umea HOM Festival)	4:04
9.	"Backstage" (Rekwi Festival, Germany)	0:51
10.	"Burg Aggstein (Austria)" (Sightseeing Cult Places)	9:04
11.	"Bone Church Kutna Hora (Czech Republic)"	1:23
12.	"Diashow" (Tattoo And Art Section)	3:26
13.	"Inside The Bunker" (Rehearsal Bunker)	6:38
14.	"Schwarty Swinefever" (Rehearsal Bunker)	1:28
15.	"Conjuring the Dead (Video Clip)" (Directed by Walter Fanninger)	4:22
16.	"Making Of Conjuring the Dead Video Clip"	3:36
Total length:		1:11:06

== Critical reception ==
Professional ratings
Review scores
Source	Rating
About.com	4/5 stars
Revolver	3/5 stars
MetalSucks	4.5/5 stars
Blabbermouth	8/10 stars
Metalholic	9/10 stars

After its release, Conjuring the Dead received mixed to positive reviews from music critics. Dave Schalek of About.com said "[...] a densely heavy album with a bludgeoning production courtesy of Erik Rutan, and chock full of excellent songwriting and musicianship. Although fast with plenty of blastbeats, Conjuring The Dead is at its best when Belphegor slow things down to a mid-paced tempo with catchy riffs and deliver an epic sweep to the music." Sammy O'hagar of MetalSucks noted that "Everything is in perfect balance, which is both exhilarating and dangerous. Conjuring the Dead is the ideal snapshot of blackened death metal. It weaves the two genres together seamlessly, then pulls them both apart so each can shine then wonderfully segue back into each other. The blackened parts display a relentless near-grindcore ferocity."

Tony Vilgotsky of Russian metal magazine Dark City rated this album with five out of five stars. He recommended the record "to anyone who respects genuine extreme metal and true heaviness."

== Personnel ==
Belphegor

- Helmuth Lehner - vocals, guitars, lyrics
- Serpenth - bass guitar, vocals

Additional musicians

- Ms. Alexandra "Dollface" Van Weitus - vocals
- Glen Benton - vocals on "Legions of Destruction"
- Attila Csihar - vocals "Legions of Destruction"
- Martin "Marthyn" Jovanović - drums
- Sebastian Lanser - sampler, effects
- Norwin Palme - sampler, effects

Production

- Seth Siro Anton - artwork
- Rachael "Hecate" Kozak - lyrics
- Mina Korzan - lyrics
- Mr. Blood Seraph - lyrics
- Sigurd Hagenauer - lyrics
- Pagan Megan Leo - lyrics
- Erik Rutan - tracking, mixing, producer
- Alan Douches - mastering
- Jakob Klingsbigl, Matthias Reindl, Norwin Palme - recording
- Robert Caldwell - engineer assistant
- Gwenn Negative Art, Sunvemetal, Thomas Adorff, - photography

Note

- Recorded at Mana Recording Studios in St. Petersburg, Florida, U.S.
- Four recording sessions between 29 May 2012 and 15 April 2014.
- Guitar pre-recordings done at Mischmaschine Studio, February 2012 - May 2012.
- Additional vocals recorded at Parkdeck studios, and Stretch-audio.
- Video "Angeli Mortis De Profundis" filmed live during the show at The Masque in Liverpool, UK, on 27 June 2011.
- Video "Diaboli Virtus In Lumbar Est" filmed live at the Meh Suff Open Air festival from Switzerland on 9 August 2013.
- Video "In Blood – Devour This Sanctity" filmed live during the show at Moskva Hall from Moscow, Russia, on 6 October 2013.
- Video "Feast Upon The Dead" filmed live during the Eindhoven Metal Meeting festival from the Netherlands on 13 December 2013.
- Video "Bondage Goat Zombie" filmed live at the Party San Open Air festival from Germany in 2011.
- Video "Justine Soaked In Blood" filmed live at the House Of Metal festival from Umeå, Sweden, on 1 March 2014.
- Backstage video filmed at the Rekwi Festival from Germany on 20 October 2013.

== "Gasmask Terror" ==
"Gasmask Terror" is the second single by Belphegor. It was released on 1 July 2014 by Nuclear Blast.

=== Track listing ===
No.	Title	Lyrics	Music	Length
1.	"Gasmask Terror"	Rachael "Hecate" Kozak, Helmuth, Mina Korzan	Helmuth, Serpenth	03:41

== Charts ==
Chart (2014)	Peak position
Austrian Albums Chart	33
Belgian Albums (Ultratop Flanders)	187
German Albums Chart	60
Japanese Albums (Oricon)	245
US Top Heatseekers (Billboard)	13

== Release history ==
Formats	Region	Date	Label
CD, CD+DVD, LP, digital download	North America	5 August 2014	Nuclear Blast
CD, CD+DVD, LP, digital download	Japan	6 August 2014	Ward Records
CD, CD+DVD, LP, digital download	Europe, Brazil	8 August 2014	Nuclear Blast
CD, CD+DVD, LP, digital download	UK, France	11 August 2014	Nuclear Blast
CD, CD+DVD, LP, digital download	Russia	11 August 2014	Soyuz Music
