= Pestapokalypse VI =

Studio album by Belphegor
- Released: 27 October 2006
- Recorded: Stage One Studios, Kassel, Germany
- Genre: Blackened death metal
- Length: 38:02
- Label: Nuclear Blast
- Producer: Andy Classen

Belphegor chronology
Goatreich-Fleshcult (2005)	Pestapokalypse VI (2006)	Bondage Goat Zombie (2008)

Professional ratings
Review scores
Source	Rating
About.com	3.5/5 stars
Allmusic	2.5/5 stars
Blabbermouth	8/10 stars
Chronicles of Chaos	8.5/10 stars
Exclaim!	Mixed

Pestapokalypse VI is the sixth studio album by Austrian blackened death metal band Belphegor. It was produced by Andy Classen at Stage One Studio and released in 2006.

== Track listing ==
No.	Title	Lyrics	Music	Length
1.	"Belphegor – Hell's Ambassador"	Barth	Helmuth	4:24
2.	"Seyn Todt in Schwartz"	Helmuth	Helmuth	3:22
3.	"Angel of Retribution"	Helmuth	Helmuth	5:31
4.	"Chants for the Devil 1533"	Helmuth, Barth	Helmuth	4:42
5.	"Pest Teufel Apokalypse"	Helmuth, Barth	Helmuth	5:03
6.	"The Ancient Enemy"	Sigurd	Helmuth	3:23
7.	"Bluhtsturm Erotika"	Helmuth	Helmuth, Barth	3:48
8.	"Sanctus Perversum"	Sigurd	Sigurd	5:02
9.	"Das Pesthaus / Miasma Epilog" (instrumental)		Helmuth	2:47
Total length:				38:02

== Personnel ==
Belphegor

- Helmuth Lehner – vocals, guitars, bass guitar
- Sigurd Hagenauer – guitars
- Bartholomäus "Barth" Resch – bass guitar
- Tomasz "Nefastus" Janiszewski – drums

Additional musicians

- Rachael "Hecate" Kozak – "Miasma" outro

Production

- Andy Classen – producer, mixing, mastering
- Joe Wimmer – photography
- Seth Siro Anton – cover art

Note

- Recorded and mixed at Stage One Studios, Kassel, Germany.

== Charts ==
Chart performance
Chart (2026)	Peak position
Polish Albums (ZPAV)	51
