= Lucifer Incestus =

Studio album by Belphegor
- Released: 24 November 2003
- Genre: Blackened death metal
- Length: 36:25
- Language: English, Latin
- Label: Napalm
- Producer: Helmuth, Alexander Krull

Belphegor chronology
Infernal Live Orgasm (2002)	Lucifer Incestus (2003)	Goatreich-Fleshcult (2005)

Professional ratings
Review scores
Source	Rating
Chronicles of Chaos	8/10 stars
Exclaim!	Mixed

Lucifer Incestus is the fourth studio album by the Austrian blackened death metal band Belphegor.

== Track listing ==
No.	Title	Lyrics	Music	Length
1.	"Intro: Inflamate Christianos"			0:33
2.	"The Goatchrist"	Helmuth Lehner	Helmuth Lehner	4:19
3.	"Diaboli Virtus in Lumbar Est" (The Virtue of the Devil is in His Loins)"	Sigurd Hagenauer	Helmuth Lehner	3:49
4.	"Demonic Staccato Erection"	Helmuth Lehner	Helmuth Lehner	5:01
5.	"Paradise Regained"	Sigurd Hagenauer	Sigurd Hagenauer	4:12
6.	"Fukk the Blood of Christ"	Bartholomäus Resch, Helmuth Lehner	Helmuth Lehner	5:47
7.	"Lucifer Incestus"	Helmuth Lehner, Bartholomäus Resch	Helmuth Lehner	2:44
8.	"The Sin-Hellfucked"	Helmuth Lehner	Helmuth Lehner, Florian Klein	5:44
9.	"Fleischrequiem 69 / Outro"	Helmuth Lehner, Bartholomäus Resch	Helmuth Lehner	4:16
Total length:				36:25

== Personnel ==
Belphegor

- Helmuth Lehner - vocals, guitars
- Sigurd Hagenauer - guitars
- Bartholomäus "Barth" Resch - bass

Additional musicians

- Florian "Torturer" Klein - drums
- Mathias "der Hexer" Röderer - synthesizers

Production

- Tomasz "Graal" Daniłowicz - cover art
- Martin Schmidt, Mathias Röderer - engineer assistant
- Monsieur Joe Wimmer - photography
- Alexander Krull - Producer, recording, mixing, mastering
- Helmuth - Producer

Note

- Recorded, engineered, mixed and mastered at Mastersound Studio-Germany, Fellbach in 2003.

== Release history ==
Formats	Region	Date	Label
CD, LP, digital download	Europe	24 November 2003	Napalm Records
CD, LP, digital download	Russia	20 July 2004	Irond Records
