= Liset Alea =

American singer

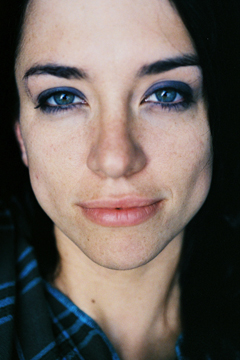
- Alea in 2007

Background information
- Also known as: Alea
- Born: Lissette Gonzalez-Alea; May 8, 1979 (age 47); Havana, Cuba
- Genres: Pop; electronic; trip hop; drum and bass; new wave; bossa nova
- Occupation: Singer-songwriter
- Instruments: Vocals, guitar, bass
- Years active: 1998–current
- Labels: EMI, Kwaidan
- Formerly of: Nouvelle Vague; Etro Anime

Liset Alea is the stage name of Lissette Gonzalez-Alea, a Cuban-born singer, songwriter and multi-instrumentalist who lives in Paris, best known as a solo artist and lead singer in Nouvelle Vague.

== Career ==
=== Early collaborations and solo work ===
In 1998, Alea co-founded drum & bass/trip hop band Etro Anime. She co-wrote all the songs and provided lead vocals on their 2003 album See the Sound. Soon after, she left the band to pursue a solo career. Her debut LP, No Sleep, was released in multiple European territories on EMI in 2005. Around that time, she also began writing songs for other artists, including "Catfight," a single from Belgium’s Star Academy winner Katerine’s 2005 debut. She later co-wrote "Il Futuro Che Sara" for Chiara Galiazzo, which was in competition at the 2013 Sanremo Music Festival in Italy.

In 2010, Alea independently wrote and co-produced a Spanish-language album, Sin Cera. It has not been released.

=== Nouvelle Vague ===
In 2008, Alea met Marc Collin, the founder of Nouvelle Vague. She opened for the group in Miami, and officially joined them as a lead singer in 2009. She sings a cover of the Cocteau Twins song "Athol Brose" on Nouvelle Vague's 2016 album I Could Be Happy. After 8 years of touring with the band, she left the group in 2017.

=== Music in television ===
While residing in Paris, Alea began collaborating with French DJ Alexkid, appearing on his 2003 album Mint. In 2009, Alea, Alexkid and French producer/DJ Rodriguez Jr formed the Honeythieves. The trio's song "Reminder" was in 2009 episodes of Entourage and 90210, and was remixed by RAC’s Andre Anjos.

== Performances and collaborations ==
“Ceremony," a multimedia "costume show turned concert" created and directed by French fashion designer Jean-Charles de Castelbajac, was based on Nouvelle Vague's repertoire. Alea participated in all live performances of the musical, including presentations of the show at the 2011 digital arts festival Exit at the MAC Creteil art center in Los Angeles, and at the 2012 White Nights Festival in Tel Aviv.

Alea has been singled out for her unique style and presence, and for "providing a strong, sultry voice and some amazing vocal pyrotechnics." She has toured the world with Nouvelle Vague, including North America, Europe, Russia and South Africa. She has done a European tour with Alexkid in support of the release of Mint, a tour supporting Sananda Maitreya (formerly known as Terence Trent D'Arby), and performed with Raul Paz. She shared the stage with Juanes at the 2009 Paz Sin Fronteras II concert in Cuba, performing to an audience of 1.2 million people.

== Personal life ==
Alea was born in Havana, Cuba. She was raised in Miami, Florida, and has lived in New York City, Costa Rica, Paris, London and Amsterdam. She is in a relationship with musician Rodriguez Jr.

== Discography ==
=== Solo ===
- No Sleep (2005, EMI)
- Sin Cera (2010, unreleased)
- Hunter and Tiger EP (2016)
- Heart-Headed (2016)

=== Appears on ===
- Etro Anime – See the Sound (2003)
- Alexkid – Mint (2003)
- Alexkid – Caracol (2006)
- Dubphonic – Relight (2009)
- Olga Kouklaki – I U Need (2012)

=== TV/film soundtrack appearances ===
- Las Vegas – "Come With Me" (with Alexkid) (2003, Season 1, Episode 9)
- Six Feet Under – "Don't Hide It" (with Alexkid) (2005, Season 5, Episode 59)
- Entourage – "Reminder" (with Honeythieves) (2009, Season 6, Episode 11)
- 90210 – "Reminder (RAC Remix)" (with Honeythieves ) (2009, Season 2, Episode 3)
- Holy Rollers – "If You Forget Me" (with Remix Artist Collective) (2010)

=== Songwriting ===
Year	Artist	Album	Song	Credit
2005	Katerine	Katerine	"Catfight"	Co-writer
2005	Katerine	Katerine	"2much4you"	Co-writer
2006	Ewa Farna	Měls mě vůbec rád	"Kočka na rozpálený střeše"	Co-writer
2006	Ewa Farna	Měls mě vůbec rád	"Nebojím se"	Co-writer
2007	Ewa Farna	Sam na sam	"Kotka na gorącym dachu"	Co-writer
2007	Ewa Farna	Sam na sam	"Nie chcę się bać"	Co-writer
2009	Noemi	Noemi	"Stelle Appiccicate"	Co-writer
2010	Ruben Hein	Loose Fit	"If Friends Is All"	Co-writer
2010	Ruben Hein	Loose Fit	"Somebody to Love"	Co-writer
2011	Marc Collin and Liset Alea	Kiss Me OST	"Burning Star"	Co-writer, singer
2013	Chiara Galiazzo	Un Posto Nel Mondo	"Il Futuro Che Sara"	Co-writer
2013	Élodie Frégé	Amuse Bouches	"Pique-Nique Sur la Lune"	Co-writer
2013	Élodie Frégé	Amuse Bouches	"Mes Bas"	Co-writer
2014	Filippos Pliatsikas	I Alli Plevra Tou Ble	"The Other Side of Blue"	Co-writer, singer
2016	Nouvelle Vague	I Could Be Happy	"Algo Familiar"	Writer, singer
2017	Zuco Sound	Muddy / Sweet	"Heavy Love"	Co-writer, singer
2017	Rodriguez Jr.	Baobab	"Take a Walk"	Writer, singer
2017	Rodriguez Jr.	Baobab	"The Heart Is a Woman"	Writer, singer
2017	Rodriguez Jr.	Baobab	"Waste Tomorrow"	Writer, singer
