= Belphegor (band) =

Austrian metal band

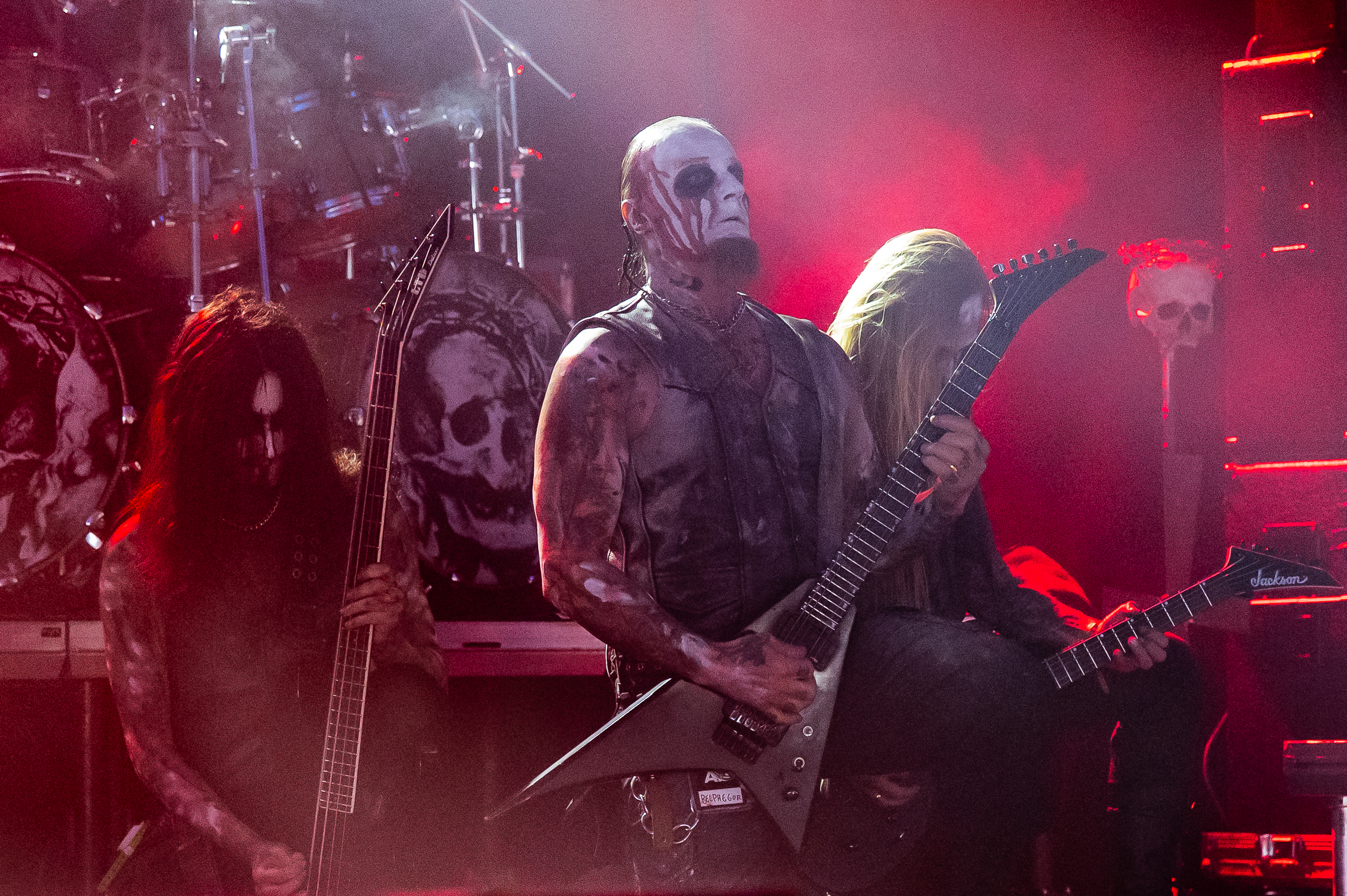
- Belphegor performing live at Tons of Rock 2025

Background information
- Also known as: Betrayer (1991–1992)
- Origin: Salzburg, Austria
- Genres: Death metal, black metal
- Years active: 1991–present
- Labels: Napalm, Nuclear Blast, Reigning Phoenix
- Members: Helmuth; Serpenth
- Past members: Sigurd Hagenauer; Maxx; Chris; Marius "Reverend Mausna" Klausner; Bartholomäus "Barth" Resch; Florian "Torturer" Klein; Nefastus; Simon "BloodHammer" Schilling
- Website: belphegor.at

Belphegor is an Austrian extreme metal band from Salzburg. They formed in 1991 as Betrayer before changing their name in 1993, deriving their current name from the demon of the same name.

== History ==
=== Early years (1991–1997) ===
Vocalist and bassist Maxx, guitarists Helmuth and Sigurd, and drummer Chris founded the band as Betrayer in 1991. The band released their first demo, Kruzifixion, in April 1991, and Unborn Blood later on. After adopting the name Belphegor in 1993, they released the demo Bloodbath in Paradise on Maxi-CD format. Before or after the release of this demo, Maxx departed the band, and Helmuth took over vocalist and guitarist. In between 1993 and 1996, session member A-X performed bass, after which bassist Mario "Marius" Klausner joined the band full-time.

The band signed to Perverted Taste Records, which released the demo Obscure and Deep in 1994. This release featured a cover of Black Sabbath's "Sabbath Bloody Sabbath". Their first album, The Last Supper, was released by Lethal Records in January 1995. At this time, the band's logo was redesigned to include two inverted crosses surrounded by blood.

=== Last Episode and Phallelujah Productions (1997–2002) ===
The band's second album, Blutsabbath, was released in October 1997, featuring session drummer Man of Mastic Scum. This was followed by an eighteen-date tour of Europe in April and May 1998 with Behemoth and Ancient. The band's debut album, The Last Supper, was rereleased in 1999 with new artwork and six bonus tracks from the Obscure And Deep EP.

The following year, the third album, Necrodaemon Terrorsathan, was released by Last Episode (now known as Black Attakk). Man performed session drums. The band left Last Episode and denounced them as a "rip-off label". In January 2001, Belphegor headlined a few shows at 'Fuck The Commerce IV', 'With Full Force VIII' and 'Hell On Earth' in Germany with support from Dunkelgrafen and Dawn of Dreams. In 2002, Belphegor played at the Summerbreeze, Brutal Assault and Morbide Festspiele prior to further German shows in December. Around this time, Belphegor recruited drummer Torturer (Mor Dagor) and bassist Barth. After releasing their live album Infernal Live Orgasm on their own label Phallelujah Productions, they signed with Napalm Records.

=== Napalm Records (2003–2005) ===
After signing with Napalm Records, vocalist and guitarist Helmuth, guitarist Sigurd, bassist Barth, and drummer Torturer recorded the fourth album, Lucifer Incestus, produced by Alex Krull of Atrocity. The album was released in December 2003. A European tour followed.

Belphegor entered Mastersound Studio in Fellbach during September 2004 to record their fifth album, Goatreich - Fleshcult, produced by Alex Krull. The band undertook a mini-tour in November with Disastrous Murmur, and played at the X-Mass Festival with Napalm Death, Marduk, Finntroll and Vader. In February 2005, Goatreich - Fleshcult was released in various formats, including a vinyl edition limited to 1000 copies. Digipack variants added the instrumental bonus track "Heresy Of Fire". That month, drummer Torturer left the band and Nefastus (Tomas Janiszewski) replaced him. In April, Belphegor headlined the eighteen-day Goatreich - Fleshcult Europe Tour Pt. I with support from Arkhon Infaustus, Asmodeus and In Aeternum. The band departed Napalm Records on the grounds that the label "did not support them enough" and they were "fed up with this respectless [sic] treatment."

=== Early years with Nuclear Blast (2005–2009) ===
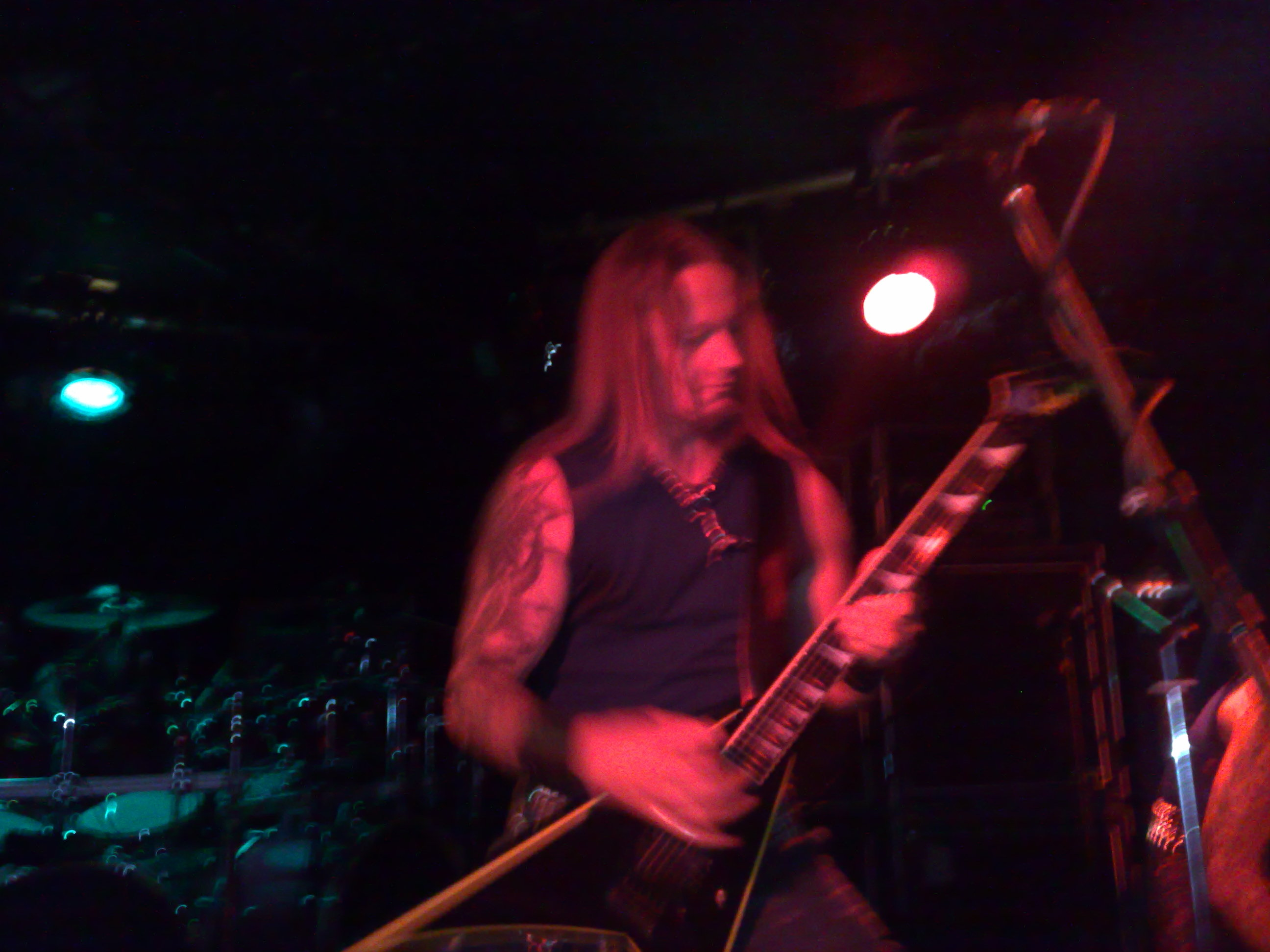
Frontman/guitarist Helmuth performing with Belphegor in London, September 2008

Belphegor signed with Nuclear Blast in 2005, and began recording the album Pestapokalypse VI in producer Andy Classen's Stage One Studios in November. Classen had produced the band's debut album, The Last Supper.

After playing bass on six of the nine tracks on the new album, Barth left the band due to a career-ending hand injury. Belphegor withdrew from a tour with Hate Eternal in April 2006, and Helmuth recorded the remaining bass lines on the new album while Robin Eaglestone (ex-Cradle of Filth, Imperial Black) came in as a live bassist for performances between April and October. Barth's full-time replacement, Serpenth, joined the band in October.

Pestapokalypse VI was released in October 2006. Drummer Nefastus left the band. Session drummers were recruited, including Lille Grubber, Blastphemer (Jan Benkwitz) and former Belphegor drummer Torturer. That month, Nuclear Blast issued a special ammunition box variant of the Pestapokalypse VI album, limited to 500 copies and packed with the CD in digipack, a patch, a belt and "emergency provisions". A vinyl version of the album was restricted to 500 copies. Pestapokalypse VI was promoted with videos for the songs "Bluhtsturm Erotika" and "Belphegor - Hell's Ambassador", directed by Florian Werner.

Belphegor were set to play the X-Mass Festival in December 2006, but the festival was cancelled. They were among the bands supporting Danzig on their Blackest of the Black tour in North America in December 2006 – January 2007, and they toured North America again in February–March 2007 with Unleashed, Krisiun, and Hatesphere. With support initially from Kataklysm and Unleashed and later from Arkhon Infaustus, Belphegor headlined the Midvinterblot European Tour Part II in May. The band played at Wacken Open Air festival in August. In September, the band co-headlined with Gorgoroth in most of the venues on the latter's South American tour.

In January 2008, founding member Sigurd underwent eye surgery, and it was unknown whether he would resume his role in Belphegor. A few months later, Helmuth said Sigurd had left the band permanently following their European tour in late 2007. Anthony Paulini replaced him on Belphegor's North American tour in February 2008. Morluch eventually joined as full-time guitarist.

In April 2008, Bondage Goat Zombie was released with Helmuth on vocals and lead and rhythm guitars, bassist Serpenth, and drummer Torturer. In addition to a standard CD release, this album came in a variety of formats, including a limited edition digipack with a DVD hosting video clips, behind the scenes footage, a studio "making of" documentary, live footage and a "freak" section, and a further limited option in Stahl helmet packaging with dogtag as well as a red vinyl version limited to 1000 copies. This was followed by an appearance at the Hellfest Summer Open Air festival in France in June 2008. They supported Nile and Grave on the Ithyphallic tour of Europe in September 2008. In October 2008, the band toured North America with Amon Amarth.

=== Walpurgis Rites - Hexenwahn (2009–present) ===
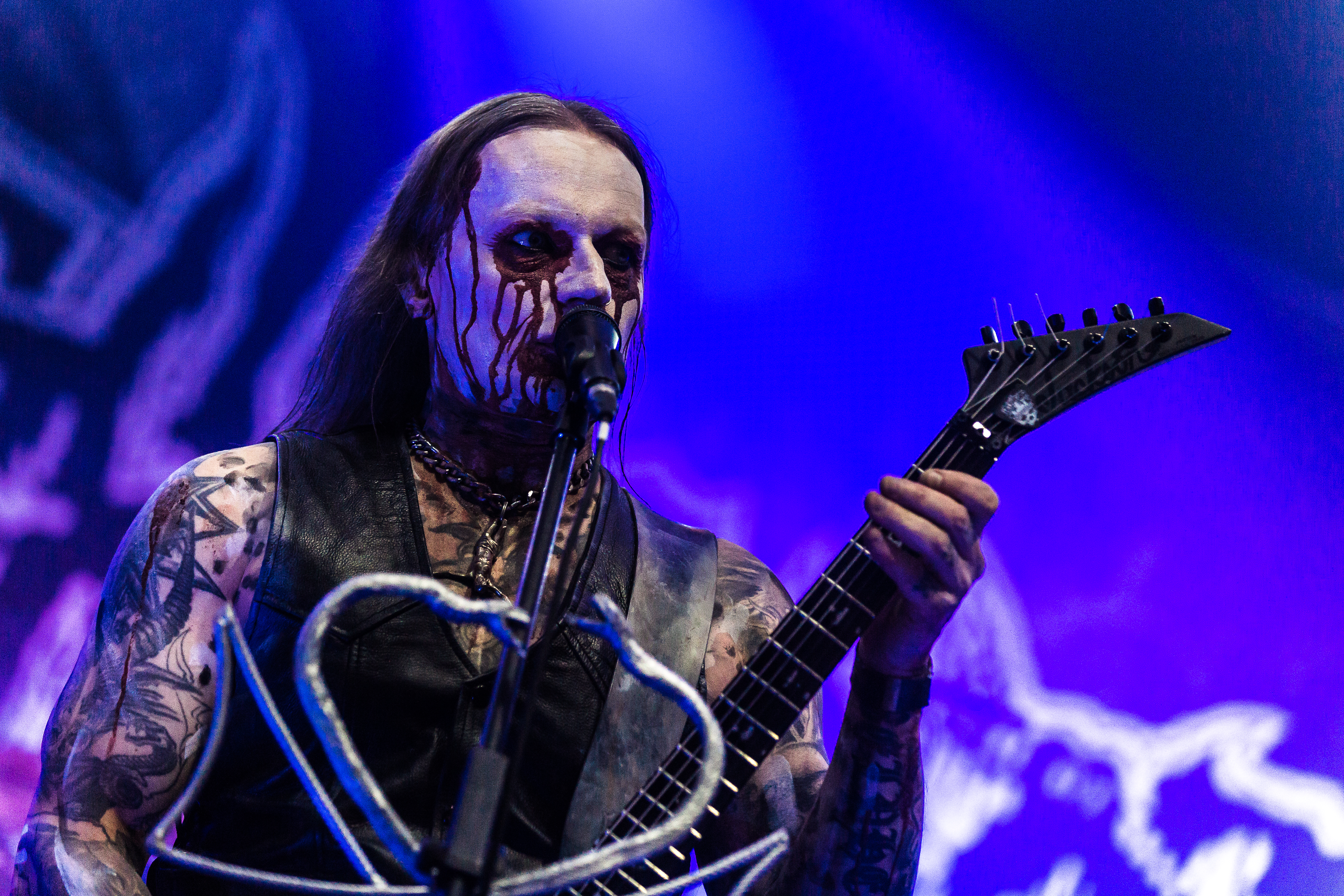
Helmuth Lehner, With Full Force 2018

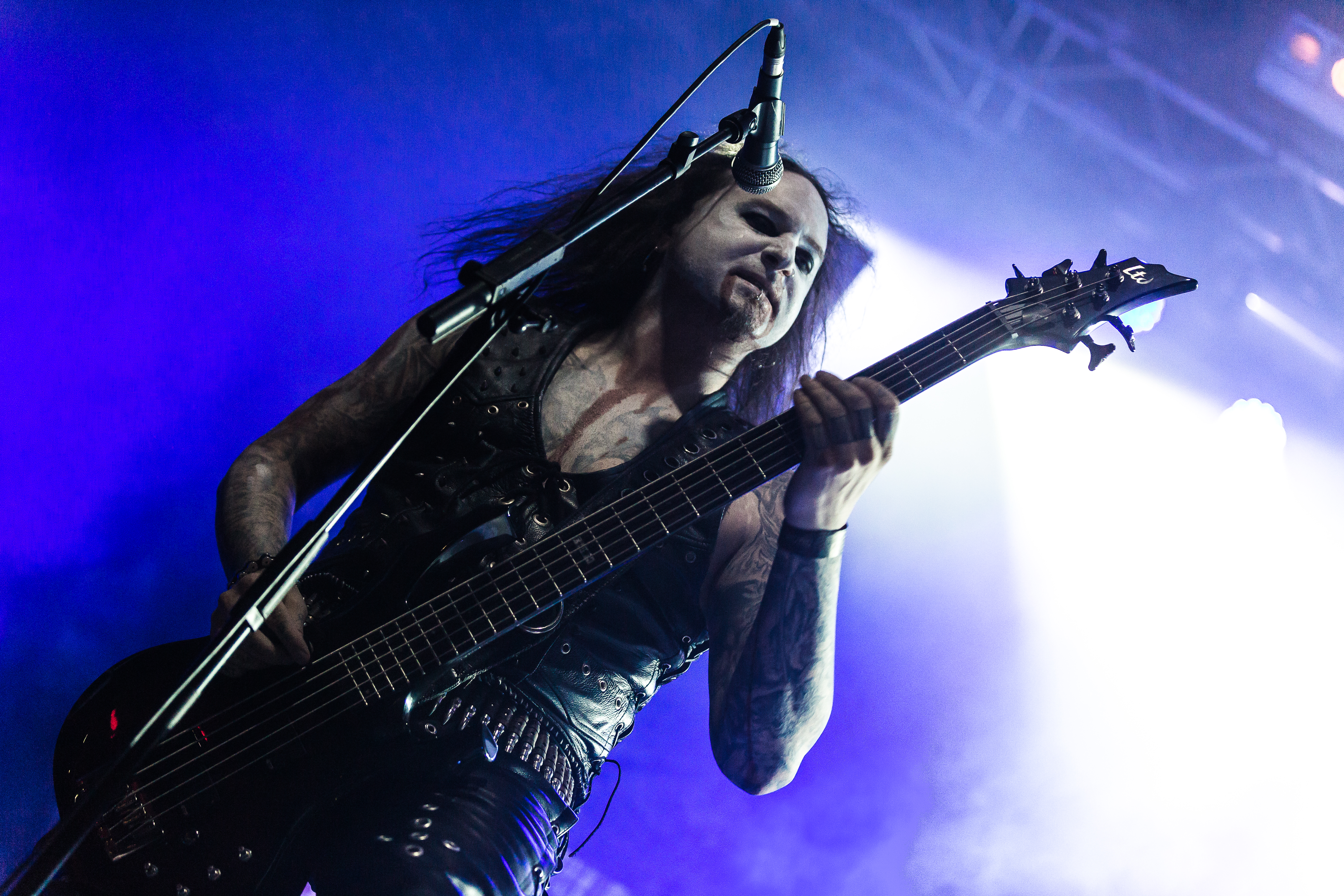
Serpenth, With Full Force 2018

In January 2009, the band announced they were working on a new album, and Nefastus would play drums again. It was reported that recording began in February 2009, and Nefastus completed recording the drum parts. On 23 February 2009, Helmuth announced the rhythm guitar and bass lines had been recorded in the second studio session. The album was tentatively titled Hexenwahn - Totenkult:

As opposed to previous tales of the inquisition, this focuses upon the darker, more dismal of the mighty, powerful witches who conjure and worship demons. Those who have a pact with the forces of hell through the occult. The concept deals with demonology, witchcraft/ Hexenwahn, depraved suKKubi, blackest erotica, and as always, the grand devil, himself.

On 9 June 2009, the album's title was revealed as Walpurgis Rites - Hexenwahn. On 3 July 2009, the recording was completed and the album would be released in October 2009. Brazilian artist Marcelo Hvc started work on the album cover and art.

The band embarked on another North American tour in April 2009, headlined by Kreator and Exodus, with Warbringer and Epicurean.

In November 2009, the band joined the Heathenfest tour in North America with Eluveitie, Alestorm, Kivimetsän Druidi, and Vreid. In December 2009, the band played in South America with Obituary.

On 14 January 2011, Belphegor released the album Blood Magick Necromance and toured the US with Sepultura to support the album.

The band was on hold after their 2011 South American tour until May 2012 due to Lehner undergoing surgery after being infected with typhoid fever.

On 23 August 2014, the band performed at the Agglutination Metal Festival in Italy with Carcass and Entombed A.D.

Belphegor released their tenth album, Conjuring The Dead, on 8 August 2014 via Nuclear Blast. It entered the official German charts at #60 and reached #33 in the Austrian album charts, #177 in France, #13 Heatseekers #52 "Hard Music" charts in USA and #58 in Canada. It was their best charting ever in these countries.

Before Belphegor's show in St. Petersburg, Helmuth Lehner was attacked by Anatoly Artyukh, an orthodox activist and the assistant of the deputy Vitaly Milonov. The incident happened at the Pulkovo Airport on 19 April 2016.

The band released their eleventh album, Totenritual, on 15 September 2017.

In April 2022, the band announced their twelfth album, The Devils, would be released on 24 June. The album's release date was pushed back twice due to manufacturing delays, once for 8 July, and then to 29 July.

The band toured the US in the winter of 2026 with Incantation, Hate and Narcotic Waste supporting.

== Members ==
Current members

- Helmuth Lehner - guitars (1991–present), lead vocals (1996-present)
- Serpenth - bass, backing vocals (2006–present)

Current live members

- Daniel 'Nar-Sil' Rutkowski - drums (2026–present)
- Wolfgang Rothbauer - guitars (2023–present)
- Chris Bonos - bass, backing vocals (2025–present)

Former members

- Maxx - bass, lead vocals (1991–1996)
- Chris - drums (1991–1996)
- Sigurd Hagenauer - guitars (1991–2007)
- Mario "Marius" Klausner - bass, backing vocals (1996–2001)
- Bartholomäus "Barth" Resch - bass, backing vocals (2002–2006)
- Tomasz "Nefastus" Janiszewski - drums (2005–2006)
- Morluch - guitars (2008–2009)
- Simon "BloodHammer" Schilling - drums (2015–2018)

Former live members

- A-X - bass (1993–1996)
- Robin Eaglestone - bass (2006)
- Jan "Blastphemer" Benkwitz - drums (2006)
- Lille Gruber - drums (2007)
- Tony Laureano - drums (2007)
- Robert Kovačič - drums (2007–2009)
- Anthony Paulini - guitars (2008, 2010)
- Bernd "Bernth" Brodträger - guitars (2010–2011)
- Oli Beaudoin - drums (2011)
- Bartholomäus "Barth" Resch - vocals (2012)
- Schoft - guitars, backing vocals (2013–2014)
- Martin "Molokh" Arzberger - guitars (2015-2016, 2020–2023)
- Sascha "Impaler" - guitars, backing vocals (2015–2018)
- Ricardo "Horus" Falcon - guitars (2018–2020)
- Eugene "Ravager" Ryabchenko - drums (2018–2020)
- Pawel Jaroszewicz - drums (2019–2020)
- Julian David Guillen - bass, backing vocals (2024)
- James Stewart - drums (2021–2025)

Session musicians

- Tomasz "Nefastus" Janiszewski - drums (2008–2009)
- Martin "Marthyn" Jovanović - drums (2009–2015)
- Florian "Torturer" Klein - drums (2000–2005, 2006–2008)
- Man Gandler - drums (1996–2000)

== Discography ==
=== Studio albums ===
Title	Album details	Peak chart positions					Sales
Title	Album details	AUT	GER	US Heat	BEL (FL)	JPN	Sales
The Last Supper	Released: 20 January 1995; Label: Lethal Records; Formats: CD, LP, digital download	—	—	—	—	—	
Blutsabbath	Released: 1 October 1997; Label: Last Episode; Formats: CD, LP, digital download	—	—	—	—	—	
Necrodaemon Terrorsathan	Released: 17 May 2000; Label: Last Episode; Formats: CD, LP, digital download	—	—	—	—	—	
Lucifer Incestus	Released: 24 November 2003; Label: Napalm Records; Formats: CD, LP, digital download	—	—	—	—	—	
Goatreich – Fleshcult	Released: 28 February 2005; Label: Napalm Records; Formats: CD, LP, digital download	—	—	—	—	—	
Pestapokalypse VI	Released: 27 October 2006; Label: Nuclear Blast; Formats: CD, LP, digital download	—	—	—	—	—	
Bondage Goat Zombie	Released: 11 April 2008; Label: Nuclear Blast; Formats: CD, CD+DVD, LP, digital download	42	81	—	—	—	
Walpurgis Rites – Hexenwahn	Released: 9 October 2009; Label: Nuclear Blast; Formats: CD, LP, digital download	60	99	—	—	—	US: 900+
Blood Magick Necromance	Released: 14 January 2011; Label: Nuclear Blast; Formats: CD, LP, digital download	39	97	48	—	—	US: 1,430+
Conjuring the Dead	Released: 5 August 2014; Label: Nuclear Blast; Formats: CD, CD+DVD, LP, digital download	33	60	13	187	245	US: 2,350+
Totenritual	Released: 15 September 2017; Label: Nuclear Blast; Formats: CD, LP, digital download	46	70	24	139	—	
The Devils	Released: 29 July 2022; Label: Nuclear Blast; Formats: CD, LP, digital download	8	22	—	—	—	
"—" denotes a recording that did not chart or was not released in that territory.

=== EPs ===
Title	Album details
Bloodbath in Paradise	Released: 7 February 1993; Label: Self-released; Formats: CD
Obscure and Deep	Released: 1994; Label: Perverted Taste; Formats: LP

=== Live albums ===
Title	Album details
Infernal Live Orgasm	Released: 2 April 2002; Label: Phallelujah; Formats: CD

=== Videos ===
Year	Title	Directed	Album
2001	"Vomit Upon the Cross"	—	Infernal Live Orgasm
2004	"Lucifer Incestus"	—	Lucifer Incestus
2005	"Bleeding Salvation"	Florian Werner	Goatreich - Fleshcult
2006	"Belphegor - Hell's Ambassador"	Florian Werner	Pestapokalypse VI
2006	"Bluhtstorm Erotika"	Florian Werner	Pestapokalypse VI
2006	"Hells Ambassador"	Florian Werner	Pestapokalypse VI
2008	"Bondage Goat Zombie"	Florian Werner	Bondage Goat Zombie
2009	"Der Geistertreiber"	Walter Fanninger	Walpurgis Rites - Hexenwahn
2011	"Impaled Upon the Tongue of Sathan"	Alexander Koenig	Blood Magick Necromance
2013	"In Blood - Devour This Sanctity"	Andrey Kovalev	Blood Magick Necromance
2014	"Conjuring The Dead"	Walter Fanninger	Conjuring The Dead
2015	"Black Winged Torment"	Guilherme Henriques	Conjuring The Dead
2017	"Baphomet"		Totenritual
2020	"Necrodaemon Terrorsathan"		Necrodaemon Terrorsathan
2021	"Blackest Sabbath 1997"		Reissue of Blutsabbath
2022	"Virtus Asinaria — Prayer"	Thomas Keplinger/ Framepunk Guerilla	The Devils
2022	"The Devils"	Thomas Keplinger/ Framepunk Guerilla	The Devils
