= Teresa Rampazzi =

Italian composer

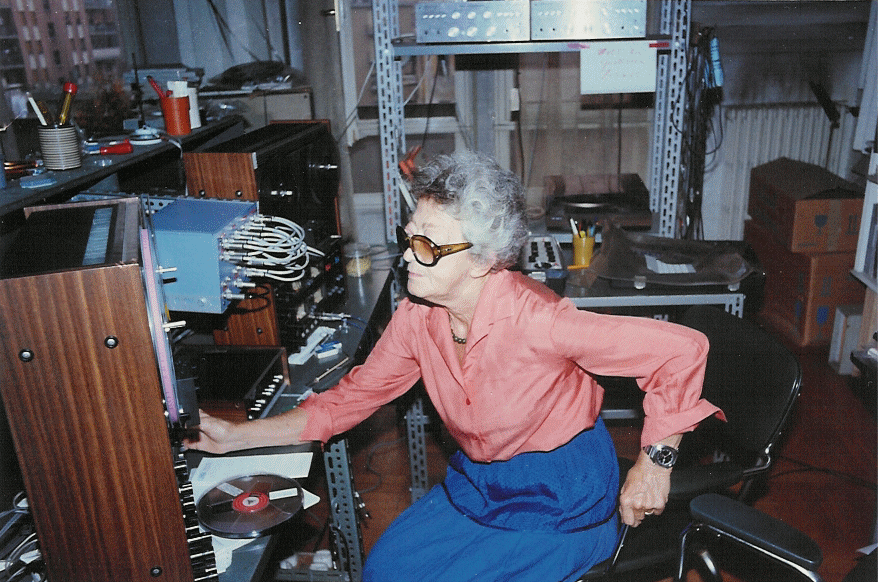
Teresa Rampazzi, 1995 ca. (Bassano del Grappa)

Teresa Rampazzi née Teresa Rossi (31 October 1914 – 16 December 2001) was an Italian pianist and composer who was a pioneer of electronic and computer generated music.

== Biography ==
Teresa Rampazzi was born in Vicenza, Italy, and studied piano as a child, then continued her studies at the Milan Conservatory and graduated with a diploma in piano in 1933. During these conservatory years, she met Severino Gazzelloni, René Leibowitz, Franco Donatoni who became close friends. She married and lived for a while in Vicenza until 1948, Venice until 1959, and Verona. In 1955 she moved with her husband to Padua where she became a member of the Trio Bartók and the Circolo Pozzetto music ensembles.

Rampazzi developed an interest in avant-garde music and attended the Ferienkurse Darmstadt during the 1950s where she heard a frequency generator for the first time in her life, introduced by Herbert Eimert. In February 1959 John Cage arrived in Padova (during one of his first journeys in Italy) and Teresa Rampazzi gave a concert with him and with Heinz-Klaus Metzger and Sylvano Bussotti. They played Music for Piano, Winter Music, Variations I & II, Music Walk.

Later she sold her piano and with Ennio Chiggio formed the NPS Group (Nuove Proposte Sonore), an experimental collective to research sound generation with analogue devices. (Her husband bought back the piano.) She continued to work with Chiggio until 1968, and continue her activity with the NPS group until 1972 when she took a teaching position in 1972 as professor of electronic music at the Padova Conservatory (one of the first electronic music courses in Italy), where she continued to work on tone research and to publish professional articles on electronic music. She worked internationally at the Institute of Sonology in Utrecht, at Catholic University in Washington, at the electromusic studio in Stockholm, at the department of computer music at the University of Pisa and at the CSC Computer Music Center in Padova.

After her husband died in 1983, Rampazzi moved to Assisi and then to Bassano, where she continued to compose. She died in Bassano del Grappa in 2001.

== Works ==
Rampazzi's works were composed through electronic sound generation and recorded on tape, and have been used on the soundtracks of documentary films and for ballets. Selected works include:

- ipotesi1 (1965)
- ipotesi2 (1965)
- Research1 (1965)
- Ricerca2 (1965)
- Ricerca3 (1965)
- Ricerca4 (1965)
- Operation 1 (1966)
- Operation 2 (1966)
- Operation 3 (1966)
- Function 1 (1966)
- Function 3 (1966)
- Function 4 (2 tracks)(1966)
- Function 3 (1966)
- Function 5 (1966)
- 5th Function (1966)
- Rhythm 1 (1967)
- Rhythm 2 (1967)
- Rhythm 3 (1967)
- Module 1 (1967)
- Module 2 (1967)
- Module 3 (1967)
- Module 4 (1967)
- Module 5 (1967)
- Interference 1 (1968)
- Interference 2 (1968)
- Dynamics 1 (1968)
- Masse 1 (1968)
- Masse 2 (1968)
- Freq Mod 1 (1969)
- Freq Mod 2 (1969)
- Imp & Ritha (1970)
- Environ (1970)
- Collections (1970)
- Eco 1 (1971)
- Filter 1 (1971)
- Taras on 3 (1971)
- Immagini per Diana Baylon (1972)
- Computer 1800 (1972)
- Hardlag (1972)
- With the light pen (1976)
- noch atmen (1980) (second prize in Bourges),
- Geometry in motion (1982)
- Almost a Haiku (1987)
- Polifonie di Novembre (1988)

=== Discography ===
Teresa Rampazzi published only two pieces during her lifetime:

- Fluxus (1979) LP EDI-PAN PRC S 20-16, Roma, 1984.
- Atmen noch (1980), special mention at the 8th International Concourse of Electroacoustics Music, Bourges (France): collection of winning pieces.

The first box set of her music was released in 2009, including the first time publication of "Musica Endoscopica" composed for a documentary on endoscopy, followed by other issues.

- Musica Endoscopica, Teresa Rampazzi, DIE SCHACHTEL (2009)
- Gruppo NPS Nuove Proposte Sonore 1965-1972, Teresa Rampazzi, Ennio Chiggio et al., DIE SCHACHTEL, DS23 (2011)
- Immagini per Diana Baylon, Teresa Rampazzi, DIE SCHACHTEL, DS30 (2016)
