= Etro Anime =

American electronic band

- Origin: New York City
- Genres: Electronica; trip hop; downtempo; breakbeat
- Years active: 1998–2010
- Labels: EMI; Neurodisk Records
- Past members: David Fisher; Tom Welsh; Shambo Pfaff; Liset Alea; Anais Alonzo; Ted Birkey; Harold Davis Jr. Thom Bell; Gregg Jarvis
- Website: etroanime.bandcamp.com

Etro Anime was an electronic band from New York City formed in 1998. Musical genres used by the band include drum and bass and trip hop, as well as deep house, downtempo, and breakbeat. The name "Etro Anime" means "to be infinite in spirit and in movement."

As of 2010, the band consisted of Anais Alonso, Ted Birkey, Harold Davis Jr., Thom Bell, and Gregg Jarvis. Previous members include David Fisher, Tom Welsch, Shambo Pfaff, and Liset Alea, who recorded a solo album for EMI titled No Sleep after leaving Etro Anime in 2005.

The band's 2002 album See the Sound featured Alea on vocals, David Fisher on sax, and Ted Birkey on keyboards.

Etro Anime's single "Danger" was used as the introductory music for the US version of the video game Shin Megami Tensei: Digital Devil Saga.

== History ==
Etro Anime cultivated a loyal fan base by translating their studio work into well-executed performances where samples intertwined with live drums, bass, keyboards, sax and trumpet, supported former lead singer Liset Alea on stage. While playing clubs such as Izzy Bar and Mercury Lounge, the lineup included programmer/sax/trumpeter David Fisher, programmer/keyboardist Ted Birkey, bassist Tom Welsch, bassist Charles Becker and drummer Shambo Pfaff. The band also included guitarist Kerry Trainor, who wrote and recorded with Etro through their first record.

They were one electronic group that prioritized their live sound first before actually tackling the recording studio. In 2002, they released their first self-produced full-length LP on Entry 1 Records distributed by V2 in Benelux to critical acclaim.

From the buzz, the band landed their first ever-European Show at the 2002 Amsterdam Dance Event. Hot on the heels of their remarkable live debut in The Netherlands, Etro secured a support slot on Kosheen's sell out 2002 tour of Austria and Germany. The band made a swift return to the mainland European stage for an appearance at the 2-Day Frequency Festival in Salzburg, Austria. Etro Anime shared the Alternative Tent along with Kosheen, Sneaker Pimps, and Das Pop. They finished the year supporting the Frenchman, DJ Llorca and signed a publishing deal with Chrysalis Records.

Early in 2003, Liset, Ted, and Dave worked in Amsterdam with Dutch Dance phenom John Kanselaar and finished two singles to add to the album while developing new tracks for Etro's next release. Liset took advantage of the opportunity to tour with French DJ, Alex Kid later that summer and ultimately left the band to pursue her solo career.

In early 2004, Neurodisc Records picked up "See the Sound" along with the Maxi-Single Summer Rain for the U.S. release. Capitalizing on the US dance market, the first single, "Summer Rain" climbed to no. 20 on the U.S. Dance charts in March 2004. After spending a year and a half searching for Liset's replacement, the group has finished their next release for the fall of 2008 featuring their coveted new band member, co-writer, and vocalist Anais Alonso.

Their second full-length album "Spreading Silence" was released via digital distribution, March 15, 2010, at etroanime.bandcamp.com on Neurodisc/Universal Records featuring additional vocalists Jeff Baldwin, Katy Gunn, Shatta Mejia, and Jessie Nieuwenhuis, and additional production from Jeff Baldwin, David Fisher, John Kanselaar, Keith Schweitzer, Joe Tagliareni, Matt Vacca and Malik Worthy.

== Discography ==
Date of release	Title	Label	Catalogue Number
September 2, 2002	See The Sound	Entry 1	E1R0010
Janurary 1, 2004	Summer Rain	Entry 1	[?]
March 15, 2010	Spreading Silence	Neurodisc Records	[None]
