= Dani Deahl =

American music producer

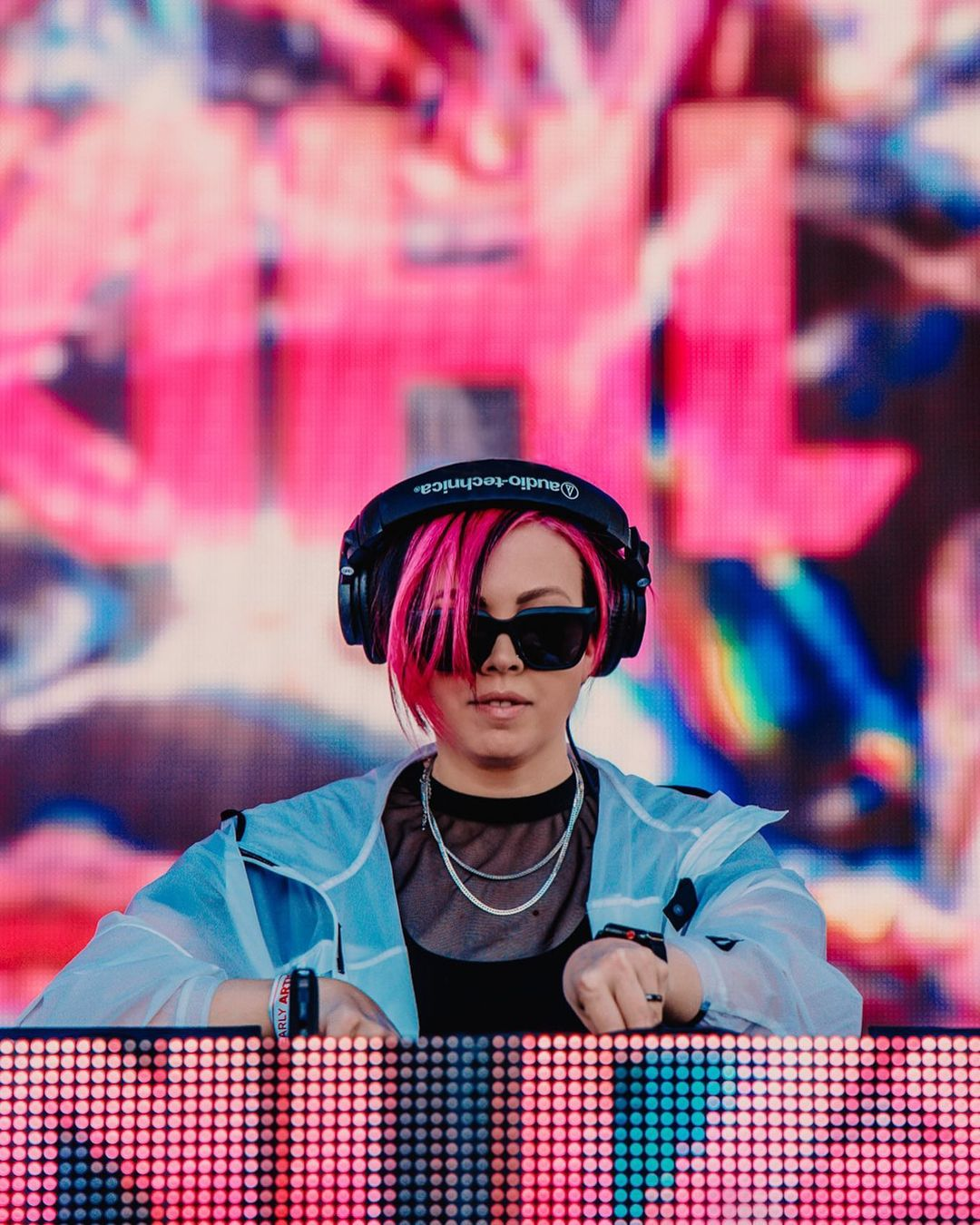
- Dani Deahl DJing at North Coast Music Festival in 2021

Background information
- Born: Dani Deahl Chicago, Illinois, U.S.
- Genres: house, tech house, EDM
- Occupations: DJ; record producer; advocate; music executive; public speaker; journalist
- Years active: 2007–present
- Labels: Monstercat, Armada Music, Dim Mak, Cr2, Flamingo, Play Me Records, Detour Recordings, Red Stick, Royal One
- Website: danideahl.com

Dani Deahl is a Chicago based EDM, & House music producer, DJ, journalist, and blogger. She was the producer of a Billboard charted song and ran the music blog DSquared from 2009–2015.

== Early life ==
Born and raised in Chicago, Illinois, Deahl became a DJ and got her first few residencies while she was still attending high school. In 2006, Deahl became producer and co-host of Red Bar Radio, the first internet podcast to be syndicated on terrestrial radio. Since that time, she's expanded into music production, journalism, and blogging. Deahl started her writing career as a contributor for Urb and shortly thereafter became their House Section Editor. She has also contributed to Chinashop (Red Bull's magazine), Time Out, Mateo, BPM, Complex, and Vice. Deahl's blog, DSquared, started in 2009.

== Career ==
=== TEDx ===
In 2014, Deahl did a highly publicized TEDx talk titled "Women, STEM & EDM." Deahl spoke in regards to her role as a female in the electronic music industry, where she discussed the challenges and inequalities faced by women in dance and electronic music. Her talk remains a significant contribution to discussions on gender equity within the industry.

=== SMYK (Show Me Your Kitties Tour) ===
Deahl's "Show Me Your Kitties" tour was a tour that consisted of 30 shows all promoted, ticked, and planned out by staff and assistants of the tour. Deahl had stated that because she was a female DJ, she was finding it difficult to get booked and promoted for shows. In response to that, she made an active effort to self sustain the tour, from creating a ticketing service that allowed customers to also donate to a nonprofit big cat rescue charity, to booking and promoting shows without promoters.

=== DJ Mag ===
As of 2016, Deahl had taken up a role as an editor for popular music magazine DJ Mag. She said in an interview that she had written pieces for the magazine and then eventually was offered a position.

== Recognition and awards ==
Deahl’s contributions have been widely recognized. She was a recipient of the Alternative Power 100 Music List in 2020, which honors individuals who challenge conventional industry standards and support underrepresented communities.

Additionally, her work as a DJ and producer has earned her consistent rankings among the top 100 female DJs in the U.S. from 2017 to 2023.

== Personal life ==
Deahl is married to DJ Fei Tang. They were married on May 5, 2013, at the historic Gramaphone Records in Chicago.
