= Elizabeth Hayden Pizer =

American classical composer

Elizabeth Faw Hayden Pizer (born September 1, 1954) is an American composer, music journalist, archivist and broadcast producer. She was born in Watertown, New York, and studied at the Boston Conservatory of Music in Boston, Massachusetts. Hayden married musician and composer Charles Pizer. She was awarded the First Prize in the 1982 Delius Composition Contest.

== Works ==
Selected works include:

- Elegy for Strings for string orchestra (or string quartet) (1977/79)
- Fanfare Overture for symphonic band (1977/79)
- Look Down, Fair Moon for voice & piano (1976)
- Quilisoly for flute & piano, or violin & piano (1976)
- String Quartet (1981)
- Five Haiku for soprano & chamber ensemble (or soprano & piano reduction) (1978)
- Five Haiku, II for mezzo-soprano & piano (1979)
- Ten Haiku for saxophone & piano (1978/79; arr. 1983)
- Nightsongs for medium voice & piano (texts by Milton Drake) (1986)
- Shakespeare Set for unaccompanied voice (1978–87)
- Sunken Flutes (electronic tape) (1979)
- Arlington (electronic tape) (1989)
- Embryonic Climactus (electronic tape) (1989)
- The Infinite Sea for electronic tape, or electronic tape & narrator (1990)
- Aquasphere (electronic tape) (1990)

Her work has been recorded and issued on CD, including:

- Romantics: American Piano Music (1992) North/South Recordings
- Desertscapes -- Music of American Women Composer (1997) MMC Recordings
- New American Piano Music (2001) Innova Recordings

Pizer has published books including:

- Music of the Ancient Near East (New York, 1954)
