= Arkhon Infaustus =

French blackened death metal band

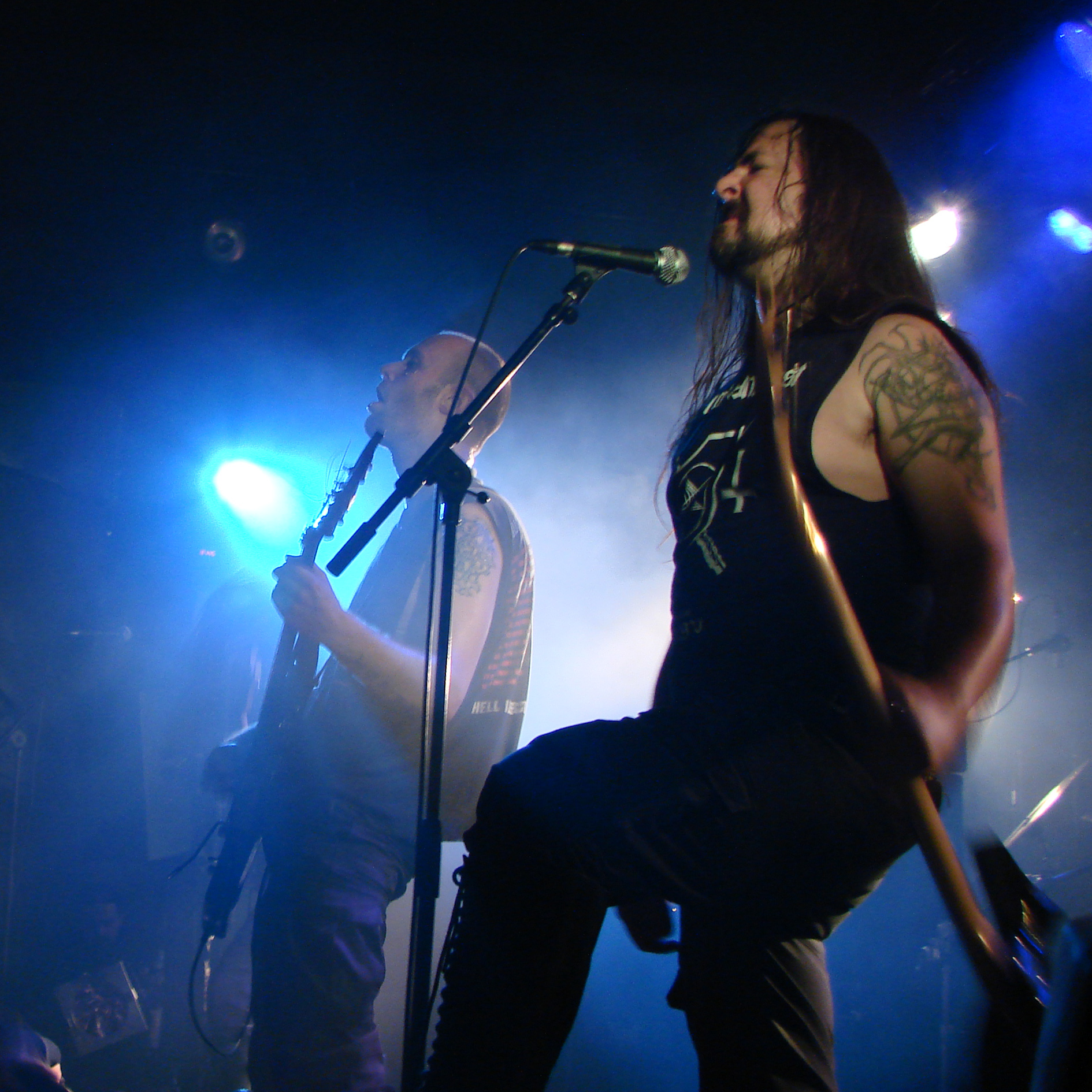

Background information
- Origin: Paris, France
- Genre: Blackened death metal
- Years active: 1997–present
- Labels: Mordgrimm; Osmose Productions
- Members: Dk Deviant / Kwel / EsX
- Past members: Hellblaster; Toxik H. Azk.6
- Website: arkhon-infaustus.com

Arkhon Infaustus is a French blackened death metal band from Paris. They formed in 1997, are signed to Osmose Productions, and have released four albums.

== History ==
Arkon Infaustus was created in late 1997 by Dk Deviant, joined by Torturer. They released the EP In Sperma Infernum through Mordgrimm, limited to 666 copies. They signed to Spikekult Records and released the EP Dead Cunt Maniac in 2000. This got them signed to Osmose Productions. Their first album, Hell Injection, was released in 2001 and limited to 500 copies. After their second album, Filth Catalyst (2002), they toured with Mortician. They recorded a split with black metal band Revenge and toured Europe with Vader.

In 2004, they released Perdition Insanabilis and toured Europe with Deicide, and again in 2005 with Belphegor and In Aeternum. In 2007, they released the EP Annunciation and the album Orthodoxyn, and in April and May 2008 toured Europe with Angelcorpse.

In 2017, the band released the EP Passing the Nekromanteion.

== Musical style ==
Arkhon Infaustus use distorted raspy vocals, double bass, and synthesizers to play a style of black/death metal similar to that of Angelcorpse. Their lyrics usually deal with Satanism, sex, anti-Christianity, and general acts of debauchery.

== Members ==
=== Current members ===
- Dk Deviant – bass, vocals (1997-)
- Sylvain "Skvm" Butet – drums (2017-)

=== Former members ===
- Guillaume "666 Torturer" Warren – bass, vocals (1997–2009)
- Yov "Hellblaster" – drums (1999–2002)
- Damien "Toxik H." Guimard – guitar (2001–2009)
- Jonathan "Azk.6" Boyer – drums (2002–2009)
- I. Luciferia – guitar (2014–2015)

== Discography ==
- In Sperma Infernum (EP, Mordgrimm, 1998)
- Dead Cunt Maniac (EP, Spikekult, 2000)
- Hell Injection (CD, Osmose, 2001)
- Filth Catalyst (CD, Osmose, 2003)
- Arkhon Infaustus/Revenge (Split CD, Osmose, 2003)
- Perdition Insanabilis (CD, Osmose, 2004)
- Annunciation (EP, Osmose, 2007)
- Orthodoxyn (CD, Osmose, 2007)
- Passing The Nekromanteion (CD, LP, Les Acteurs De L'Ombre Productions, 2017)
