= Helmuth Lehner =

Austrian musician

Helmuth
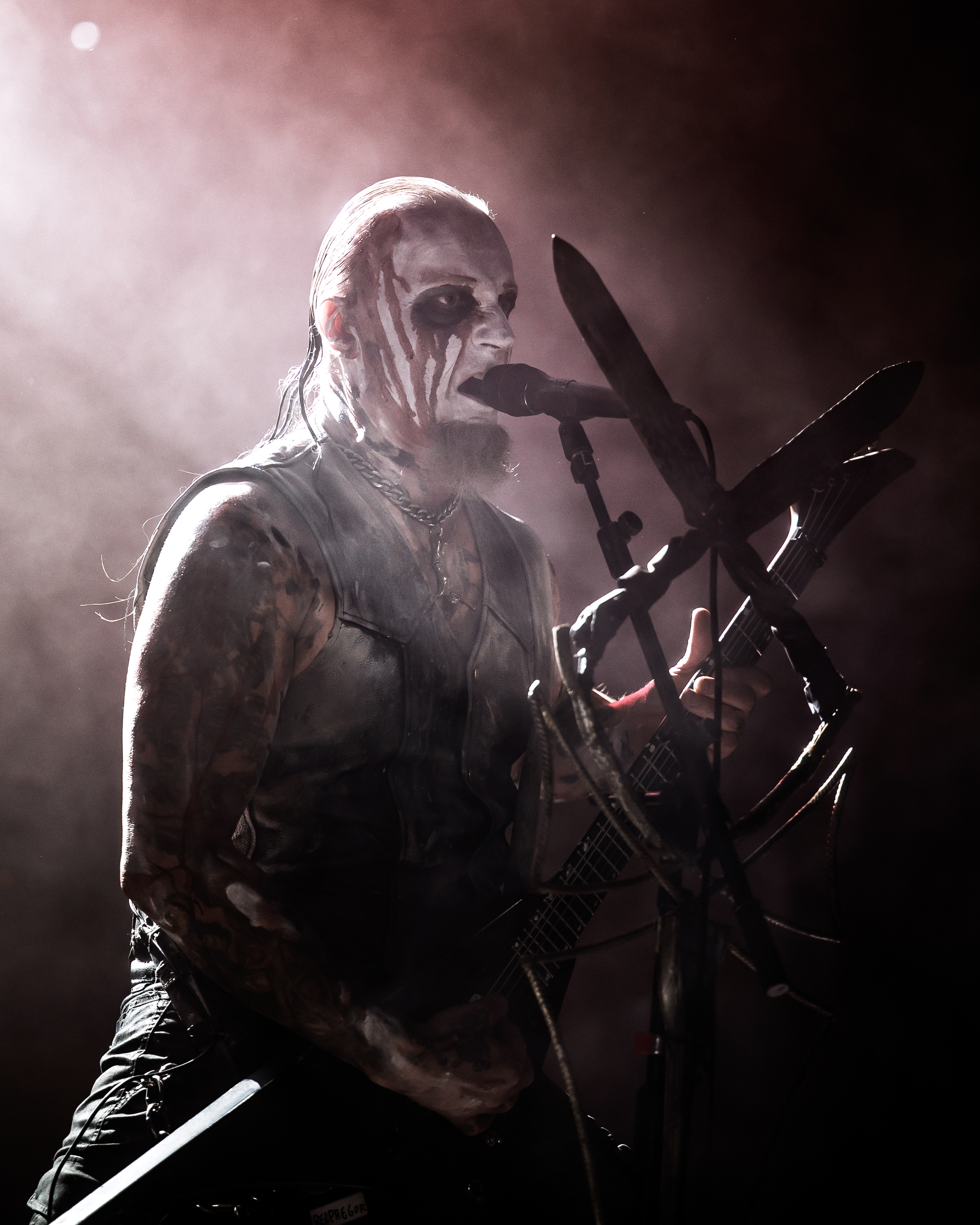
- Lehner with Belphegor at Tons of Rock, 2025

Background information
- Also known as: Hel Lennart
- Born: 7 December 1968 (age 57); Korneuburg, Austria
- Origin: Salzburg, Austria
- Genres: Black metal, death metal, heavy metal, thrash metal
- Occupations: Musician, songwriter
- Instruments: Vocals, guitar
- Years active: 1979–present
- Website: belphegor.at

Helmuth Lehner (born 7 December 1968) is an Austrian musician, best known as the vocalist and guitarist of the black/death metal band Belphegor. Prior to Belphegor, he was in the heavy metal band Speed Limit, where he was known as Hel Lennart.

== Equipment ==
Lehner is an avid user of Jackson Guitars. He has been seen using the RR24 and the DKMG.

== Health ==
In 2011, Lehner contracted typhoid fever during Belphegor's South American tour, which he believed he acquired after accidentally drinking contaminated water from the sink. He survived the infection and recovered after six weeks of rehabilitation. He stated that the event inspired him to write the album Conjuring the Dead.

== Discography ==
- Speed Limit – Prophecy (EP, 1988, Breakin' Records)
