= List of songs recorded by Nirvana =

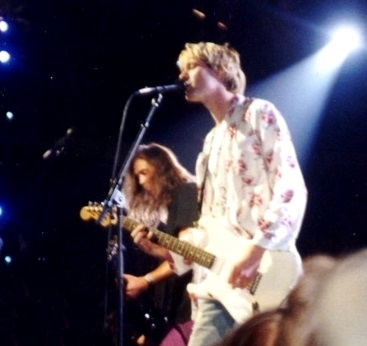
Kurt Cobain (foreground) and Krist Novoselic live at the 1992 MTV Video Music Awards

Nirvana was an American grunge band formed by singer and guitarist Kurt Cobain and bassist Krist Novoselic in Aberdeen, Washington in 1987, with drummer Dave Grohl joining the band in 1990.

The band recorded three studio albums; Bleach, Nevermind and In Utero, with other songs available on live albums, compilations, extended plays (EPs), singles and reissues. Other songs have surfaced or are known to exist but have not been released officially.

== Songs ==
Key
†	Indicates song not written or co-written by Kurt Cobain
‡	Indicates song released as a single
#	Indicates song made by The Jury, a side project between Nirvana's Cobain and Novoselic and Screaming Trees singer Mark Lanegan and drummer Mark Pickerel

Name of song, writer(s), original release, producer(s) and year of release
Song	Writer(s)	Original release	Producer(s)	Year	Ref(s).
"About a Girl" ‡ (Note: Released as a promotional single; "On a Plain" released from Nevermind; "Lake of Fire", "The Man Who Sold the World", and "Where Did you Sleep Last Night?" released from MTV Unplugged in New York; and "Aneurysm" and "Drain You" released from the album From the Muddy Banks of the Wishkah. "About a Girl" released as both a promotional and a retail single, with both versions containing the song from MTV Unplugged in New York. "In Bloom" released as both a promotional and a retail single. "Heart-Shaped Box" released as both a promotional and a retail single. "All Apologies" released as both a promotional and a retail single, with the United States' promotional copy containing both the song from MTV Unplugged in New York and the version from In Utero.)	Kurt Cobain	Bleach	Jack Endino	1989	
"Aero Zeppelin"	Kurt Cobain	Incesticide	Jack Endino	1992	
"Ain't It a Shame" #	Traditional †	With the Lights Out	Jack Endino	2004	
"All Apologies" ‡	Kurt Cobain	In Utero	Steve Albini	1993	
"Aneurysm" ‡	Kurt Cobain; Dave Grohl; Krist Novoselic	(B-side to "Smells Like Teen Spirit")	Craig Montgomery	1991	
"Anorexorcist"	Kurt Cobain	With the Lights Out	John Goodmanson (Note: Goodmanson is only listed as an engineer for "Anorexorcist", "Help Me I'm Hungry", and "White Lace and Strange" in the album's liner notes. Although, Everett True, in a 2009 biography, stated that Nirvana performed the session with "producer John Goodmanson".)	2004	
"Beans"	Kurt Cobain	With the Lights Out	–	2004	
"Been a Son"	Kurt Cobain	(B-side to Blew EP)	Steve Fisk	1989	
"Beeswax"	Kurt Cobain	Kill Rock Stars	Jack Endino	1991	
"Big Cheese"	Kurt Cobain	(B-side to "Love Buzz")	Jack Endino	1988	
"Big Long Now"	Kurt Cobain	Incesticide	Jack Endino	1992	
"Big Me" †	Dave Grohl	–	Adam Kasper	Unreleased (Note: According to music journalist and author Gillian G. Gaar, "Big Me", "Butterflies", "Chris w/Acoustic", "Dave w/Echoplex", "Exhausted", "February Stars", "French Abortion", "Jam After Dinner", "New Beat / In Cars", "New Wave Groove", "Skid Mark", and "Thrash Tune" were recorded during a session from January 28–30, 1994, at Robert Lang Studios in Seattle. Author and music journalist Charles R. Cross cites the title of "Skid Mark" as "Skid-marks", and the title of "Butterflies" as "Butterfly".)	
"Blandest"	Kurt Cobain	With the Lights Out	Jack Endino	2004	
"Blew"	Kurt Cobain	Bleach	Jack Endino	1989	
"Breed" (aka "Imodium")	Kurt Cobain (Note: The original release of Nevermind credited all songs to Kurt Cobain, Dave Grohl, and Krist Novoselic. Later releases credit the song solely to Cobain.)	Nevermind	Butch Vig; Nirvana	1991	
"Butterflies"	Unknown	–	Adam Kasper	Unreleased	
"Chris w/Acoustic"	Unknown	–	Adam Kasper	Unreleased	
"Clean Up Before She Comes"	Kurt Cobain	With the Lights Out	–	2004	
"Come as You Are" ‡	Kurt Cobain	Nevermind	Butch Vig; Nirvana	1991	
"Curmudgeon"	Kurt Cobain; Dave Grohl; Krist Novoselic	(B-side to "Lithium")}}	Barrett Jones	1992	
"D-7"	Greg Sage †	Hormoaning	Dale Griffin	1992	
"Dave w/Echoplex"	Unknown	–	Adam Kasper	Unreleased	
"Dive"	Kurt Cobain; Krist Novoselic	(B-side to "Sliver")	Butch Vig	1990	
"Do Re Mi"	Kurt Cobain	With the Lights Out	–	2004	
"Do You Love Me?"	Bob Ezrin; Kim Fowley; Paul Stanley †	Hard to Believe: A Kiss Covers Compilation	Greg Babior	1990	
"Don't Want It All"	Kurt Cobain	With the Lights Out	–	2004	
"Downer"	Kurt Cobain; Krist Novoselic	Bleach (1990 re-release)	Jack Endino	1990	
"Drain You" ‡	Kurt Cobain	Nevermind	Butch Vig; Nirvana	1991	
"Dumb"	Kurt Cobain	In Utero	Steve Albini	1993	
"E.Coli"	Unknown	–	–	Unreleased (Note: Nine-minute demo of a song that leaked in August 2015.)	
"Endless, Nameless"	Kurt Cobain	Nevermind (second pressing)	Butch Vig; Nirvana	1991	
"Escalator to Hell"	Unknown	–	–	Unreleased (Note: Eighty-nine second recording leaked on the Outcesticide recordings.)	
"Even In His Youth"	Kurt Cobain; Dave Grohl; Krist Novoselic	(B-side to "Smells Like Teen Spirit")	Craig Montgomery	1991	
"Exhausted" †	Dave Grohl	–	Adam Kasper	Unreleased	
"February Stars" (originally titled "Dave/Acoustic + Voc") †	Dave Grohl	–	Adam Kasper	Unreleased	
"Floyd the Barber"	Kurt Cobain	Bleach	Jack Endino	1989	
"Forgotten Tune"	Kurt Cobain	In Utero (2013 Super Deluxe edition)	Barrett Jones	2013	
"Frances Farmer Will Have Her Revenge on Seattle"	Kurt Cobain	In Utero	Steve Albini	1993	
"French Abortion"	Unknown	–	Adam Kasper	Unreleased	
"Gallons of Rubbing Alcohol Flow Through the Strip"	Kurt Cobain; Dave Grohl; Krist Novoselic	In Utero	Craig Montgomery	1993	
"Grey Goose" #	Traditional †	With the Lights Out	Jack Endino	2004	
"Gypsys, Tramps & Thieves"	Bob Stone †	–	–	Unreleased (Note: Recorded from a 1987 rehearsal)	
"Hairspray Queen"	Kurt Cobain	Incesticide	Jack Endino	1992	
"Heart-Shaped Box" ‡	Kurt Cobain	In Utero	Steve Albini	1993	
"Heartbreaker"	John Bonham; John Paul Jones; Jimmy Page; Robert Plant †	With the Lights Out	–	2004	
"Here She Comes Now"	John Cale; Sterling Morrison; Lou Reed; Moe Tucker †	Heaven & Hell: A Tribute to the Velvet Underground	Butch Vig	1991	
"Help Me I'm Hungry"	Kurt Cobain	With the Lights Out	John Goodmanson	2004	
"I Hate Myself and Want to Die"	Kurt Cobain	The Beavis and Butt-Head Experience	Steve Albini	1993	
"If You Must"	Kurt Cobain	With the Lights Out	Jack Endino	2004	
"Immigrant Song"	Jimmy Page; Robert Plant †	With the Lights Out	–	2004	
"In Bloom" ‡	Kurt Cobain	Nevermind	Butch Vig; Nirvana	1991	
"Jam"	Kurt Cobain	In Utero (2013 Super Deluxe edition)	Jack Endino	2013	
"Jam After Dinner"	Unknown	–	Adam Kasper	Unreleased	
"Jesus Doesn't Want Me For A Sunbeam"	Eugene Kelly; Frances McKee †	MTV Unplugged in New York	Alex Coletti; Scott Litt; Nirvana	1994	
"Lake of Fire" ‡	Curt Kirkwood †	MTV Unplugged in New York	Alex Coletti; Scott Litt; Nirvana	1994	
"The Landlord is a Piece of Shit from Hell"	Unknown	–	–	Unreleased (Note: Song from a practice session in spring 1987 with Novoselic on vocals)	
"Lithium" ‡	Kurt Cobain	Nevermind	Butch Vig; Nirvana	1991	
"Lounge Act"	Kurt Cobain	Nevermind	Butch Vig; Nirvana	1991	
"Love Buzz" ‡	Robbie van Leeuwen †	Bleach	Jack Endino	1988	
"Lullaby"	Unknown	–	Unknown	Unreleased (Note: Taken from a session dated February 15, 1993, at Pachyderm Studios, and leaked after a buyer purchased a reel containing seven Nirvana recordings from Pachyderm on eBay.)	
"The Man Who Sold the World" ‡	David Bowie †	MTV Unplugged in New York	Alex Coletti; Scott Litt; Nirvana	1994	
"Marigold"	Dave Grohl †	(B-side to "Heart-Shaped Box")	Steve Albini	1993	
"Mexican Seafood"	Kurt Cobain	Teriyaki Asthma Volume 1	Jack Endino	1989	
"Milk It"	Kurt Cobain	In Utero	Steve Albini	1993	
"Raunchola / Moby Dick"	John Bonham; Kurt Cobain; John Paul Jones; Jimmy Page	With the Lights Out	–	2004	
"Moist Vagina"	Kurt Cobain	(B-side to "All Apologies / Rape Me")	Steve Albini	1993	
"Molly's Lips"	Eugene Kelly; Frances McKee †	Non-album single (Split single with "Candy")	Dale Griffin	1991	
"The Money Will Roll Right In"	Tom Flynn †	Live at Reading	Nirvana	2009	
"More Than a Feeling" (Note: Not included on the Live at Reading CD; included as a part of "Smells Like Teen Spirit" on the Live at Reading DVD. Not given its own track listing.)	Tom Scholz	Live at Reading (DVD version)	Nirvana	2009	
"Mr. Moustache"	Kurt Cobain	Bleach	Jack Endino	1989	
"Mrs. Butterworth"	Kurt Cobain	With the Lights Out	–	2004	
"My Best Friend's Girl"	Ric Ocasek †	Live and Loud	–	2013	
"Negative Creep"	Kurt Cobain	Bleach	Jack Endino	1989	
"New Beat / In Cars"	Unknown	–	Adam Kasper	Unreleased	
"New Wave Groove"	Unknown	–	Adam Kasper	Unreleased	
"Oh, Me"	Curt Kirkwood †	MTV Unplugged in New York	Alex Coletti; Scott Litt; Nirvana	1994	
"Oh, the Guilt"	Kurt Cobain	Non-album single (Split single with "Puss")	Barrett Jones	1992	
"Old Age"	Kurt Cobain	With the Lights Out	Butch Vig	2004	
"On a Plain" ‡	Kurt Cobain	Nevermind	Butch Vig; Nirvana	1991	
"Onward Into Countless Battles"	Johnny Hedlund (Unleashed cover)	–	Craig Montgomery	Unreleased (Note: Also known as "Meat" or "Dave's Meat Song"; recorded with Craig Montgomery at BMG-Ariola in Rio de Janeiro, with Dave Grohl playing all instruments.)	
"Opinion"	Kurt Cobain	With the Lights Out	–	2004	
"The Other Improv"	Kurt Cobain	With the Lights Out	Craig Montgomery	2004	
"Paper Cuts"	Kurt Cobain	Bleach	Jack Endino	1989	
"Pen Cap Chew"	Kurt Cobain	With the Lights Out	Jack Endino	2004	
"Pennyroyal Tea" ‡	Kurt Cobain	In Utero	Steve Albini	1993	
"Plateau"	Curt Kirkwood †	MTV Unplugged in New York	Alex Coletti; Scott Litt; Nirvana	1994	
"Polly"	Kurt Cobain	Nevermind	Butch Vig; Nirvana	1991	
"Radio Friendly Unit Shifter"	Kurt Cobain	In Utero	Steve Albini	1993	
"Rape Me" ‡	Kurt Cobain	In Utero	Steve Albini	1993	
"Run Rabbit Run"	Manchuria, Claude	–	–	Unreleased	
"Return of the Rat"	Greg Sage †	Eight Songs for Greg Sage and the Wipers	Barrett Jones	1992	
"Sappy"	Kurt Cobain	No Alternative (Note: Listed as "Verse Chorus Verse" on No Alternative)	Steve Albini	1993	
"Scentless Apprentice"	Kurt Cobain; Dave Grohl; Krist Novoselic	In Utero	Steve Albini	1993	
"School"	Kurt Cobain	Bleach	Jack Endino	1989	
"Scoff"	Kurt Cobain	Bleach	Jack Endino	1989	
"Seasons in the Sun"	Jacques Brel; Rod McKuen †	With the Lights Out	–	2004	
"Serve the Servants"	Kurt Cobain	In Utero	Steve Albini	1993	
"Should I Stay or Should I Go"	The Clash †	–	–	Unreleased (Note: According to Gaar, Cobain, Eric Erlandson and Pat Smear are said to have recorded a cover of "Should I Stay or Should I Go" on March 25, 1994, after a drug intervention at Cobain's home, with Cobain playing drums, Smear playing guitar, and Erlandson playing bass.)	
"Sifting"	Kurt Cobain	Bleach	Jack Endino	1989	
"Skid Mark"	Unknown	–	Adam Kasper	Unreleased	
"Sliver" ‡	Kurt Cobain; Krist Novoselic	Non-album single	Jack Endino	1990	
"Smells Like Teen Spirit" ‡	Kurt Cobain; Dave Grohl; Krist Novoselic	Nevermind	Butch Vig; Nirvana	1991	
"Something in the Way"	Kurt Cobain	Nevermind	Butch Vig; Nirvana	1991	
"Son of a Gun"	Eugene Kelly; Frances McKee †	Hormoaning	Dale Griffin	1992	
"Song in D"	Unknown	–	Butch Vig	Unreleased (Note: Possibly unrecorded; according to Cross and Jim Berkenstadt, there "are no track sheets to reflect that 'Song in D' was ever formally recorded". Rehearsed by the band at Sound City, and described by producer Butch Vig as "somewhat like an R.E.M. song". In a 2011 interview, Vig stated the song, set in "D" tuning, was never finished.)	
"Spank Thru"	Kurt Cobain	Sub Pop 200	Jack Endino	1988	
"Stain"	Kurt Cobain	(B-side to Blew EP)	Steve Fisk	1989	
"Stay Away"	Kurt Cobain	Nevermind	Butch Vig; Nirvana	1991	
"Swap Meet"	Kurt Cobain	Bleach	Jack Endino	1989	
"Talk to Me"	Kurt Cobain	With the Lights Out	–	2004	
"Territorial Pissings"	Kurt Cobain; Chet Powers (Note: The original release of Nevermind credited the song to Kurt Cobain, Dave Grohl, and Krist Novoselic. Later releases credit the song to Cobain and Chet Powers.)	Nevermind	Butch Vig; Nirvana	1991	
"They Hung Him on a Cross" #	Traditional †	With the Lights Out	Jack Endino	2004	
"Thrash Tune"	Unknown	–	Adam Kasper	Unreleased	
"Token Eastern Song"	Kurt Cobain	With the Lights Out	Steve Fisk	2004	
"Tourette's"	Kurt Cobain	In Utero	Steve Albini	1993	
"Turnaround"	Gerald Casale; Mark Mothersbaugh †	Hormoaning	Dale Griffin	1992	
"Verse Chorus Verse"	Kurt Cobain	With the Lights Out	Butch Vig	2004	
"Very Ape"	Kurt Cobain	In Utero	Steve Albini	1993	
"Where Did You Sleep Last Night?" ‡	Traditional † (Note: The liner notes for MTV Unplugged in New York credit Huddie Ledbetter as the writer of the song.)	MTV Unplugged in New York	Alex Coletti; Scott Litt; Nirvana	1994	
"White Lace and Strange"	Kurt Cobain	With the Lights Out	John Goodmanson	2004	
"You Know You're Right" ‡	Kurt Cobain	Nirvana	Adam Kasper	2002	
Untitled (Nicknamed "Dave Solo")	Unknown	–	Unknown	Unreleased	
Untitled	Unknown	–	–	Unreleased (Note: Recorded at a radio session in the Netherlands in 1991; described by a DJ present at the recording as "very quiet and miserable".)	
Untitled	Unknown	–	–	Unreleased (Note: Taken from a 1987 rehearsal)	
Untitled	Unknown	–	–	Unreleased	

== See also ==
- Nirvana discography
- Nirvana bootleg recordings

== Bibliography ==
- Berkenstadt, Jim; Cross, Charles R. (2012). Classic Rock Albums: Nirvana – Nevermind. Schirmer Trade Books. ISBN 9780857127686.
- Cross, Charles R. (2016). Kurt Cobain and Nirvana – Updated Edition: The Complete Illustrated History. Voyageur Press. ISBN 9780760352557.
- Gaar, Gillian G. (2006). Nirvana's In Utero. Bloomsbury Publishing. ISBN 9781441186096.
- –. The Rough Guide to Nirvana. Rough Guides Limited. 2009. ISBN 9781405381123.
- Thompson, Dave (2000). Alternative Rock: Third Ear – The Essential Listening Companion. Miller Freeman Books. ISBN 9780879306076.
- Saint Thomas, Kurt; Smith, Troy (2004). Nirvana: The Chosen Rejects. Macmillan. ISBN 9780312206635.
