= Dive (Nirvana song) =

- US picture sleeve

Song by Nirvana

from the album the Grunge Years and Incesticide
- A-side: "Sliver"
- Released: September 1, 1990
- Recorded: April 1990
- Genre: Grunge
- Length: 3:55
- Label: Sub Pop
- Songwriters: Kurt Cobain; Krist Novoselic
- Producer: Butch Vig

"Dive" is a song by the American rock band Nirvana, written by vocalist and guitarist Kurt Cobain and bassist Krist Novoselic. It was released as the B-side to the band's second single, "Sliver" in September 1990. The same version was re-released as the opening track on the compilation album The Grunge Years in 1991, and again on the Nirvana rarities compilation, Incesticide, in December 1992.

== Origin and recording ==
=== Early history ===
"Dive" was first recorded in the studio in the spring of 1989 at Evergreen State College in Olympia, Washington. The session was produced by Evergreen student Greg Babior, and was the band's only studio session with second guitarist Jason Everman, who was credited on their 1989 debut album, Bleach, but did not play on it. The session also resulted in a cover of the Kiss song "Do You Love Me?", which was released on Hard to Believe: A Kiss Covers Compilation in 1990. However, this version of "Dive" remained unreleased until its appearance on the Nirvana box set, With the Lights Out, in November 2004.

"Dive" was performed for the first time live on May 26, 1989 at the Lindbloom Student Centre of Green River Community College in Auburn, Washington. On November 1, 1989, it was recorded along with "About a Girl" and "Love Buzz" for the VPRO radio show Nozems-a-Go-Go at Villa 65 in Hilversum, Netherlands.

=== "Sliver" single ===
A second studio version was recorded by Butch Vig, who later produced the band's breakthrough album, Nevermind, in April 1990 at Smart Studios in Madison, Wisconsin. This version was released twice by the band's then-label, Sub Pop, first as the B-side to the "Sliver" single in September 1990, and then on the compilation album The Grunge Years in June 1991.

=== Post-"Sliver" single ===
In December 1992, the same version of "Dive" was re-released by DGC Records, the major label the band had signed with in 1991, on the Nirvana rarities compilation, Incesticide. As on the "Sliver" single, it appeared back-to-back with "Sliver," but was the album's opening track.

The final live rendition of "Dive" was an impromptu version played at the James A. Rhodes Arena in Akron, Ohio on October 31, 1993.

== Composition and lyrics ==
Nirvana biographer Michael Azerrad described "Dive" as possessing "the best elements of Bleach - the grinding guitar sound, the high, desperate growling vocals, the deliciously laden riff" and wrote that "it was pop music, but very, very heavy pop music." Journalist Gillian G. Garr theorized that had "Dive" not been included on the "Sliver" single, it may have been re-recorded for the band's September 1991 release Nevermind, since it predicted that album's sound with its fusion of punk, metal and pop. According to Garr, the song's lyrics feature a braggadocio absent from other Nirvana songs. Author Chuck Crisafulli described the song as having the "thick, dirty guitar, menacing bass and vocals of intermediate agony" that characterized the still-new "grunge" genre at the time.

== Release and reception ==
The "Sliver" single was first released on 7-inch vinyl in the US in 1990 by Sub Pop. The initial run of 3,000 copies was pressed on black, marbled blue, or clear pink vinyl. It was released on CD single, 7-inch vinyl and 12-inch vinyl in the UK in 1991 on the Tupelo record label.

Reviewing Incesticide for Entertainment Weekly in December 1992, David Browne described "Dive" as "a 1988 pile driver" that "embodies everything wonderful about Nirvana: the one-two-three punch of thudding guitar riffs, rubbery bass lines (Krist Novoselic is the band’s unheralded linchpin), and Cobain’s lozenge-craving roar fighting to be heard through layers of boredom and rage, which all combine to form something both cathartic and moving."

The single was re-released on silver 7-inch vinyl on 26 March 2021 by Jackpot Records and it is limited to 1,000 copies.

=== Legacy ===
In a July 2018 retrospective review of Incesticide, Pitchfork's Jenn Pelly wrote that "in the crests and punches and crashes of 'Dive,' Cobain shows all the contours and shapes he could carve with his voice," and that "like the best of Nirvana, 'Dive' validates pain while tacitly pulling you out from beneath it, depressive and buoyant in each breath, making the sunken feeling soar."

In 2015, "Dive" was ranked at number six on Rolling Stone's No Apologies: All 102 Nirvana Songs Ranked list, with Maura Johnston calling it "a tense and furtive pop song in spite of itself." In 2017, it was voted eight on Rolling Stones's reader's poll of non-album Nirvana songs.

According to the 2001 Cobain biography Heavier than Heaven by Charles R. Cross, Cobain's future wife, Courtney Love, was impressed with the song upon hearing the "Sliver" single for the first time, calling it "sexy, and sexual, and strange and haunting," and describing it as "genius."

== Charts ==
Chart (2015)	Peak position
UK Physical Singles Sales (OCC); Charted as "Sliver/Dive"	81

Chart (2024)	Peak position
UK Physical Singles Sales (OCC); Charted as "Sliver/Dive"	62

== Accolades ==
Year	Publication	Country	Accolade	Rank
1998	Kerrang!	United Kingdom	20 Great Nirvana Songs Picked by the Stars	19
2017	Rolling Stone	United States	Readers’ Poll: 10 Best Nirvana Deep Cuts	8
2020	Kerrang!	United Kingdom	The 20 Greatest Nirvana Songs - Ranked	20

== Personnel ==
Nirvana

- Kurt Cobain – vocals, guitars
- Krist Novoselic – bass
- Chad Channing – drums

== Other releases ==
- A live version, recorded at the Pine Street Theatre in Portland, Oregon on February 9, 1990, was released in November 2009, when the full Pine Street show appeared as bonus material on the 20th anniversary "Deluxe" version of Bleach.
- A live version, recorded on January 23, 1993 at the Hollywood Rock Festival at the Praça da Apoteose in Rio de Janeiro, Brazil, appeared on the live video, Live! Tonight! Sold Out!!, released in November 1994. Recorded during the show's encore, it featured Cobain performing the song in a slip and tiara, while Grohl wore a bra.

=== Unreleased versions ===
- The version recorded for the VPRO on November 1, 1989 has appeared on bootlegs such as Outcesticide III: The Final Solution, but remains unreleased.
- A live version, recorded at the London Astoria in London, England on December 3, 1989, was selected to appear on a live compilation titled Verse Chorus Verse, which was to include what became MTV Unplugged in New York and a second disc of live electric performances. However, the second disc was abandoned, and no version of "Dive" was included when Novoselic and Grohl later revisited the idea of a live album and compiled From the Muddy Banks of the Wishkah, released in November 1996.
