= List of awards and nominations received by Nirvana =

Nirvana awards and nominations
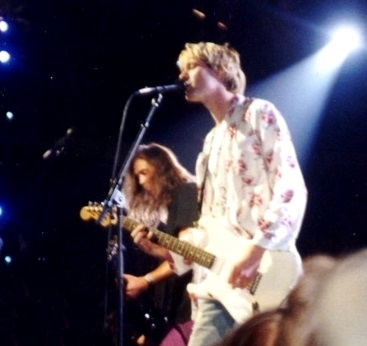
- Cobain and Novoselic at the 1992 MTV Video Music Awards
Awards and nominations
Award	Wins	Nominations
American Music Awards	1	2
Brit	1	3
Grammy	1	7
MTV VMA	5	10
NME	2	3

Totals (Note: Certain award groups do not simply award one winner. They acknowledge several different recipients, have runners-up, and have third place. Since this is a specific recognition and is different from losing an award, runner-up mentions are considered wins in this award tally. For simplification and to avoid errors, each award in this list has been presumed to have had a prior nomination.)
- Wins: 17
- Nominations: 27

Nirvana was an American rock band formed by singer/guitarist Kurt Cobain and bassist Krist Novoselic in Aberdeen, Washington. The band went through a succession of drummers and eventually settled on Dave Grohl, who joined the band in 1990. They have released three studio albums: Bleach (1989), Nevermind (1991), and In Utero (1993). The first album was released on the Sub Pop record label, while the remaining albums were released by DGC Records.

The band received several awards and nominations in their debut year in 1992, including nominations for Favorite New Heavy Metal/Hard Rock Artist from the American Music Awards, Best Alternative Music Performance for Nevermind from the Grammy Awards, and Video of the Year and Viewer's Choice for "Smells Like Teen Spirit" from the MTV Video Music Awards. They received the Best Alternative Video award for "Smells Like Teen Spirit" and Best New Artist from the MTV Video Music Awards in the same year. The song "Smells Like Teen Spirit" was also nominated for Best Rock Song at the 1993 Grammy Awards, but it lost to "Layla" by Eric Clapton. Clapton's win over Nirvana would later be named one of the "10 biggest upsets" in Grammy history by Entertainment Weekly. After receiving five nominations from the Grammy Awards without winning any of them, the band finally received the Best Alternative Music Performance award for MTV Unplugged In New York in 1996. Overall, Nirvana has received twelve awards from twenty-five nominations.

== American Music Awards ==
The American Music Awards is an annual awards ceremony created by Dick Clark in 1973. Nirvana has received one award from two nominations.

Year	Nominee / work	Award	Result
1992	Nirvana	Favorite New Heavy Metal/Hard Rock Artist	Nominated
1995	Nirvana	Favorite Heavy Metal/Hard Rock Artist	Won

== BMI Pop Awards ==
Year	Nominee / work	Award	Result	Ref.
1996	"About a Girl"	Award-Winning Song	Won	

== Billboard Music Awards ==
The Billboard Music Awards honor artists for commercial performance in the U.S., based on record charts published by Billboard. The awards are based on sales data by Nielsen SoundScan and radio information by Nielsen Broadcast Data Systems. The award ceremony was held from 1990 to 2007, until its reintroduction in 2011.

Year	Nominee / work	Award	Result
1994	Nirvana	Top Billboard 200 Artist - Duo/Group	Nominated

== Brit Awards ==
The Brit Awards are the British Phonographic Industry's annual pop music awards. Nirvana has won one award from three nominations.

Year	Nominee / work	Award	Result
1993	Nirvana	International Breakthrough Act	Won
1993	Nirvana	International Group	Nominated
1994	Nirvana	International Group	Nominated

== GAFFA Awards ==
=== Denmark GAFFA Awards ===
Delivered since 1991, the GAFFA Awards are a Danish award that rewards popular music by the magazine of the same name.

Year	Nominee / work	Award	Result	Ref.
2006	Unplugged in New York	Best Foreign Music-DVD	Won	
2009	Live at Reading	Best Foreign Music-DVD	Won	

== Grammy Awards ==
The Grammy Awards are awarded annually by the National Academy of Recording Arts and Sciences of the United States. Nirvana has received 1 award from a total of seven nominations. In 2023, Nirvana were awarded a Lifetime Achievement Award at the 2023 Grammy Awards. Notably, Pat Smear was honored at the event (alongside Novoselic and Grohl), despite his brief tenure in the band. Each member received their own trophy at the ceremony.

Year	Nominee / work	Award	Result
1992	Nevermind	Best Alternative Music Performance	Nominated
1993	"Smells Like Teen Spirit"	Best Hard Rock Performance	Nominated
1993	"Smells Like Teen Spirit"	Best Rock Song	Nominated
1994	In Utero	Best Alternative Music Performance	Nominated
1995	"All Apologies"	Best Rock Performance by a Duo or Group with Vocal	Nominated
1995	"All Apologies"	Best Rock Song	Nominated
1996	MTV Unplugged in New York	Best Alternative Music Performance	Won
2023	—	Grammy Lifetime Achievement Award	Honored

== Juno Awards ==
The Juno Awards are presented annually to Canadian musical artists and bands to acknowledge their artistic and technical achievements in all aspects of music. New members of the Canadian Music Hall of Fame are also inducted as part of the awards ceremonies.

Year	Nominee / work	Award	Result
1993	Nevermind	Best Selling Album (Foreign or Domestic)	Nominated

== MOJO Awards ==
MOJO Awards are awarded by the popular British music magazine, Mojo, published monthly by Bauer.

Year	Nominee / work	Award	Result
2007	Live! Tonight! Sold Out!!	Vision Award	Nominated

== MTV Video Music Awards ==
The MTV Video Music Awards is an annual awards ceremony established in 1984 by MTV. Nirvana has received five awards from ten nominations.

Year	Nominee / work	Award	Result
1992	"Smells Like Teen Spirit"	Video of the Year	Nominated
1992	"Smells Like Teen Spirit"	Best New Artist in a Video	Won
1992	"Smells Like Teen Spirit"	Best Alternative Video	Won
1992	"Smells Like Teen Spirit"	Viewer's Choice	Nominated
1993	"In Bloom"	Best Alternative Video	Won
1994	"Heart-Shaped Box"	Video of the Year	Nominated
1994	"Heart-Shaped Box"	Best Alternative Video	Won
1994	"Heart-Shaped Box"	Best Art Direction in a Video	Won
1994	"Heart-Shaped Box"	Best Cinematography in a Video	Nominated
1994	"Heart-Shaped Box"	Viewer's Choice	Nominated
2026	—	Michael Jackson Video Vanguard Award	Honored

== NME Awards ==
Founded by the British music magazine NME, the NME Awards are awarded annually. Nirvana has won four awards from nine nominations.

Year	Nominee / work	Award	Result
1991	"Smells Like Teen Spirit"	Best Single	Won
1995	Kurt Cobain's Suicide	Bummer of the Year	Won
2000	"Smells Like Teen Spirit"	Best Single Ever	Won
2003	"You Know You're Right"	Best Video	Nominated
2005	With The Lights Out	Best Music DVD	Nominated
2008	Unplugged in New York	Best Music DVD	Won
2010	Live at Reading	Best Music DVD	Nominated
2012	Nevermind	Best Reissue	Nominated
2014	In Utero	Best Reissue	Nominated

== O Music Awards ==
The O Music Awards is an awards show presented by Viacom to honor music, technology and intersection between the two. The 1st O Music Awards ceremony was held on April 28, 2011 on Fremont Street in Downtown Las Vegas.

Year	Nominee / work	Award	Result
2011	"Smells Like Teen Spirit"	Best Vintage Viral Video	Won

== Pollstar Concert Industry Awards ==
The Pollstar Concert Industry Awards aim to reward the best in the business of shows and concerts.

Year	Nominee / work	Award	Result
1991	Themselves	Best New Rock Artist	Won
1991	Nevermind Tour	Club Tour of the Year	Nominated

== Rock and Roll Hall of Fame ==
The Rock and Roll Hall of Fame is a museum located on the shores of Lake Erie in downtown Cleveland, Ohio, United States, dedicated to recording the history of some of the best-known and most influential artists, producers, and other people who have in some major way influenced the music industry.

Nirvana was inducted into the Rock and Roll Hall of Fame on April 10, 2014.

Year	Nominated Work	Category	Result	Ref.
2014	Nirvana	Rock and Roll Hall of Fame	Inducted	
