= Been a Son =

1989 song by Nirvana

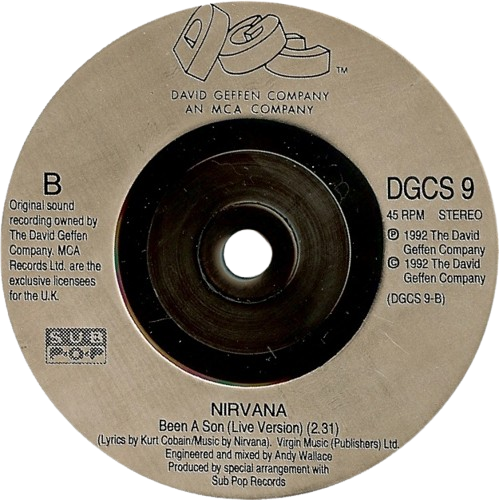
- Live version B-side label from the UK single, released in 1992 with "Lithium" as the A-side

Song by Nirvana

from the EP Blew and the album Incesticide
- Released: November 1989 (Blew); December 1992 (Incesticide)
- Recorded: September 1989 (Blew); November 1991 (Incesticide)
- Studio: Music Source, Seattle, US (Blew); Maida Vale Studio 4, London, UK (Incesticide)
- Genre: Grunge; pop-punk; indie pop
- Length: 2:22 (Blew); 1:55 (Incesticide)
- Label: Sub Pop (Blew); DGC (Incesticide)
- Songwriter: Kurt Cobain
- Producers: Steve Fisk (Blew); Mark Goodier (Incesticide)

"Been a Son" is a song by the American rock band Nirvana, written by vocalist and guitarist Kurt Cobain. It was originally released on the Blew EP in November 1989, which charted at number 15 on the UK Indie Singles chart.

A second studio version appears on the rarities compilation album Incesticide, released in December 1992.

== History ==
Written in 1989, the earliest known version of "Been a Son" is a solo home demo, featuring Cobain on vocals, guitar and bass guitar. A clip of it first appeared in the 2015 Cobain documentary, Montage of Heck, directed by Brett Morgen, and the full version was subsequently released on the film's soundtrack in November 2015.

=== Blew EP ===
"Been a Son" was first recorded in the studio in September 1989 by Steve Fisk at Music Source in Seattle, Washington. Of the five songs recorded, only two were officially released, with both "Been a Son" and "Stain" appearing on the Blew EP in December 1989. The session was Nirvana's first time recording on two inch, 24 track tape, and Fisk recalls that "when it was all over with, we played 'Been a Son' really loud on the big stupid speakers three times and stood up on the client tables in the back room and danced."

Cobain would later dismiss this version of the song as "slower [and] lamer" than the version later released on Incesticide. However, this is the version of the song that appeared on the band's 2002 greatest hits album, Nirvana, which marked its first release since its appearance on Blew. American filmmaker, author and radio DJ Kurt St. Thomas has called it the definitive take, saying it better displayed Nirvana's signature thrashing guitar sound and because of the more prominent bass guitar solo in the mix.

=== Post-Blew ===
"Been a Son" was first performed live on October 8, 1989 at the Lif Ticket Lounge in Omaha, Nebraska, the show at which Nirvana also debuted the future Nevermind song, "Breed", which was then called "Immodium".

On September 25, 1990, Cobain performed a solo acoustic version of the song on the Boy Meets Girl show, hosted by Beat Happening vocalist and guitarist Calvin Johnson, on KAOS (FM) in Olympia, Washington. This version of the song was released on the posthumous Nirvana box set, With the Lights Out, in November 2004.

In July 1992, a live version of the song, recorded at the Paramount Theatre in Seattle, Washington on October 31, 1991, was released as a b-side on the third single from Nevermind, for the song, "Lithium."

=== Incesticide and final performances ===
A second studio version of "Been a Son" was recorded for the BBC program The Evening Session at Maida Vale Studios in London, England on November 9, 1991. It was released on the rarities compilation, Incesticide, in December 1992. Produced by Miti Adhikari, the session also yielded the versions of "Polly" and "Aneurysm" that appeared on the album.

The final live performance of "Been a Son" was at the band's Bosnian Rape Victim Benefit show at the Cow Palace in Daly City, California, on April 9, 1993. The song was considered for the band's MTV Unplugged appearance in November 1993, but is not confirmed to have been rehearsed, and was not performed at the show.

== Lyrics and composition ==
=== Music ===
Reviewing Nirvana's 2002 greatest hits compilation, Will Bryant of Pitchfork wrote that the song "sounds like a test run for Nevermind, all rigid harmonies and tight, churning guitar."

=== Lyrics ===
"Been a Son" represents one of Cobain's earliest commentaries on the issues of sex and gender. In his 1993 biography Come As You Are: The Story of Nirvana, Michael Azerrad described "the instantly catchy" song as being about "the plight of a girl whose parents would have preferred a boy." Pitchfork's Jenn Pelly described it as "a comment on how patriarchy sees women as second-class citizens, on how it dictates what it thinks women should be."

== Release and reception ==
"Been a Son" has been cited as one of the earliest examples of Nirvana's more melodic direction following the release of their 1989 debut album, Bleach. As author Chuck Crisafulli noted, Cobain suppressed his pop influences during the band's earliest years, but after the release of Bleach, he became more outspoken and confident about professing his love of John Lennon and the Beatles during interviews. Fisk, who produced the first version of the song, said that the recording featured "Total Lennon harmonies, right out of Rubber Soul". Azerrad wrote that Cobain's vocals were "draped in most un-Sub Pop-like harmonies", a reference to Nirvana's then-record label, best known for their heavier grunge sound that defined most of Bleach, with the exception of "About a Girl". English musician Tim Arnold described the song as part of Nirvana's post-Bleach "political thrust to the top of the charts."

In his review of Incesticide for AllMusic, Stephen Thomas Erlewine cited "the terrific forgotten indie pop tune 'Been a Son'" as one of the compilation's highlights.

In 2015, Rolling Stone named "Been a Son" the 23rd best Nirvana song in their "No Apologies: All 102 Nirvana Songs Ranked" list. In 2019, The Guardian ranked it at number 11 on their list of "Nirvana's 20 greatest songs". The A.V. Club ranked it at number 14 on their list of Nirvana's "30 greatest songs" in 2023.

== Certifications ==
Region	Certification	Certified units/sales
Denmark (IFPI Danmark)	Platinum	90,000^{‡}
^{‡} Sales+streaming figures based on certification alone.

== Accolades ==
Year	Publication	Country	Accolade	Rank
2019	The Guardian	United Kingdom	Nirvana's 20 greatest songs - ranked!	11
2023	The A.V. Club	United States	Essential Nirvana: Their 30 greatest songs, ranked	14

== Other releases ==
- A live version, recorded at the Pine Street Theatre in Portland, Oregon on February 9, 1990, appeared on the 20th anniversary "Deluxe" edition of Bleach, which was released in November 2009 and featured the full Pine Street show as bonus material.
- The full Paramount show, including "Been a Son," was released on DVD and Blu-Ray in November 2009 as Live at the Paramount.
- A live version, recorded at the Paradiso in Amsterdam, the Netherlands on November 25, 1991, appeared on the live compilation From the Muddy Banks of the Wishkah in November 1996. Footage of this version was released on the bonus disc of the live video Live! Tonight! Sold Out!! in November 2006, when it was first released on DVD. The full Paradiso show was released on CD and Blu-Ray in November 2021 on the 30th anniversary "Super Deluxe" version of Nevermind.
- The 30th anniversary "Super Deluxe" release of Nevermind also included the band's full show at the Nakano Sunplaza in Tokyo, Japan on February 19, 1992, which featured a version of "Been a Son."
- A live version, from the band's headlining set at the 1992 Reading Festival in Reading, England on August 30, 1992, appeared on the CD and DVD release Live at Reading in November 2009.

== Cover versions ==
Year	Artist	Album
2003	Manic Street Preachers	Lipstick Traces (A Secret History of Manic Street Preachers) 1999 Radio session
2022	Softcult	Been a Son (non-album single)
