= Hormoaning =

- Australian cover

EP by Nirvana
- Released: January 27, 1992
- Recorded: October 21, 1990; January 1, 1991
- Studios: Maida Vale (London, United Kingdom); Music Source (Seattle, Washington)
- Genres: Grunge; punk rock; alternative rock
- Length: 18:51
- Labels: DGC, Geffen
- Producers: Dale Griffin, Craig Montgomery

Nirvana chronology
Nevermind, It's an Interview (1992)	Hormoaning (1992)	Incesticide (1992)

Japanese cover

Hormoaning is an extended play (EP) by the American rock band Nirvana. It was released in Australia on January 27, 1992, and in Japan on February 5, 1992, through DGC Records and Geffen Records. It was released in Australia and Japan only, during the band's tour there.

== Songs ==
Four of the songs on Hormoaning are covers which had not been released previously. The remaining two songs are Nirvana originals which previously appeared as B-sides to singles for Nevermind.

"Aneurysm" and "Even in His Youth", two Nirvana originals produced and engineered by Craig Montgomery, also appear as B-sides on the "Smells Like Teen Spirit" single. This version of "Aneurysm" later appeared on disc two of the rarities box set With the Lights Out in 2004 and is different from the alternate version released on Incesticide in 1992.

The other four songs are from a Peel Session, recorded for BBC Radio on October 21, 1990. "Turnaround" (originally by Devo), "Son of a Gun" and "Molly's Lips" (originally by The Vaselines) appear on the Incesticide album. "D-7" is a cover of the Wipers song and appears on the UK version of the "Lithium" single and later on disc 2 of With the Lights Out in 2004.

== Release and reception ==
Professional ratings
Review scores
Source	Rating
AllMusic	4/5 stars
Tom Hull – on the Web	B+
The Village Voice	A−

In Australia, 15,000 official copies were released: 4,000 on burgundy 12-inch vinyl, 10,000 on CD, and 1,000 on cassette. There were two different pressings of the Australian CD, one with a silver CD and one with a blue CD. In Japan it was released on CD in large quantities. The Australian and Japanese releases have entirely different artwork. The Australian version is considered rare due to the limited numbers. There were only two official Japanese pressings, both on CD with barely noticeable variations in artwork. The Japanese CDs were rushed out without prior consent from the US parent company, and as a result, the cover art is taken from the inside artwork of the Nevermind album. All Japanese vinyl copies were counterfeit. Counterfeit versions of the Japanese CDs also exist, and the Australian blue CD version has also been counterfeited. The Australian silver CD is the only official version of which counterfeit copies are not known to exist.

In a contemporary review for The Village Voice, Robert Christgau gave Hormoaning an "A−" and found it almost as good as their second album, Nevermind (1991), and far superior to their first record, Bleach (1989), particularly because "without David Grohl they're sludge monkeys". He named it the 33rd best album of 1992 in his list for the Pazz & Jop, an annual poll of American critics published by The Village Voice. In a retrospective review, AllMusic's Steve Bekkala gave the EP four out of five stars and called it "a revealing entry in the catalog of the most influential rock band of the '90s".

Hormoaning was officially re-released on Record Store Day (April 16, 2011) as a 12-inch vinyl. Only 6,000 unnumbered copies were released.

== Track listing ==
No.	Title	Writer(s)	Length
1.	"Turnaround" (Devo cover)	Gerald Casale; Mark Mothersbaugh	2:21
2.	"Aneurysm"	Kurt Cobain; Dave Grohl; Krist Novoselic	4:49
3.	"D-7" (Wipers cover)	Greg Sage	3:47
4.	"Son of a Gun" (The Vaselines cover)	Eugene Kelly; Frances McKee	2:50
5.	"Even in His Youth"	Cobain; Novoselic	3:07
6.	"Molly's Lips" (The Vaselines cover)	Kelly; McKee	1:53
Total length:			18:51

== Personnel ==
Nirvana

- Kurt Cobain – guitar, vocals
- Krist Novoselic – bass guitar
- Dave Grohl – drums

Production

- Mike Engles – engineering on "Turnaround", "D-7", "Son of a Gun", and "Molly's Lips"
- Dale Griffin – production on "Turnaround", "D-7", "Son of a Gun", and "Molly's Lips"
- Fred Kay – engineer on "Turnaround", "D-7", "Son of a Gun", and "Molly's Lips"
- Craig Montgomery – production, engineer on "Aneurysm" and "Even in His Youth"
- Andy Wallace – mixing on "Aneurysm" and "Even in His Youth"

== Charts ==
=== 1992 original release ===
Chart (1992)	Peak position
Australian Albums (ARIA)	2
Australian Alternative Albums (ARIA)	1
Japanese Albums (Oricon)	67

=== 2011 Record Store Day re-release ===
Chart (2011)	Peak position
US Tastemaker Albums (Billboard)	20

=== Year-end charts ===
1992 year-end chart performance for Hormoaning
Chart (1992)	Position
Australian Alternative Albums (ARIA)	5

== Release history ==
The following table shows the release history of official releases of Hormoaning.

Year	Country	Type	Number of copies produced	Record label
1992	Australia	CD (blue)	5,000	Geffen Records
1992	Australia	CD (silver)	5,000	Geffen Records
1992	Australia	Cassette	1,000	Geffen Records
1992	Australia	Vinyl (burgundy)	4,000	Geffen Records
1992	Japan	CD (two versions)	Unknown	Geffen Records (Japan)
2011	United States	Vinyl (black)	6,000	Universal Music Group

== See also ==
- Whores Moaning (in reference to the EP’s name)
