= Craig Montgomery (sound engineer) =

Audio engineer

Craig Montgomery is an audio engineer from Seattle. He began working with Nirvana shortly after their debut album Bleach was released in 1989 on indie record label Sub Pop. Montgomery also worked with other bands on the Sub Pop label.

Montgomery worked at every Nirvana show for several years. He's said that it started off as "four of us in Krist's Dodge van going to punk rock clubs across the country". He first met Nirvana drummer Dave Grohl in 1990, during a week long tour in the United Kingdom where Nirvana played with L7. According to SPIN Magazine he continued working with Nirvana until the In Utero tour.

Montgomery was scheduled to work with Hole in Spring 1994 but that tour was cancelled after Nirvana frontman Kurt Cobain committed suicide.
