= Candy / Molly's Lips =

1991 split single by The Fluid / Nirvana

"Candy/Molly's Lips"

Single by the Fluid and Nirvana
- Released: January 1991
- Recorded: "Molly's Lips": February 9, 1990 "Candy": 1990
- Genre: Alternative rock; pop-punk; grunge
- Length: 5:15
- Label: Sub Pop

Nirvana singles chronology
"Sliver" (1990)	"Candy" / "Molly's Lips" (1991)	"Here She Comes Now/Venus in Furs" (1991)

"Candy"/"Molly's Lips" is a vinyl-only split-single from the American rock bands the Fluid and Nirvana. It was released in January 1991 on Sub Pop Records and includes two live tracks: "Candy" by the Fluid; and "Molly's Lips", a cover of a song by the Vaselines, performed by Nirvana.

== Background ==
"Candy" first appeared on the Fluid's 1990 EP, Glue. The EP was re-released on CD in 1993 along with their 1989 album, Roadmouth.

"Molly's Lips" was recorded live on February 9, 1990, at the Pine Street Theatre in Portland, Oregon. It was written by Scottish band the Vaselines about Molly Weir, according to band member Eugene Kelly, presumably because her Rentaghost television character Hazel McWitch typically appeared in whiteface with emphatic red lips, and described by Kelly as what he "would like to do up a dark alley with her one night." According to Michael Azerrad's 1993 Nirvana biography Come as You Are: The Story of Nirvana, the band's frontman Kurt Cobain was opposed to the release of the track, feeling that this version was not strong. However, the single constituted part of the band's buyout deal from their former record label Sub Pop; "Candy/Molly's Lips" was Nirvana's final release there. The word "Later" is etched into the single's run-out groove. A remix of this version of "Molly's Lips" was included on the 2009 reissue of the Nirvana debut album Bleach.

Nirvana also recorded a studio version of "Molly's Lips" on BBC Radio 1 for John Peel in October 1990 during drummer Dave Grohl's first recording session with the band. It appeared on the 1992 tour EP Hormoaning and was included on the rarities compilation Incesticide. This version was released as a 12" vinyl promotional single in Brazil, to promote Incesticide.

== "Molly's Lips" composition ==
"Molly's Lips" is an uptempo alternative rock song that lasts for two minutes and nineteen seconds. According to the sheet music published at Musicnotes.com by Universal Music Publishing Group, it is written in common time, with a fast tempo of 160 beats per minute. "Molly's Lips" is composed in G major, while Kurt Cobain's vocal range spans from the low-note of F_{3} to the high-note of E_{4}. The song follows a basic sequence that alternates between the power chords of G_{5} and C_{5} throughout the whole song as its chord progression.

== Release and promotion ==
The single was only released on 7 inch vinyl, and in limited numbers of 7500. The first 4000 copies were pressed on green swirled vinyl, the final 3500 pressed on black vinyl. Counterfeit versions of the single also pressed on black vinyl exist, but can be distinguished from the real version as the matrix number is different. The live version of "Molly's Lips" by Nirvana was exclusive to the single, though was subsequently released on the 2009 Bleach reissue. The single later became the Fluid's most famous release, as their appearance with Nirvana exposed them to a wider audience.

In 2017, to mark what would have been Kurt Cobain's 50th birthday, the Phonographic Performance Limited released a list of the top twenty most played Nirvana songs on the TV and radio in the UK in which "Molly's Lips" was ranked at number eighteen.

== Charts ==
Chart (1991)	Peak position
US Progressive Retail (CMJ)	64

== Accolades ==
Year	Publication	Country	Accolade	Rank
2019	The Guardian	United Kingdom	Dave Grohl's Landmark Songs	N/A

== Live performances ==
Apart from this 1990 live version, released on limited edition single in 1991, Nirvana performed "Molly's Lips" several other times in concert from 1989 to 1993. On August 23, 1991, it was performed live with its author, the Vaselines' Eugene Kelly, at the 1991 Reading Festival in Reading, Berkshire. It was again performed live with Kelly on December 5, 1991 in London, England. On both occasions, Kelly and Cobain shared vocal duties.

== Track listing ==
1. "Candy (Live)" by the Fluid – 3:15
2. "Molly's Lips (Live)" by Nirvana – 2:00

== Recording and release history ==
=== Studio versions ===
Date recorded	Studio	Producer	Releases	Personnel
October 21, 1990	Maida Vale Studios, London, UK	John Peel	Hormoaning (1992); Incesticide (1992) "Molly's Lips" (promo single released only in Brazil) (1992)	Kurt Cobain: vocals, guitar; Krist Novoselic: bass guitar; Dave Grohl: drums

=== Live versions ===
Date recorded	Venue	Releases	Personnel
February 9, 1990	Pine Street Theater, Portland, Oregon, US	"Candy" / 'Molly's Lips" (1991); Bleach (deluxe) (2009)	Kurt Cobain: vocals, guitar; Krist Novoselic: bass guitar; Chad Channing: drums
