= Incesticide =

Compilation album by Nirvana
- Released: December 14, 1992
- Recorded: January 23, 1988 – November 9, 1991
- Genres: Grunge; alternative rock; punk rock; sludge metal
- Length: 44:41
- Label: DGC
- Producers: Miti Adhikari; Dale Griffin; Jack Endino; Steve Fisk; Butch Vig

Nirvana chronology
Hormoaning (1992)	Incesticide (1992)	In Utero (1993)

Incesticide is the first compilation album by the American rock band Nirvana. It consists of their 1990 non-album single "Sliver", including its B-side "Dive", along with demos, outtakes, and recordings from BBC Radio sessions. It was released on December 14, 1992, in Europe, and December 15, 1992, in the United States, between the band's breakthrough album Nevermind and their third album In Utero. The album reached number 39 on the Billboard 200.

== Background ==
Early in 1992, Jonathan Poneman of Sub Pop contacted Gary Gersh, who had previously signed Nirvana to DGC Records, to inform him that Sub Pop still had a number of unreleased early Nirvana recordings in its possession. The band had intended to release the material via Sub Pop and cynically called it Cash Cow. However, Sub Pop could not match Geffen Records' distribution network, and the band felt that getting the material maximum exposure was important. Sub Pop sold the recordings to Geffen for "a six-figure amount" on the condition that the band would create and approve the release of an album by Christmas 1992.

At the time, the majority of the material on Incesticide was circulating within fan communities (albeit in lower quality). It was widely reported in the music press that the band wanted to offer fans a higher-quality alternative. In the book Cobain Unseen, Charles R. Cross writes that Kurt Cobain agreed to the release of this compilation because he was allowed complete control over the album's artwork.

Since the songs were recorded in different sessions and some were recorded when Nirvana did not have a stable formation, the album includes recordings by four different drummers: Chad Channing, Dan Peters, Dale Crover, and Dave Grohl.

In March 1993, more than two years after the release of "Sliver", a music video for the song was filmed to promote Incesticide. It was directed by Kevin Kerslake and features the band performing in Kurt Cobain's garage, decorated with his personal memorabilia. Cobain's infant daughter Frances Bean Cobain also makes an appearance.

== Songs ==
=== Previously unreleased ===
- A different version of "Been a Son" was originally released in 1989 on the Blew EP. The version on Incesticide was recorded in 1991 during a BBC Radio studio session.
- "(New Wave) Polly" is a hard rock version of the Nevermind album track "Polly", recorded in 1991 during a BBC Radio studio session.
- A different version of "Aneurysm" was originally released as a B-side on the "Smells Like Teen Spirit" single. The version on Incesticide was recorded two months later during a BBC Radio studio session.

=== Previously released ===
- "Dive" and "Sliver" were released on the "Sliver" single in 1990. "Dive" also appeared on the 1991 compilation album The Grunge Years.
- "Stain" was originally released on the Blew EP in 1989.
- Three cover songs, "Turnaround" (by Devo), "Molly's Lips", and "Son of a Gun" (both by The Vaselines), were released on the Hormoaning EP in 1992, which was released only in Australia and Japan.
- "Mexican Seafood" appeared on the 1989 compilation Teriyaki Asthma Volume 1.
- "Beeswax" appeared on the 1991 compilation Kill Rock Stars.
- "Downer" was included as a bonus track on the 1990 CD release of Nirvana's 1989 debut album Bleach.

Although not commercially released at the time, "Beeswax", "Downer", "Mexican Seafood", "Hairspray Queen", and "Aero Zeppelin" were first circulated on Nirvana Demo / Montage of Heck, Nirvana's first demo tape, in 1988.

== Artwork and packaging ==
The cover art was painted by Cobain, who is credited as "Kurdt Kobain" in the liner notes. The plastic duck seen on the album's back cover belonged to art director Robert Fisher. It can also be seen on the front sleeve of the compilation album DGC Rarities.

The first several pressings of the album contained liner notes written by Cobain, including a statement decrying homophobia, racism and misogyny:

If any of you in any way hate homosexuals, people of different color, or women, please do this one favor for us—leave us the fuck alone! Don't come to our shows and don't buy our records.

Versions of the album containing the liner notes by Cobain could be found at record stores as late as 1998. Initial copies in the U.S. and Canada also contained a Parental Advisory label.

== Critical reception ==
Professional ratings
Review scores
Source	Rating
AllMusic	4.5/5 stars
Blender	3/5 stars
The Encyclopedia of Popular Music	3/5 stars
Entertainment Weekly	B
NME	7/10 / 3/10
Pitchfork	8.7/10
Rolling Stone	3/5 stars
The Rolling Stone Album Guide	3/5 stars
Select	3/5 medals
The Village Voice	A−

The album received generally positive reviews. "Nobody really wants a Hatful of Hollow–type assortment of Peel/Goodier sessions, B-sides, demos and obscurities in the place of a proper studio album", observed Andrew Perry in Select. "But, hell, wouldn't you try and put an end to the consumer madness going on in your name? And harvest some of the money for yourself? Anyway, people might start talking about the music again…" In a review for AllMusic, music critic Stephen Thomas Erlewine said that the song "Aneurysm" was "perhaps the greatest single song the group ever recorded".

== Commercial performance ==
Incesticide was released on December 14, 1992, in the United Kingdom, and on December 15, 1992, in the United States. The record label, Geffen, decided against heavily promoting the album, possibly to avoid a "Nirvana burnout" as the band had released Nevermind and four singles in the preceding fifteen months.

Despite this lack of promotion and being a collection of old and new material, Incesticide debuted at number 51 in the Billboard 200 and sold 500,000 copies in two months. The album is certified Platinum by the Recording Industry Association of America. In the United Kingdom, the album debuted at number 17, and peaked at number 14.

On November 23, 2012, Incesticide was re-released on vinyl as a limited two-LP 45 RPM edition for its 20th anniversary.

== Track listing ==
Incesticide track listing
No.	Title	Writer(s)	Original release	Length
1.	"Dive"	Kurt Cobain, Krist Novoselic	B-side to "Sliver", 1990	3:55
2.	"Sliver"	Cobain, Novoselic	non-album single	2:16
3.	"Stain"	Cobain, Novoselic	Blew, 1989	2:40
4.	"Been a Son"	Cobain, Novoselic	Previously unreleased alternate version	1:55
5.	"Turnaround"	Mark Mothersbaugh, Gerald Casale	Hormoaning, 1992	2:19
6.	"Molly's Lips"	Eugene Kelly, Frances McKee	Hormoaning	1:54
7.	"Son of a Gun"	Kelly, McKee	Hormoaning	2:48
8.	"(New Wave) Polly"	Cobain, Novoselic, Dave Grohl	Previously unreleased alternate version	1:47
9.	"Beeswax"	Cobain	Kill Rock Stars, 1991	2:50
10.	"Downer"	Cobain, Novoselic	CD version of Bleach, 1990	1:44
11.	"Mexican Seafood"	Cobain	Teriyaki Asthma Volume 1, 1989	1:55
12.	"Hairspray Queen"	Cobain	Previously unreleased	4:13
13.	"Aero Zeppelin"	Cobain, Novoselic	Previously unreleased	4:41
14.	"Big Long Now"	Cobain, Novoselic	Previously unreleased	5:03
15.	"Aneurysm"	Cobain, Novoselic, Grohl	Previously unreleased alternate version	4:35
Total length:				44:41

== Personnel ==
All sessions:

- Kurt Cobain – vocals, guitar
- Krist Novoselic – bass guitar

Seattle, WA: Reciprocal Recording Studios (January 23, 1988)
Nirvana's first studio demo tape.
Songs: "Beeswax", "Downer", "Mexican Seafood", "Hairspray Queen", and "Aero Zeppelin"

- Dale Crover – drums
- Jack Endino – producer, engineer

Seattle, WA: Reciprocal Recording Studios (December 1988 – January 1989)
The Bleach recording sessions.
Song: "Big Long Now"

- Chad Channing – drums
- Jack Endino – producer, engineer

Seattle, WA: Music Source Studios (September 1989)
The Blew EP recording sessions.
Song: "Stain"

- Chad Channing – drums
- Steve Fisk – producer

Madison, WI: Smart Studios (April 2, 1990 – April 6, 1990)
The sessions for the planned second Sub Pop album.
Song: "Dive"

- Chad Channing – drums
- Butch Vig – producer

Seattle, WA: Reciprocal Recording Studios (July 11, 1990)
The "Sliver" Sub Pop single session.
Song: "Sliver"

- Dan Peters – drums
- Jack Endino – producer, engineer

London, England: Maida Vale Studio 3 (October 21, 1990)
The 1990 BBC session for John Peel.
Songs: "Turnaround", "Molly's Lips", and "Son of a Gun"

- Dave Grohl – drums
- Dale Griffin – producer
- Mike Engles – engineer
- Fred Kay – engineer

London, England: Maida Vale Studio 4 (November 9, 1991)
The 1991 BBC session for Mark Goodier.
Songs: "Been a Son", "(New Wave) Polly", and "Aneurysm"

- Dave Grohl – drums
- Miti Adhikari – producer
- John Taylor – engineer

== Charts ==
Chart (1992–93)	Peak position
Australian Albums (ARIA)	22
Australian Alternative Albums (ARIA)	1
Austrian Albums (Ö3 Austria)	10
Canada Top Albums/CDs (RPM)	21
Canada Top Retail Albums (The Record)	17
European Top 100 Albums (Music & Media)	17
Dutch Albums (Album Top 100)	31
Finnish Albums (The Official Finnish Charts)	16
French Albums (SNEP)	28
German Albums (Offizielle Top 100)	40
Greek Albums (Pop & Rock)	14
Japanese Albums (Oricon)	50
New Zealand Albums (RMNZ)	23
Swedish Albums (Sverigetopplistan)	27
Swiss Albums (Schweizer Hitparade)	18
UK Albums (Official Charts)	14
UK Rock & Metal Albums (CIN)	1
US Billboard 200	39
US Top 200 Pop Albums (Cashbox)	35
US Progressive Retail (CMJ)	1

Chart (1994)	Peak position
Scottish Albums (Official Charts)	63

Chart (1995)	Peak position
US Top Catalog Albums (Billboard)	43

Chart (2000)	Peak position
UK Rock & Metal Albums (Official Charts)	7

Chart (2021)	Peak position
Greek Albums (IFPI)	6

Chart (2022)	Peak position
Greek Albums (Billboard)	5

Chart (2024)	Peak position
Belgian Albums (Ultratop Flanders)	138

== Certifications ==
Region	Certification	Certified units/sales
Australia (ARIA)	Gold	35,000^{‡}
Canada (Music Canada)	2× Platinum	200,000^{^}
France (SNEP)	Gold	100,000^{*}
United Kingdom (BPI)	Platinum	300,000^{*}
United States (RIAA)	Platinum	1,400,000
^{*} Sales figures based on certification alone.^{^} Shipments figures based on certification alone.^{‡} Sales+streaming figures based on certification alone.
