= La Luna (Portland, Oregon) =

Former music venue in Portland, Oregon, U.S.

Coordinates: 45°31′16.36″N 122°39′25.11″W

- Interactive map of La Luna
- Address: 215 SE 9th Ave; Portland, Oregon

Construction
- Opened: 1992

La Luna (or LaLuna) was a rock-'n'-roll nightclub in Portland, Oregon, United States from 1992 to 1999. Willamette Week described it as such: "For most of the 1990s, this inner-Southeast club was the center of gravity for the Portland music scene."

During its years of operation, La Luna featured bands and performers including: Elliott Smith, Radiohead, PJ Harvey, Green Day, The Smashing Pumpkins, The Dandy Warhols, Hole, and Nine Inch Nails.

Located at the corner of Southeast Ninth Avenue and Southeast Pine Street, La Luna's main performance space could accommodate around 1,000 spectators. It was previously known as the Ninth Street Exit (in the 1970s) and the Pine Street Theater (1980–1991). It was called RKCNDY Portland (Rock Candy) for most of 1992. It later returned to its second name, the Pine Street Theater (2000–02), before being redubbed Solid State (2004–05) during its final years of operation.

The balcony served as a smaller performance space for more intimate shows and featured musicians like Smith. An eatery named the La Luna Cafe opened in 2020 and is currently located in the same building.

== See also ==
- Culture of Portland, Oregon
- Music of Oregon
