= Love Buzz =

1969 song by Shocking Blue

Song by Shocking Blue

from the album At Home
- Released: 30 September 1969
- Recorded: 1969
- Studio: Sound Push Studios, Blaricum, Netherlands
- Length: 3:40
- Label: Pink Elephant
- Songwriter: Robbie van Leeuwen

"Love Buzz" is a song by Dutch rock band Shocking Blue. It was written by Robbie van Leeuwen and first released on the group's 1969 album At Home. The original song is notable for its psychedelic rock style and its extensive use of the sitar, played by Leeuwen.

The intro sample on the original single comes from the LP Monster Shindig featuring Snooper and Blabber Hanna-Barbera productions 1965.

== Nirvana version ==
"Love Buzz"
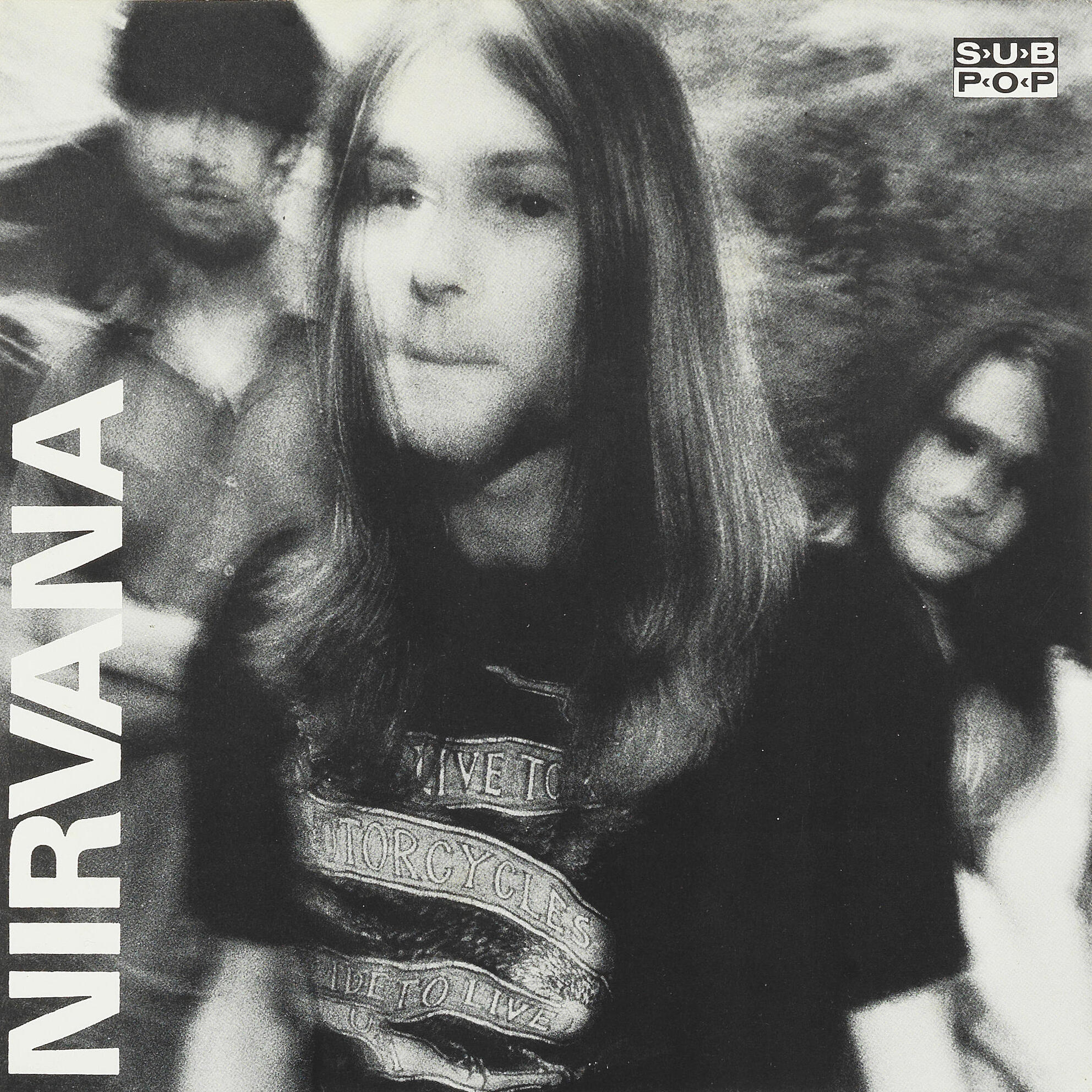
- Front album picture

Single by Nirvana

from the album Bleach
- B-side: "Big Cheese"
- Released: November 1988
- Recorded: June 30, 1988 and July 16, 1988
- Studio: Reciprocal Recordings, Seattle, Washington
- Genre: Grunge; alternative rock; punk rock; noise pop
- Length: 3:35; 3:45 (with intro)
- Label: Sub Pop
- Songwriter: Robbie van Leeuwen
- Producer: Jack Endino

Nirvana singles chronology
| "Love Buzz" (1988) | "Blew" (1989) |

Audio sample
- file; help

American rock band Nirvana recorded a cover version of the song as their debut single, released on Sub Pop in 1988. It was described by Sub Pop as being "heavy pop sludge." The version recorded by Sub Pop was chosen for the feature soundtrack on 1990 skateboarding video Board Crazy.

=== Release and reception ===
It was the first single in the Sub Pop Singles Club and was limited to 1,000 numbered copies. A Sub Pop invoice indicates that 1200 sleeves were made, the other 200 having a red slash instead of a number. Due to their rarity and Nirvana's later fame, original copies of the EP are typically valued at several thousand dollars.

It was made single of the week in Sounds by John Robb, which was the first mention of the band in the UK press.

The single was reviewed in the 2 December 1988 issue of CMJ, in which it stated "Nowhere else are you gonna hear such a teeth-rattling Seattle sludgemeister demolition job. Nirvana mixes things up good and choppy, including all the ingredients for primal rock greatness".

In a 1989 review for British music magazine Melody Maker, Everett True wrote, "Nirvana are beauty incarnate. A relentless two-chord garage beat which lays down some serious foundations for a sheer monster of a guitar to howl over. The volume control ain't been built yet which can do justice to this three-piece!" True also made "Love Buzz" joint-US Single of the Week. True also described Nirvana's "Love Buzz" single as a "Limited edition of 1,000; love songs for the psychotically disturbed".

A slightly different mix of the song would also appear on Nirvana's debut album, Bleach. This version is missing a 10-second sound collage introduction put together by Kurt Cobain. "Love Buzz" was later released on Nirvana's Blew EP in the UK in December 1989. This was the song's first release in the UK after being substituted by "Big Cheese" on the British release of Bleach.

=== Track listing ===
| No. | Title | Writer(s) | Length |
|---|---|---|---|
| 1. | "Love Buzz" | Robbie van Leeuwen | 3:45 |
| 2. | "Big Cheese" | Kurt Cobain | 3:42 |
| Total length: | | | 7:27 |

=== Live versions ===
A live performance in Olympia, Washington from 1990, which was drummer Dave Grohl's first live concert with Nirvana, was released on the DVD of the Nirvana rarities boxset With the Lights Out in 2004.

A live performance from October 19, 1991, at Trees in Dallas, Texas, can be seen on Nirvana's 1994 home video Live! Tonight! Sold Out!! in which frontman Kurt Cobain got into a fight with a bouncer. On Live! Tonight! Sold Out!!, after the fight is stopped, the second half of the song is shown from a concert which took place on November 25, 1991, at the Paradiso, Amsterdam, Netherlands.

A live performance from October 31, 1991 at the Paramount Theatre, Seattle, Washington, was released on the Live at the Paramount DVD and Blu-ray, and on the 20th anniversary "Super Deluxe" box set of the Nevermind album in 2011.

Three live performances were released on the 30th anniversary "Super Deluxe" box set of the Nevermind album in 2021. These were from November 25, 1991, at the Paradiso, Amsterdam, Netherlands, February 1, 1992, at the Palace, Melbourne, Australia, and February 19, 1992, at the Nakano Sunplaza, Tokyo, Japan.

A live performance from August 30, 1992 at the Reading Festival, Reading, England was released on the DVD Live at Reading in 2009, but was cut from the CD version.

=== Certifications ===
| Region | Certification | Certified units/sales |
|---|---|---|
| United States (RIAA) | Gold | 500,000^{‡} |
^{‡} Sales+streaming figures based on certification alone.

== Legacy ==
In 2004, the original song was sampled in The Prodigy's song the "Phoenix", on the album Always Outnumbered, Never Outgunned.

In 2012, a Dutch episode of Classic Recordings about Shocking Blue's album At Home featured a rare interview with guitar player Robbie van Leeuwen and clips of Nirvana's live performance of the song at the Paradiso, Amsterdam. Shocking Blue bassist Klaasje van der Wal was proud of the fact that Nirvana bassist Krist Novoselic once called him a bass god in a blog, while it was said that Van Leeuwen was informed about the Nirvana cover during a visit to Hilversum in the Netherlands. Apparently, he had listened to Bleach in a shop, returned it to his friend without having purchased the album and explained that he did not buy it because he thought the cover was inferior.

As the "Love Buzz" single was released in November 1988, Nirvana were announced in their first year of eligibility as being part of the 2014 class of inductees into the Rock and Roll Hall of Fame on 17 December 2013. In 2017, to mark what would have been Kurt Cobain's 50th birthday, the Phonographic Performance Limited released a list of the top twenty most played Nirvana songs on the TV and radio in the UK in which "Love Buzz" was ranked at number fourteen.

In February, 2021, it was reported that a Nirvana "Love Buzz" single that sold for $3,998.99 was the 99th most expensive item ever sold on the Discogs website. In August, 2021, Nirvana's "Love Buzz" topped Ultimate Guitar's list of the Top 10 Grunge Covers that Beat the Originals. In December 2022, a "Love Buzz" single sold at auction for £2,600 in the United Kingdom.

In April 2025, Nirvana's version was featured on season 2 episode 1 of the HBO series The Last of Us.

In 2026, the season finale of Elle had the band of the character Liz playing "Love Buzz", which she notes as "the cover of a cover" given she was specifically trying to replicate Nirvana's version.
