= Bleach (Nirvana album) =

Studio album by Nirvana
- Released: June 15, 1989
- Recorded: January 23, 1988; June 30, 1988; December 24–31, 1988
- Studios: Reciprocal Recording (Seattle, Washington)
- Genres: Grunge; punk rock; alternative rock; indie rock; sludge metal; hard rock
- Length: 37:21 (original release); 42:44 (1990 CD edition)
- Label: Sub Pop
- Producer: Jack Endino

Nirvana chronology
Bleach (1989)	Blew (1989)

Singles from Bleach
- 1. "Love Buzz" Released: November 1988; 2. "Blew" Released: November 1989

Bleach is the debut studio album by American rock band Nirvana, released on June 15, 1989, by Sub Pop. After the release of their debut single "Love Buzz" on Sub Pop in November 1988, Nirvana rehearsed for two to three weeks in preparation for recording a full-length album. The main recording sessions for Bleach took place at Reciprocal Recording in Seattle, Washington between December 1988 and January 1989. It is the only Nirvana album released on the Sub Pop label.

Bleach did not chart upon initial release, but was well received by critics. When reissued internationally by Geffen Records in 1992 following the breakthrough success of Nirvana's second album, Nevermind (1991), Bleach peaked at number 89 on the Billboard 200, number 33 on the UK Albums Chart, and number 34 on the Australian albums chart. In 2009, Sub Pop released a 20th anniversary edition of Bleach featuring a live recording of a 1990 Nirvana performance in Portland, Oregon as bonus material.

Bleach had sold 40,000 copies in North America before the release of Nevermind. It has since been certified Platinum by the Recording Industry Association of America (RIAA) and has sold more than 1.9 million copies in the United States alone. Frontman Kurt Cobain's death in April 1994 also led to a resurgence in the album's popularity, reaching number one on the Top Pop Catalog Albums chart. In April 2019, Bleach was ranked No. 13 on Rolling Stone's list of the "50 Greatest Grunge Albums".

== Recording ==
After the release of its debut single "Love Buzz" on Sub Pop in November 1988, Nirvana practiced for two to three weeks in preparation for recording a full-length album, even though Sub Pop had only requested an EP. The main sessions for Bleach took place at Reciprocal Recording Studios in Seattle, with local producer Jack Endino.

Nirvana began recording with a five-hour session on December 24, 1988. The band recorded again on December 29–31, and on January 14 and 24. Three of the album's songs – "Floyd the Barber", "Paper Cuts", and "Downer" – were recorded during a previous session at Reciprocal Studios in January 1988, featuring Melvins drummer Dale Crover. Despite attempts to re-record them with new drummer Chad Channing, the band ultimately decided to remix the versions recorded with Crover for the final version of Bleach. "Big Long Now" was omitted from the album because frontman Kurt Cobain felt "there was already enough slow heavy stuff on Bleach, and he 'didn't want that song to go out'", according to Endino. The album was edited and sequenced. Still, Sub Pop head Bruce Pavitt ordered that the album be completely re-sequenced. The record was further delayed for several months until Sub Pop was able to secure sufficient funds to issue it.

Endino billed the band thirty hours of recording at $606.17 ($1,632.35 in 2026). Jason Everman, a guitarist who was impressed by Nirvana's demo with Dale Crover, supplied the money. He briefly joined the group as second guitarist. Everman was credited on the album sleeve and is pictured on the cover, even though he did not perform on the album. Bassist Krist Novoselic explained, "We just wanted to make him feel at home in the band."

== Composition ==
=== Music ===
"About a Girl"
"About a Girl" was written by Kurt Cobain for his then-girlfriend Tracy Marander. Writer Chuck Crisafulli said that it "perfectly captures the rage, hurt, and residual tenderness of a fractured, failing romance and pack[s] it all into verses and choruses that are unstoppably catchy."

"Negative Creep"
"Negative Creep" features Cobain's frantic wails and screaming on top of a repetitious and heavy grunge riff.

According to Cobain, the music on Bleach showcases the grunge and 1970s-influenced heavy rock sound Sub Pop were endorsing. "There was this pressure from Sub Pop and the grunge scene to play 'rock music'", Cobain said, and noted that he "[stripped] it down and [made] it sound like Aerosmith". Cobain also felt he had to fit the expectations of the grunge sound to build a fanbase, and hence suppressed his arty and pop songwriting traits when crafting the record. Critics have also described the album as sludge metal, alternative rock, punk rock, hard rock, and indie rock, with only glimpses of the pop rock seen on the band's succeeding album, Nevermind.

Bleach was heavily influenced by the Seattle-based sludge metal scene of the late 1980s and early 1990s, pioneered by the Melvins. Author Gillian G. Gaar wrote that Bleach "[has] its share – some would say more than its share – of dirty sludge", and Sub Pop describes the single "Love Buzz/Big Cheese" to be "heavy pop sludge". "Love Buzz" is a cover of Dutch band Shocking Blue. The original song is notable for its psychedelic rock style and its extensive use of the sitar.

Novoselic said in a 2001 interview with Rolling Stone that the band had played a tape in their tour van that had an album by the Smithereens on one side and one by the band Celtic Frost on the other, and noted that the combination probably played an influence as well. The songs were described as "deliberately bleak, claustrophobic, and lyrically sparse, with none of the manic derangement or sense of release of the live performance". Cobain said that the song structures were "one–dimensional", and said that he sought to present a more "polished and urbane side of himself".

Describing the various songs on Bleach, Christopher Sandford wrote: "'Paper Cuts' includes a folk-influence melody and ponderous rhythm of an early Led Zeppelin number; 'Mr. Moustache' addressed itself to Nirvana's male fans; 'Downer' showed the same exceptional contempt for the group's audience". Sandford felt "School" – which features only four lines of lyrics – was memorable for its chorus that "served as the rip". While "Scoff" is "a parting salvo at [Cobain's parents]", "Negative Creep" was written by Cobain about himself. According to Sandford, "About a Girl" has a "chiming melody and ironic chorus". In Sounds magazine, Keith Cameron said the song "was exhilarating and it was exciting because that was the nature of the music, but there was also an almost palpable sense of danger, that this whole thing could fall apart any second. There was never any relaxation from the first note to the last". In his book Nirvana: The Stories Behind Every Song, Chuck Crisafulli writes that the song "stands out in the Cobain canon as a song with a very specific genesis and a very real subject".

=== Lyrics ===
In one of his first interviews, Cobain told Sounds journalist John Robb, "When I write a song the lyrics are the least important thing. I can go through two or three different subjects in a song and the title can mean absolutely nothing at all. Sometimes I try to make things harder for myself, just to try to make myself a bit more angry. I try out a few subconscious things I suppose, like conflicts with other people. Most of the lyrics on the Bleach album are about my life in Aberdeen."

In 1993, Cobain told Spin that on Bleach he "didn't give a flying fuck what the lyrics were about" and claimed that 80 percent of the lyrics were written the night before recording. He was often still working on the words on the drive to the recording studio. He explained: "It was like I'm pissed off. Don't know what about. Let's just scream negative lyrics, and as long as they're not sexist and don't get too embarrassing it'll be okay. I don't hold any of those lyrics dear to me." Nirvana biographer Michael Azerrad noted that, nevertheless, many of the songs on the album reflected Cobain and various incidents in his life. "Mr. Moustache" was inspired by Cobain's dislike of macho behavior, while "School" was a critique of the Seattle music scene, particularly Sub Pop.

== Release and promotion ==
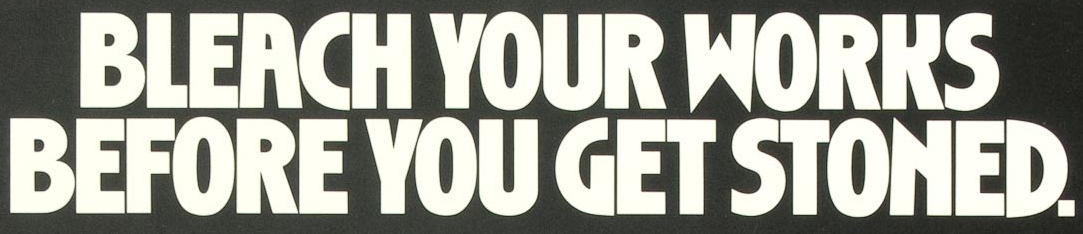
The title of the album refers to the 1980s-era public health posters which urged heroin injectors to use bleach to clean their needles, to prevent HIV transmission.

The album cover was photographed by Cobain's then-girlfriend Tracy Marander during a concert at the Reko Muse art gallery in Olympia, Washington. On February 25, 1989, Nirvana played at venues on the west coast, including the University of Washington. The group began its first European tour, a double headliner with the band Tad, at the Riverside venue in Newcastle upon Tyne on October 23, 1989. On December 3, they played a "triumphant" set at the London Astoria. Christopher Sandford related: "when the style pundits noted Cobain's 'patent lumberjack shirts and ugly fifties geometric-patterned jerseys', seeing an example of 'low-couture chic' they missed the point that flannel shirts and sweaters were everyday dress in the marine climate of the Northwest". Cobain took note and said that he never intended to start a fad or act as a role model.

The album's working title was Too Many Humans. It was renamed Bleach after Cobain found an AIDS prevention poster while Nirvana was driving through San Francisco. The poster advised heroin addicts to bleach their needles before use, featuring the slogan "Bleach Your Works". In Australia, Bleach was released on Waterfront Records and re-issued on various colored covers and colored vinyl prior to 1992. The song "Floyd the Barber" received airplay on Seattle radio station KCMU.

Due to increasing dissatisfaction with Everman over the course of the Bleach tour, Nirvana canceled the last few dates and drove back to Washington. No one told Everman he was fired at the time, while Everman later claimed that he actually quit the group. Although Sub Pop did not promote Bleach as much as other releases, it was a steady seller for a Sub Pop release. However, Cobain was upset by the label's lack of promotion and distribution for the album.

In April 1992, following the success of Nirvana's second album Nevermind, Sub Pop released a remastered version of Bleach on LP, CD and cassette. Geffen Records handled the international release. The CD version was packaged in a cardboard foldout case that included a bonus booklet filled with photos of the band from 1987 to 1990. For the 20th anniversary of the album, Sub Pop released on November 3, 2009 a deluxe reissue of Bleach featuring a March 2009 remastering from the original tapes by George Marino and a live recording of a 1990 show at Portland, Oregon's Pine Street Theatre. Everman is no longer given credit on the album, but can still be seen on the front cover and is given a special thanks in the booklet.

== Reception and legacy ==
Retrospective professional ratings
Review scores
Source	Rating
AllMusic	3.5/5 stars
And It Don't Stop	B+
The A.V. Club	A−
Billboard	4.5/5 stars
Blender	3/5 stars
Pitchfork	8.5/10
Rolling Stone	4/5 stars
The Rolling Stone Album Guide	4/5 stars
Select	4/5
Spin	8/10

Bleach did not sell well but received positive reviews from critics when it was first released. It "became a moderate hit on college radio and the underground/DIY circuit", according to Charles M. Young in The New Rolling Stone Album Guide. In NME, Edwin Pouncey gave Bleach an eight-out-of-ten rating and wrote, "This is the biggest, baddest sound that Sub Pop have so far managed to unearth. So primitive that they manage to make label mates Mudhoney sound like Genesis, Nirvana turn up the volume and spit and claw their way to the top of the musical garbage heap." Melody Maker reviewer Push deemed Nirvana "the only Sub Pop act to date whose songs consistently equal the standard set by their mates Mudhoney". Thurston Moore of Sonic Youth was impressed by the album, finding it "primal" and the songwriting "completely melodious" but also "punk", and during the mastering of Sonic Youth's Goo (1990), Moore expressed his desire for a sound similar to that of Bleach.

In a retrospective review for AllMusic, Stephen Thomas Erlewine opined that "Kurt Cobain illustrated signs of his considerable songcraft" on Bleach, "particularly on the minor-key ballad 'About a Girl' and the dense churn of 'Blew'", summarizing the album as "a debut from a band that shows potential but haven't yet achieved it." Author Dave Thompson stated in 2000 that "history [wouldn't] hear a word against [the album]", but added that if "one just came down from a few decades on Mars, 42 minutes of growly, lo-fi probably wouldn't change your life too much". Robert Christgau wrote in The New Yorker, "Familiar now with Cobain's extraordinary gift, we can hear it loud and clear on the 1989 debut album, Bleach. Cobain's gigantic, goofy, bass-playing buddy Krist Novoselic added drollery to the band's chaotic irreverence." Christgau later commented that while he found Endino's production "way too dry for grunge, a way of music that benefits from extra sputum", he nonetheless considered Bleach "a major album". Anthony Carew from About.com said that Bleach defined "the entire decade of the '90s" and argued that while Nirvana's later albums "were more widely acclaimed, caused a bigger cultural impact, and were generally more accomplished", "the band's essence was at its most essential on their debut."

Before Nevermind was released, Bleach had sold 40,000 copies in North America. The 1992 re-release of the album was more successful on the charts, with Bleach eventually reaching number 89 at the Billboard 200, number 33 on the UK album charts, number 34 on the Australian Recording Industry Association chart, and number 22 on the Finland charts. Kurt Cobain's death in April 1994 also led to a resurgence of popularity, with Bleach entering the Top Pop Catalog chart at number six in the week following his death, and eventually earning the top spot on May 7. The 2009 deluxe edition entered the Catalog Albums chart at number seven. Bleach was certified Platinum by the Recording Industry Association of America in February 1995, and had sold an estimated 1.9 million copies in the United States by September 2016. It has also been certified Gold by the Canadian Recording Industry Association. In 2025, Radio X included the album in its list of "The 25 best indie debut albums of the 1980s".

Bleach remains Sub Pop's best-selling album release to date.

== Track listing ==
All tracks are written by Kurt Cobain, except where noted.

No.	Title	Writer(s)	Length
1.	"Blew"		2:55
2.	"Floyd the Barber"		2:18
3.	"About a Girl"		2:48
4.	"School"		2:42
5.	"Love Buzz" (Shocking Blue cover)	Robbie van Leeuwen	3:35
6.	"Paper Cuts"		4:06
7.	"Negative Creep"		2:56
8.	"Scoff"		4:10
9.	"Swap Meet"		3:03
10.	"Mr. Moustache"		3:24
11.	"Sifting"		5:24
Total length:			37:21

Reissue bonus tracks
No.	Title	Writer(s)	Length
12.	"Big Cheese"	Cobain; Krist Novoselic	3:42
13.	"Downer"		1:44
Total length:			42:45

20th anniversary bonus tracks (Pine Street Theatre live performance recorded February 9, 1990 – Portland, Oregon)
No.	Title	Writer(s)	Length
14.	"Intro"		0:53
15.	"School"		2:36
16.	"Floyd the Barber"		2:17
17.	"Dive"	Cobain; Novoselic	3:42
18.	"Love Buzz" (Shocking Blue cover)	van Leeuwen	2:58
19.	"Spank Thru"		2:59
20.	"Molly's Lips" (The Vaselines cover)	Eugene Kelly; Frances McKee	2:16
21.	"Sappy"		3:19
22.	"Scoff"		3:53
23.	"About a Girl"		2:28
24.	"Been a Son"		2:01
25.	"Blew"		4:32
Total length:			33:45 (76:38)

Notes

- "Love Buzz" was replaced by "Big Cheese" on the 1989 UK release, but included on the 1992 UK CD reissue.
- "Big Cheese" was originally the B-side of "Love Buzz".
- "Downer" is included on the 1990 CD, but not the 1990 cassette. Included on both the 1992 CD and 1992 cassette.
- The 20th anniversary live bonus track "Spank Thru" was previously released as a B-side on CD versions of the "Sliver" single in 1991.
- The 20th anniversary live bonus track "Molly's Lips" was previously released as a single in January 1991.
- The 20th anniversary live bonus track version of "About a Girl" was previously released as a B-side on CD and 12" vinyl versions of the "Sliver" single in 1991.

== Personnel ==
Nirvana

- Kurt Cobain (credited as "Kurdt Kobain") – vocals, guitar
- Krist Novoselic (credited as "Chris Novoselic") – bass
- Chad Channing – drums, tambourine on "About a Girl"
- Jason Everman – guitar (pictured in the cover photo and credited, but did not perform on the album)

Additional personnel

- Dale Crover – drums on "Floyd the Barber", "Paper Cuts" and "Downer"
- Jack Endino – producer
- Tracy Marander – photography
- Charles Peterson – photography
- Lisa Orth – design
- Jane Higgins – execution

== Charts ==
=== Original 1989 release ===
Chart (1989)	Peak position
UK Indie Albums (MRIB)	8
UK Indie Albums (NME)	3
US Progressive Retail (CMJ)	37
US College Radio (CMJ)	22

Chart (1991)	Peak position
UK Indie Albums (NME)	2

Chart (1992)	Peak position
Australian Alternative Albums (ARIA)	2

=== 1992 re-release ===
Chart (1992)	Peak position
Australian Albums (ARIA)	34
Austrian Albums (Ö3 Austria)	26
Belgian Albums (Ultratop Wallonia)	23
Buenos Aires Albums (UPI)	8
European Top 100 Albums (Music & Media)	49
Finnish Albums (The Official Finnish Charts)	22
German Albums (Offizielle Top 100)	24
Japanese Albums (Oricon)	46
New Zealand Albums (RMNZ)	30
UK Albums (Official Charts)	33
UK Indie Albums (Music Week)	5
US Billboard 200	89
US Top 200 Pop Albums (Cashbox)	59

Chart (1994)	Peak position
US Top Catalog Albums (Billboard)	1

=== 20th anniversary edition ===
Chart (2009)	Peak position
Belgian Albums (Ultratop Flanders)	100
UK Albums (OCC)	127
US Top Catalog Albums (Billboard)	7

Chart (2020)	Peak position
UK Independent Albums (Official Charts)	17
UK Rock & Metal Albums (Official Charts)	6

Chart (2021)	Peak position
Belgian Albums (Ultratop Flanders)	25

Chart (2023)	Peak position
Scottish Albums (Official Charts)	42

Chart (2025)	Peak position
Croatian International Albums (HDU)	1

=== Year-end charts ===
1992 year-end chart performance for Bleach
Chart (1992)	Position
Australian Alternative Albums (ARIA)	21

1994 year-end chart performance for Bleach
Chart (1994)	Position
US Top Pop Catalog Albums (Billboard)	29

1995 year-end chart performance for Bleach
Chart (1995)	Position
US Top Pop Catalog Albums (Billboard)	25

2025 year-end chart performance for Bleach
Chart (2025)	Position
Croatian International Albums (HDU)	35

== Certifications ==
Region	Certification	Certified units/sales
Australia (ARIA)	Platinum	70,000^{^}
Canada (Music Canada)	Gold	50,000^{^}
France (SNEP)	2× Gold	200,000^{*}
Italy (FIMI) Sales since 2009	Gold	25,000^{‡}
Poland (ZPAV)	Gold	50,000^{*}
United Kingdom (BPI)	Platinum	300,000^{^}
United States (RIAA)	Platinum	1,900,000
^{*} Sales figures based on certification alone.^{^} Shipments figures based on certification alone.^{‡} Sales+streaming figures based on certification alone.

== Release history ==
Year	Type	Record label	Catalog	Ref
1989	LP record	Sub Pop Records	SP34	
1989	Cassette	Sub Pop Records	SP34a	
1989	Compact disc	Sub Pop Records	SP34b	
1992	CD	Geffen Records	24433	
1995	CD	Geffen Records	1929	
2005	LP record	Phantom Records	TUPLP6	
2005	CD	Warner Music Group	9878700342	
2008	LP record	Warner Music Group	7840034	
2009	LP record	Sub Pop Records	70834	
2009	CD	Sub Pop Records	70834	
2009	CD	Rhino Entertainment	5186561462	

== See also ==
- Sub Pop 200

== Sources ==
- Azerrad, Michael. Come as You Are: The Story of Nirvana. Doubleday, 1993. ISBN 0-385-47199-8
- Berkenstadt, Jim; Cross, Charles. Nevermind: Nirvana. Music Sales Group, 2003. ISBN 0-8256-7286-4
- Cross, Charles. Heavier Than Heaven: A Biography of Kurt Cobain. Hyperion, 2001. ISBN 0-7868-8402-9
- Sandford, Christopher. Kurt Cobain. Da Capo Press, 2004. ISBN 0-7867-1369-0
- True, Everett. Nirvana – The True Story. Omnibus Press, 2006. ISBN 1-84449-640-6
