= Nirvana (band) =

American rock band (1987–1994)

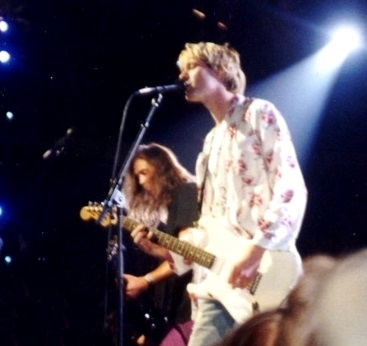
- Kurt Cobain (front) and Krist Novoselic (left) live at the 1992 MTV Video Music Awards.

Background information
- Also known as: Skid Row (1987); Pen Cap Chew (1987); Bliss (1987–1988); Ted Ed Fred (1988)
- Origin: Aberdeen, Washington, U.S.
- Genres: Grunge; alternative rock; punk rock
- Works: Discography; songs; concerts
- Years active: 1987–1994
- Labels: Sub Pop; DGC
- Spinoffs: Foo Fighters
- Spinoff of: Fecal Matter
- Awards: Full list
- Past members: Kurt Cobain; Krist Novoselic; Dave Grohl; See band members section for others
- Website: nirvana.com
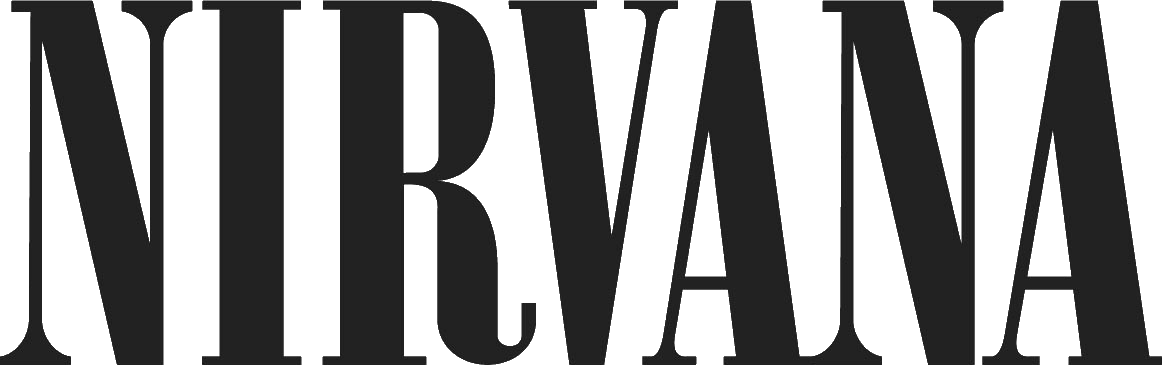

Nirvana was an American rock band formed in Aberdeen, Washington, in 1987. Founded by lead singer and guitarist Kurt Cobain and bassist Krist Novoselic, the band went through a succession of drummers, most notably Chad Channing, before recruiting Dave Grohl in 1990. Nirvana's success popularized alternative rock, and they were often referenced as the flagship band of Generation X. Their music maintains a popular following and continues to influence rock culture.

In the late 1980s, Nirvana established itself as part of the Seattle grunge scene. They released their first album, Bleach, on the independent record label Sub Pop in 1989. Their sound relied on dynamic contrasts, often between quiet verses and loud, heavy choruses. After signing to the major label DGC Records in 1990, Nirvana found unexpected success with "Smells Like Teen Spirit", the first single from its landmark second album, Nevermind (1991). A cultural phenomenon of the 1990s, Nevermind was certified thirteen-times platinum in the US and is credited with ending the popularity of hair metal.

Characterized by a punk aesthetic, Nirvana's fusion of pop melodies with noise, combined with its themes of abjection and social alienation, brought them global popularity. Following extensive touring and the 1992 compilation album Incesticide and EP Hormoaning, the band released its highly anticipated third studio album, In Utero (1993). The album topped both the US and UK album charts, and was acclaimed by critics. However, in April 1994, Nirvana disbanded following Cobain's suicide. Further releases have been overseen by Novoselic, Grohl, and Cobain's widow, Courtney Love. The live album MTV Unplugged in New York (1994) won Best Alternative Music Performance at the 1996 Grammy Awards.

Nirvana is one of the best-selling music artists of all time, having sold 60 million units in the US alone according to the RIAA. During its three years as a mainstream act, Nirvana received an American Music Award, Brit Award, and Grammy Award, as well as seven MTV Video Music Awards and two NME Awards. The band achieved five number-one hits on the Billboard Alternative Songs chart and four number-one albums on the Billboard 200. In 2010, Rolling Stone ranked Nirvana 30th on its list of the 100 Greatest Artists of All Time. They were inducted into the Rock and Roll Hall of Fame in 2014, their first year of eligibility. In 2023, they received the Grammy Lifetime Achievement Award. In 2026, they received the Michael Jackson Video Vanguard Award by MTV.

== History ==
=== 1987–1988: Formation and early years ===
Singer and guitarist Kurt Cobain and bassist Krist Novoselic met while attending Aberdeen High School in Washington state. The pair became friends while frequenting the practice space of the Melvins. Cobain wanted to form a band with Novoselic, but Novoselic did not respond for a long period. Cobain gave him a demo tape of his project Fecal Matter. Three years after the two first met, Novoselic notified Cobain that he had finally listened to the Fecal Matter demo and suggested they start a group. Their first band, the Sellouts, was a Creedence Clearwater Revival tribute band. The project featured Novoselic on guitar and vocals, Cobain on drums, and Steve Newman on bass but only lasted a short time. Another project, this time featuring originals, was also attempted in late 1986. Bob McFadden was enlisted to play drums, but after a month this project also fell through. In early 1987, Cobain and Novoselic recruited drummer Aaron Burckhard. They practiced material from Cobain's Fecal Matter tape but started writing new material soon after forming.

During its initial months, the band went through a series of names, including Skid Row, Pen Cap Chew, Bliss, and Ted Ed Fred. The band played under the name Nirvana for the first time on March 19, 1988, at Community World Theater, Tacoma, Washington, together with the bands Lush and Vampire Lezbos. This concert's flyer, designed by Kurt Cobain, also mentioned all of the previous band names: "Nirvana (also known as... Skid Row, Ted Ed Fred, Pen Cap Chew, Bliss)". The group settled on Nirvana because, according to Cobain, "I wanted a name that was kind of beautiful or nice and pretty instead of a mean, raunchy punk name like the Angry Samoans." The band were initially sued by the British band Nirvana over the usage of the name, reaching an out-of-court settlement. Novoselic moved to Tacoma and Cobain to Olympia, Washington. They temporarily lost contact with Burckhard, and instead practiced with Dale Crover of the Melvins, with whom Nirvana recorded its first demos in January 1988.

In early 1988, Crover moved to San Francisco but recommended Dave Foster as his replacement on drums. Foster's tenure with Nirvana was a rocky one; during a stint in jail, he was replaced by Burckhard, who again departed after telling Cobain he was too hungover to practice one day. Foster would rejoin the band, but after Cobain and Novoselic were introduced to drummer Chad Channing, the band would permanently dismiss him (although not before Foster witnessed the group play live without him). Channing continued to jam with Cobain and Novoselic; however, by Channing's account, "They never actually said 'okay, you're in.'" Channing played his first show with Nirvana in late May 1988.

=== 1988–1990: Early releases ===
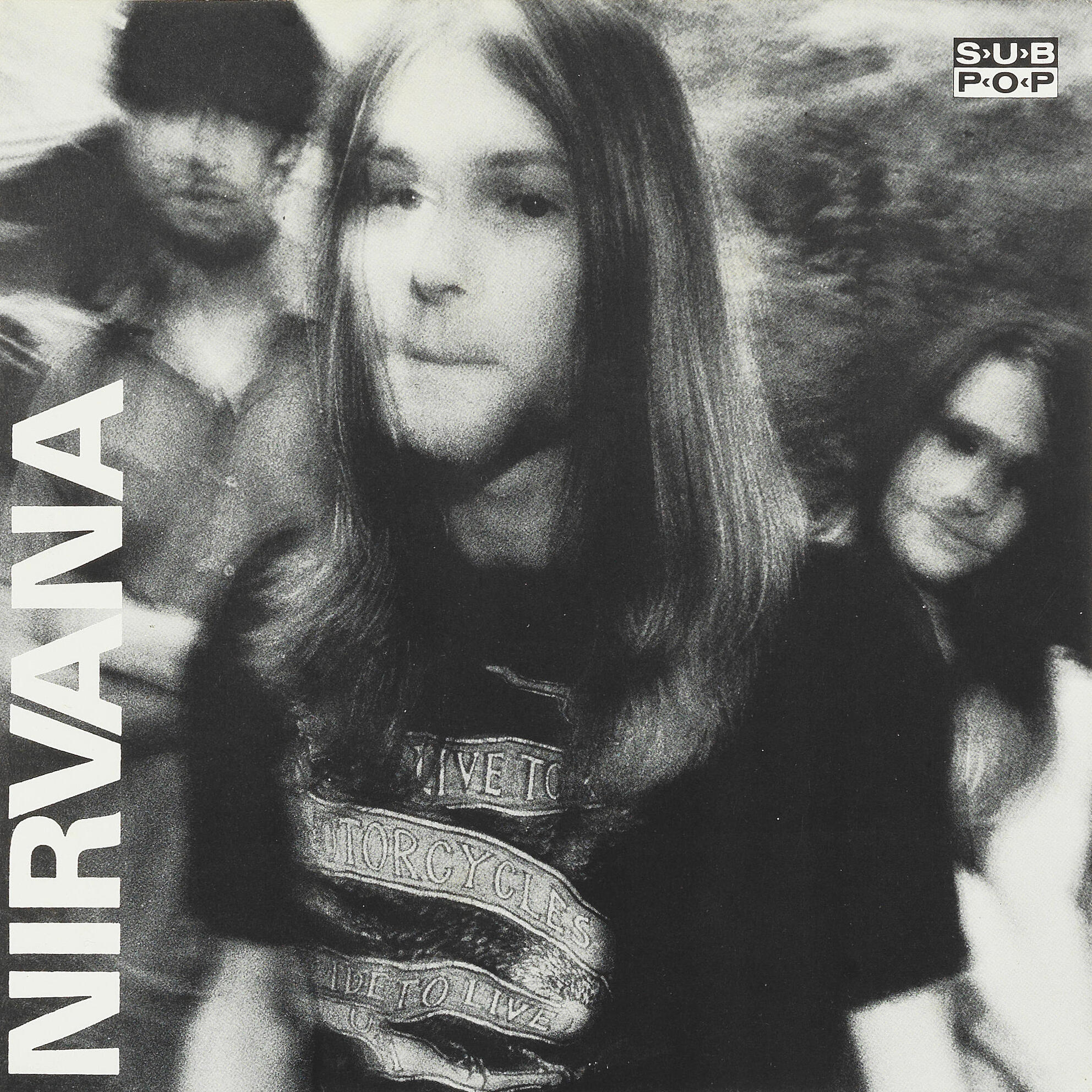
The front cover of Nirvana's first single "Love Buzz" (1988)

Nirvana released its first single, a cover of Shocking Blue's "Love Buzz", in November 1988 on the Seattle independent record label Sub Pop. They did their first interview with John Robb in Sounds, which made their release its single of the week. The following month, the band began recording its debut album, Bleach, with local producer Jack Endino. Bleach was influenced by the heavy dirge-rock of the Melvins, the 1980s punk rock of Mudhoney, and the 1970s heavy metal of Black Sabbath. The money for the recording sessions for Bleach, listed as $606.17 on the album sleeve, was supplied by Jason Everman, who was subsequently brought into the band as the second guitarist. Though Everman did not play on the album, he received a credit on Bleach because, according to Novoselic, they "wanted to make him feel more at home in the band". Prior to the album's release, Nirvana became the first band to sign an extended contract with Sub Pop.

Bleach was released in June 1989, and became a favorite of college radio stations. Nirvana embarked on its first national tour, but canceled the last few dates and returned to Washington state due to increasing differences with Everman. No one told Everman he was fired; Everman later said he had quit. Although Sub Pop did not promote Bleach as much as other releases, it was a steady seller, and had initial sales of 40,000 copies. However, Cobain was upset by the label's lack of promotion and distribution. In late 1989, Nirvana recorded the Blew EP with producer Steve Fisk. In an interview with Robb, Cobain said the band's music was changing: "The early songs were really angry... But as time goes on the songs are getting poppier and poppier as I get happier and happier. The songs are now about conflicts in relationships, emotional things with other human beings."

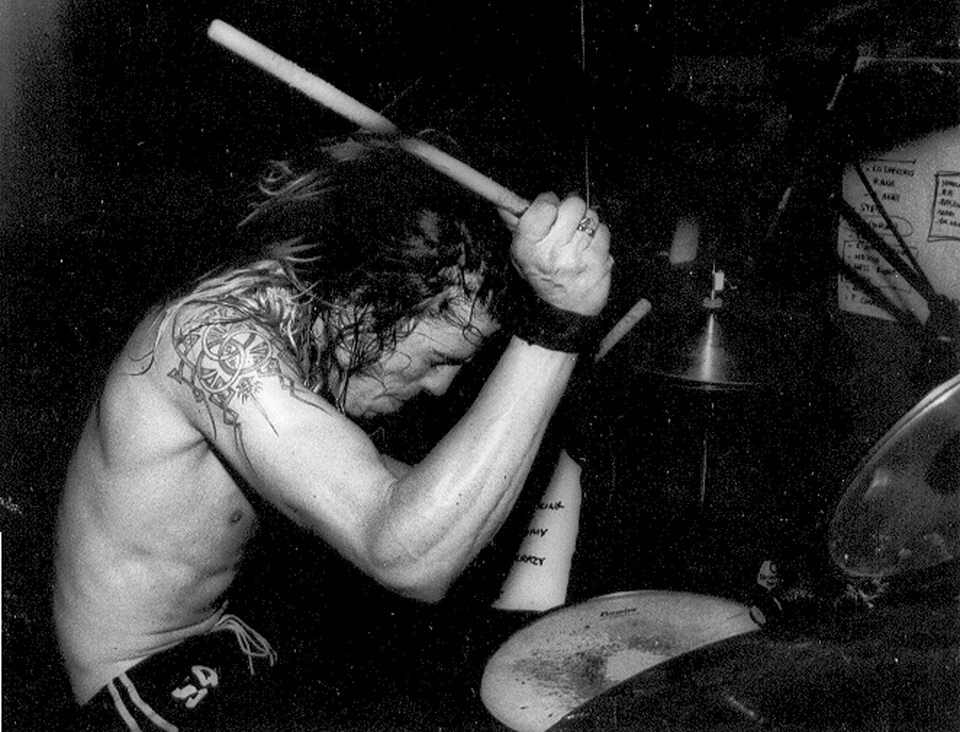
Grohl performing with Scream in 1989

In April 1990, Nirvana began working on their next album with producer Butch Vig at Smart Studios in Madison, Wisconsin. Cobain and Novoselic became disenchanted with Channing's drumming, and Channing expressed frustration at not being involved in songwriting. As bootlegs of Nirvana demos with Vig began to circulate in the music industry and draw attention from major labels, Channing left the band. That July, Nirvana recorded the single "Sliver" with Mudhoney drummer Dan Peters. Dale Crover filled in on drums on Nirvana's seven-date American West Coast tour with Sonic Youth that August.

In September 1990, Buzz Osborne of the Melvins introduced the band to drummer Dave Grohl, whose Washington, D.C. band Scream had broken up. Grohl auditioned for Novoselic and Cobain days after arriving in Seattle; Novoselic later said, "We knew in two minutes that he was the right drummer." Grohl told Q: "I remember being in the same room with them and thinking, 'What? That's Nirvana? Are you kidding?' Because on their record cover they looked like psycho lumberjacks... I was like, 'What, that little dude and that big motherfucker? You're kidding me'."

=== 1991–1992: Nevermind and mainstream breakthrough ===
Disenchanted with Sub Pop, and with the Smart Studios sessions generating interest, Nirvana sought a deal with a major record label since no indie label could buy them out of their contract. Cobain and Novoselic consulted Soundgarden and Alice in Chains manager Susan Silver for advice. They met Silver in Los Angeles and she introduced them to agent Don Muller and music business attorney Alan Mintz, who specialized in finding deals for new bands. Mintz started sending out Nirvana's demo tape to major labels looking for deals. Following repeated recommendations by Sonic Youth's Kim Gordon, Nirvana signed to DGC Records in 1990. When Nirvana was inducted into the Rock and Roll Hall of Fame in 2014, Novoselic thanked Silver during his speech for "introducing them to the music industry properly".

After signing, the band began recording its first major label album, Nevermind. The group was offered a number of producers, but held out for Vig. Rather than record at Vig's Madison studio as they had in 1990, production shifted to Sound City Studios in Van Nuys, Los Angeles, California. For two months, the band worked through a variety of songs. Some, such as "In Bloom" and "Breed", had been in Nirvana's repertoire for years, while others, including "On a Plain" and "Stay Away", lacked finished lyrics until midway through the recording process. After the recording sessions were completed, Vig and the band set out to mix the album. However, the recording sessions had run behind schedule and the resulting mixes were deemed unsatisfactory. Slayer mixer Andy Wallace was brought in to create the final mix. After the album's release, members of Nirvana expressed dissatisfaction with the polished sound that Wallace had given Nevermind.

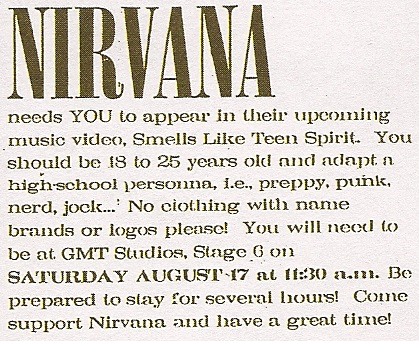
Announcement from the band encouraging people to participate in the making of the music video for "Smells Like Teen Spirit"

Initially, DGC Records was hoping to sell 250,000 copies of Nevermind, the same they had achieved with Sonic Youth's Goo. However, the first single, "Smells Like Teen Spirit", quickly gained momentum, boosted by major airplay of the music video on MTV. As it toured Europe during late 1991, the band found that its shows were dangerously oversold, that television crews were becoming a constant presence onstage, and that "Smells Like Teen Spirit" was almost omnipresent on radio and music television. By Christmas 1991, Nevermind was selling 400,000 copies a week in the US. In January 1992, the album displaced Michael Jackson's Dangerous at number one on the Billboard album charts and topped the charts in numerous other countries. The month Nevermind reached number one, Billboard proclaimed, "Nirvana is that rare band that has everything: critical acclaim, industry respect, pop radio appeal, and a rock-solid college/alternative base." The album eventually sold over seven million copies in the United States and over 30 million worldwide. Nirvana's sudden success was credited for popularizing alternative rock and ending the popularity of hair metal.

Citing exhaustion, Nirvana did not undertake another American tour in support of Nevermind, and made only a handful of performances later that year. In March 1992, Cobain sought to reorganize the group's songwriting royalties (which to this point had been split equally) to better represent that he wrote the majority of the music. Grohl and Novoselic did not object, but when Cobain wanted the agreement to be retroactive to the release of Nevermind, the disagreements came close to breaking up the band. After a week of tension, Cobain received a retroactive share of 75 percent of the royalties. Bad feelings about the situation remained within the group afterward.

Amid rumors that the band was disbanding due to Cobain's health, Nirvana headlined the closing night of the 1992 Reading Festival in England. Cobain programmed the performance lineup. Nirvana's performance at Reading is often regarded as one of the most memorable of their career. A few days later, Nirvana performed at the MTV Video Music Awards; despite the network's refusal to let the band play the new song "Rape Me", Cobain strummed and sang the first few bars of the song before breaking into "Lithium". The band received awards for the Best Alternative Video and Best New Artist categories.

DGC had hoped to have a new Nirvana album ready for a late 1992 holiday season; instead, it released the compilation album Incesticide in December 1992. A joint venture between DGC and Sub Pop, Incesticide collected various rare Nirvana recordings and was intended to provide the material for a better price and higher quality than bootlegs. As Nevermind had been out for 15 months and had yielded a fourth single in "In Bloom" by that point, Geffen/DGC opted not to heavily promote Incesticide, which was certified gold by the Recording Industry Association of America the following February.

=== 1993: In Utero ===
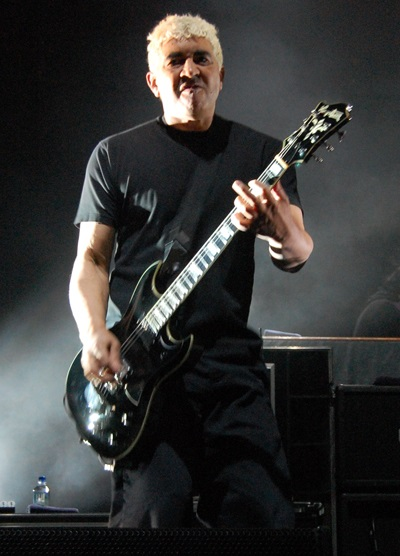
Nirvana added an extra guitarist, Pat Smear (pictured in 2008), for the In Utero tour.

In February 1993, Nirvana released "Puss" / "Oh, the Guilt", a split single with the Jesus Lizard, on the independent label Touch & Go. For their third album, Nirvana chose producer Steve Albini, who had a reputation as principled and opinionated in the American indie music scene. While some speculated that Nirvana chose Albini for his underground credentials, Cobain said they chose him for his "natural" recording style, without layers of studio trickery. Albini and Nirvana recorded the album in two weeks in Pachyderm Studio in Cannon Falls, Minnesota, that February for $25,000.

After its completion, stories ran in the Chicago Tribune and Newsweek that quoted sources claiming DGC considered the album "un-releasable". Fans became concerned that Nirvana's creative vision might be compromised by their label. While the stories about DGC shelving the album were untrue, the band was unhappy with certain aspects of Albini's mixes; they thought the bass levels were too low, and Cobain felt that "Heart-Shaped Box" and "All Apologies" did not sound "perfect". The longtime R.E.M. producer Scott Litt was called in to remix the two songs, with Cobain adding more instrumentation and backing vocals.

In Utero topped the American and British album charts. Time critic Christopher John Farley wrote in his review, "Despite the fears of some alternative-music fans, Nirvana hasn't gone mainstream, though this potent new album may once again force the mainstream to go Nirvana." In Utero went on to sell more than five million copies in the United States. That October, Nirvana embarked on its first tour of the United States in two years, with support from Half Japanese and the Breeders. For the tour, the band added Pat Smear of the punk rock band Germs as the second guitarist.

In November, Nirvana recorded a performance for the television program MTV Unplugged. Augmented by Smear and cellist Lori Goldston, they broke convention for the show by choosing not to play their best known songs. Instead, they performed several covers, and invited Cris and Curt Kirkwood of the Meat Puppets to join them for renditions of three Meat Puppets songs.

In early 1994, Nirvana embarked on a European tour. Their final concert took place in Munich, Germany, on March 1. In Rome, on the morning of March 4, Cobain's wife, Courtney Love, found Cobain unconscious in their hotel room and he was rushed to the hospital. Cobain had reacted to a combination of prescribed rohypnol and alcohol. The rest of the tour was canceled.

=== 1994–1996: Death of Cobain and disbandment ===
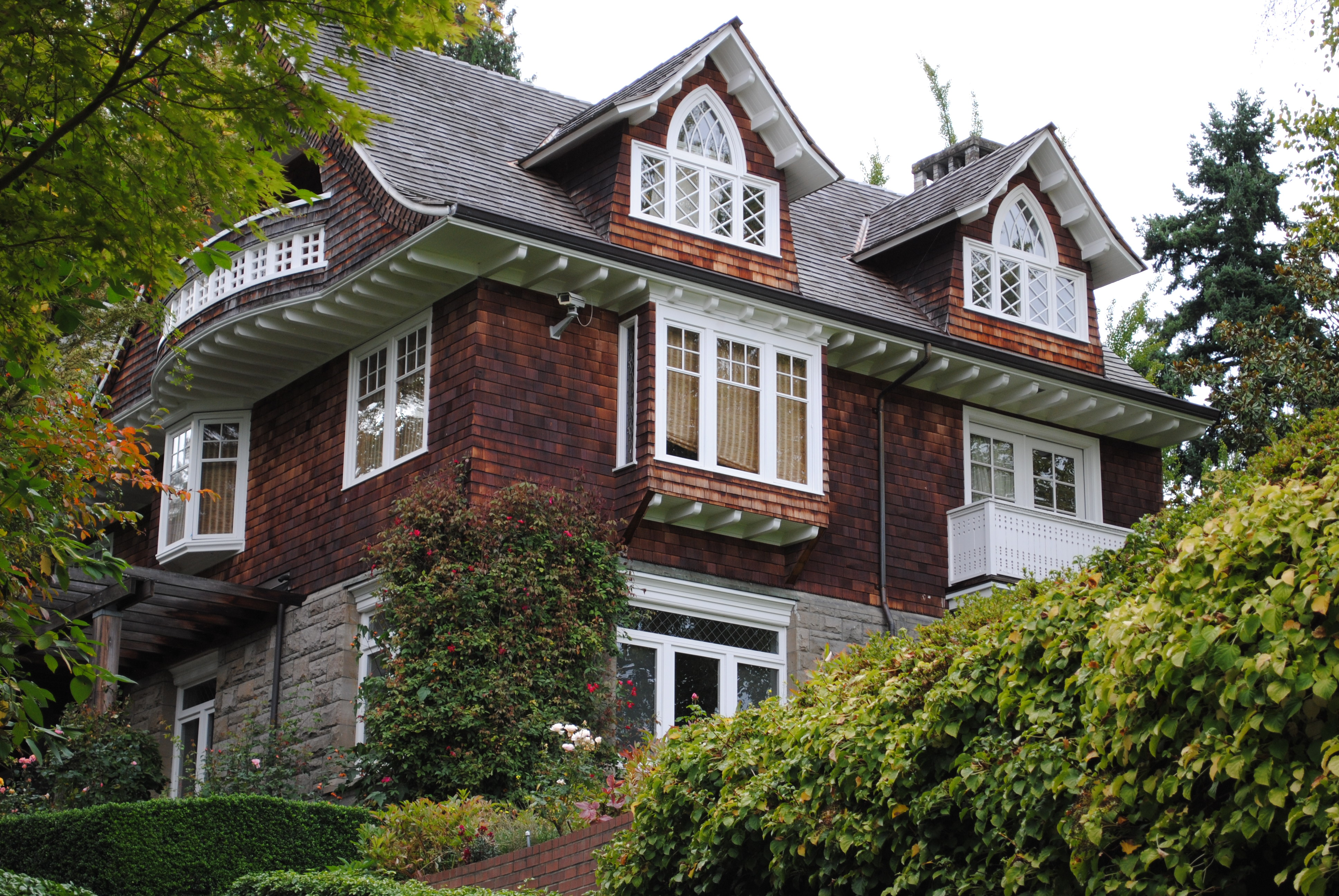
Cobain's house in Seattle, where he was found dead in April 1994

In the weeks following his hospitalization in Rome, Cobain's heroin addiction resurfaced. Following an intervention, he was persuaded to enter drug rehabilitation. After less than a week, Cobain scaled the 6-foot wall and escaped, then returned to Seattle. On April 6, 1994, it was announced that Nirvana withdrew from their planned appearance at the Lollapalooza 94 tour due to Cobain's ongoing health problems, with reports that they had broken up. Two days later, on April 8, Cobain was found dead of a self-inflicted shotgun wound to the head at his home in the Denny-Blaine neighborhood of the city. He had died approximately three days earlier. Until the discovery of his body, Cobain had been missing since escaping the rehabilitation center.

Cobain's death drew international attention and became a topic of public fascination and debate. Within hours, stocks ran low of Nirvana records in stores, and Nirvana sales rose dramatically in the United Kingdom. Unused tickets for Nirvana concerts sold for inflated prices on the used market. The inflation was triggered by the manager of Brixton Academy, who lied on BBC Radio 1 that fans were purchasing tickets as a "piece of history", in an effort to retain the money he stood to lose from ticket refunds. A public vigil for Cobain was held on April 10, 1994, at a park at Seattle Center, drawing approximately 7,000 mourners, followed by a final ceremony on May 31, 1999.

In 1994, Grohl founded a new band, the Foo Fighters. He and Novoselic decided against Novoselic joining. Grohl said it would have felt "really natural" for them to work together again, but would have been uncomfortable for the other band members and placed more pressure on Grohl. Novoselic turned his attention to political activism.

Plans for a live Nirvana album, Verse Chorus Verse, were canceled as Novoselic and Grohl found assembling the material so soon after Cobain's death emotionally overwhelming. Instead, in November 1994, DGC released the MTV Unplugged performance as MTV Unplugged in New York. It debuted at number one on the Billboard charts and earned Nirvana a Grammy Award for Best Alternative Music Album at the 1996 Grammys. It was followed by Nirvana's first full-length VHS live video, Live! Tonight! Sold Out!!. In 1996, the live album From the Muddy Banks of the Wishkah became the third consecutive Nirvana release to debut at the top of the Billboard album chart.

=== 1997–2005: Conflicts with Courtney Love ===
In 1997, Novoselic, Grohl and Love formed the limited liability company Nirvana LLC to oversee Nirvana projects. A 45-track box set of Nirvana rarities was scheduled for release in October 2001. However, shortly before the release date, Love filed a suit to dissolve Nirvana LLC, and an injunction was issued preventing the release of any new Nirvana material until the case was resolved. Love contended that Cobain was Nirvana, that Grohl and Novoselic were sidemen, and that she had signed the partnership agreement originally under bad advice. Grohl and Novoselic countersued, asking the court to remove Love from the partnership and to replace her with another representative of Cobain's estate.

The day before the case was set to go to trial in October 2002, Love, Novoselic, and Grohl announced that they had reached a settlement. The next month, the best-of compilation Nirvana was released, featuring the previously unreleased track "You Know You're Right", the last song Nirvana recorded. It debuted at number three on the Billboard album chart. The box set, With the Lights Out, was released in November 2004. The release contained early Cobain demos, rough rehearsal recordings, and live tracks. An album of selected tracks from the box set, Sliver: The Best of the Box, was released in late 2005.

=== 2006–present: Further reissues and reunions ===
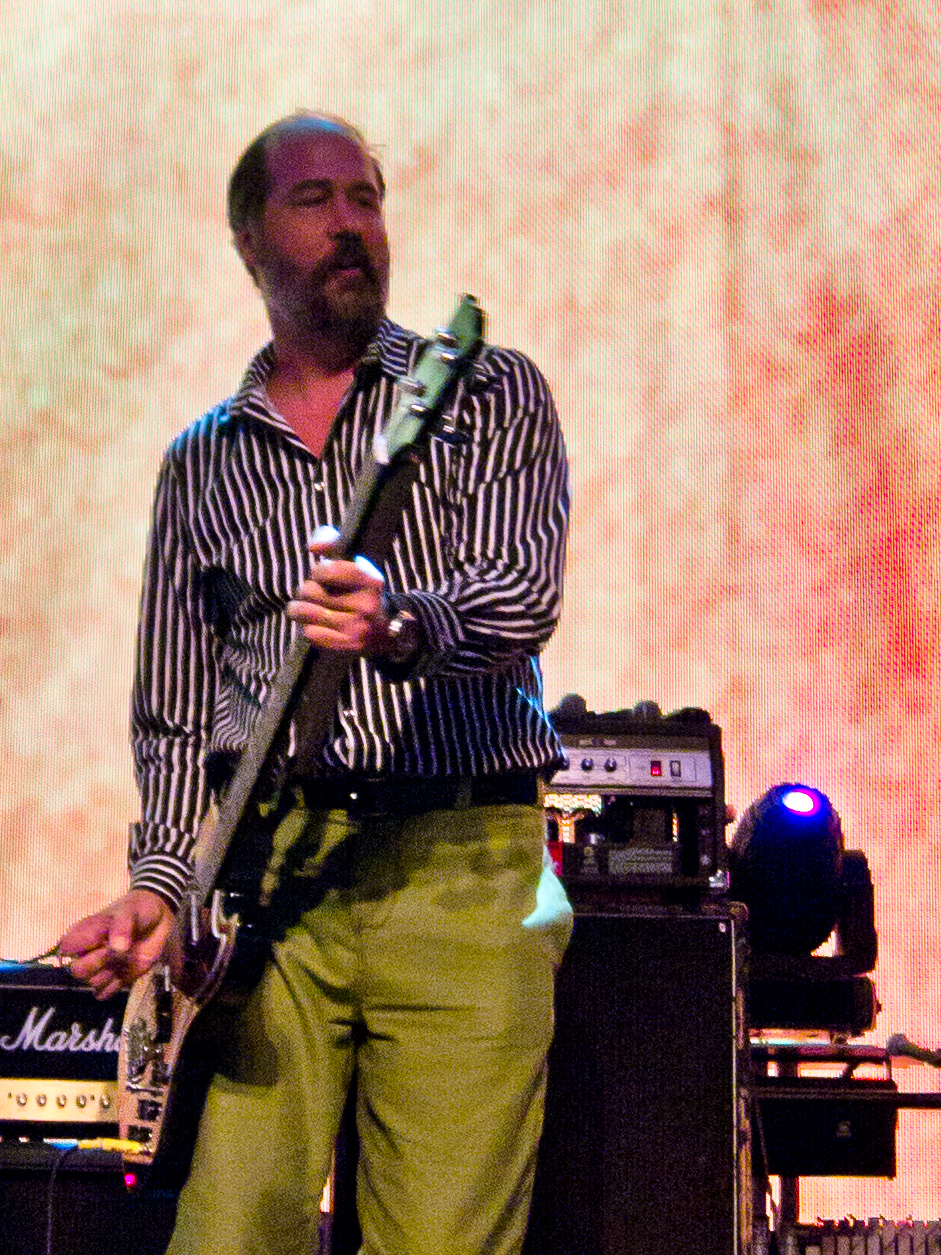
Krist Novoselic in 2011

In April 2006, Love sold 25 percent of her stake in the Nirvana song catalog to Primary Wave for an estimated $50 million. She sought to assure Nirvana's fanbase that the music would not simply be licensed to the highest bidder: "We are going to remain very tasteful and true to the spirit of Nirvana while taking the music to places it has never been before."

Live! Tonight! Sold Out!!, was re-released on DVD in 2006, followed by the full version of MTV Unplugged in New York on DVD in 2007. In November 2009, Nirvana's performance at the 1992 Reading Festival was released on CD and DVD as Live at Reading, alongside a deluxe 20th-anniversary edition of Bleach. DGC released a number of 20th-anniversary deluxe packages of Nevermind in September 2011, which included the Live at the Paramount show, and of In Utero in September 2013, which included the Live and Loud show.

In 2012, Grohl, Novoselic, and Smear joined Paul McCartney at 12-12-12: The Concert for Sandy Relief. The performance featured the premiere of a new song written by the four, "Cut Me Some Slack". A studio recording was released on the soundtrack to Sound City, a documentary film by Grohl. On July 19, 2013, the group played with McCartney again during the encore of his Safeco Field "Out There" concert in Seattle, the first time Nirvana members had performed together in their hometown in over 15 years.

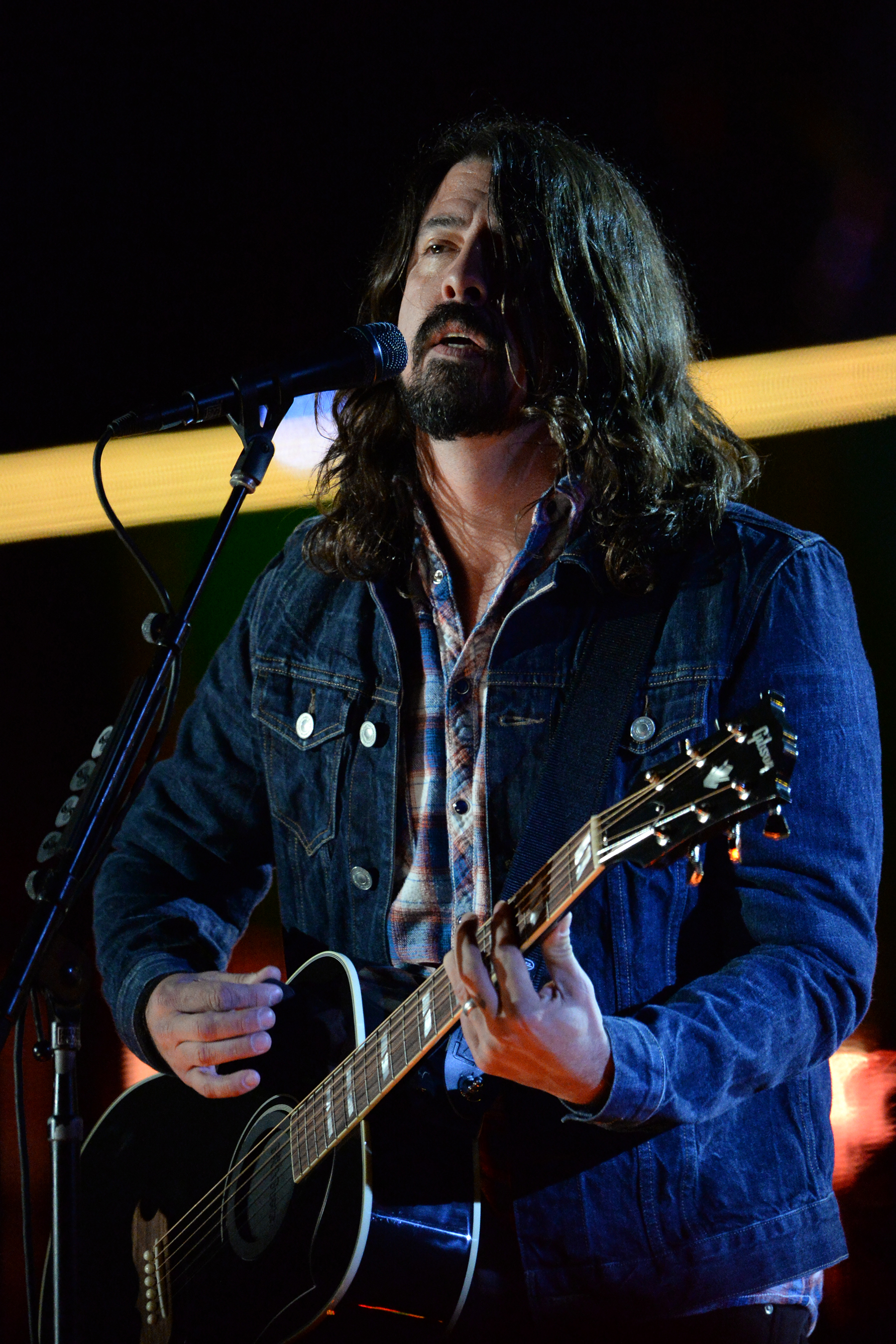
Dave Grohl in 2014

In 2014, Cobain, Novoselic, and Grohl were inducted into the Rock and Roll Hall of Fame. At the induction ceremony, Novoselic, Grohl and Smear performed a four-song set with guest vocalists Joan Jett, Kim Gordon, St. Vincent and Lorde. Novoselic, Grohl and Smear then performed a full show at Brooklyn's St. Vitus Bar with Jett, Gordon, St. Vincent, J Mascis and John McCauley as guest vocalists. Grohl thanked Burckhard, Crover, Peters and Channing for their time in Nirvana. Everman also attended.

At Clive Davis' annual pre-Grammy party in 2016, Novoselic and Grohl reunited to perform the David Bowie song "The Man Who Sold the World", which Nirvana had covered in their MTV Unplugged performance. Beck accompanied them on acoustic guitar and vocals. In October 2018, Novoselic and Grohl reunited during the finale of the Cal Jam festival at Glen Helen Amphitheater in San Bernardino County, California, joined by Jett and John McCauley on vocals. In January 2020, Novoselic and Grohl reunited for a performance at a benefit for the Art of Elysium at the Hollywood Palladium, joined by Beck, St Vincent, and Grohl's daughter Violet.

For the 30th anniversary of Nevermind, in September 2021, the BBC broadcast the documentary When Nirvana Came to Britain, featuring interviews with Grohl and Novoselic. That month, a 30th-anniversary edition of Nevermind was announced, containing 70 previously unreleased live tracks from four concerts and a Blu-ray of Live in Amsterdam. For the 30th anniversary of In Utero, DGC reissued it in several formats on October 27, 2023, which included the full 1993 show at the Great Western Forum in Los Angeles and the 1994 show at the Seattle Centre Arena.

On January 30, 2025, Novoselic, Grohl and Smear reunited for the first time in five years to perform at the Fire Aid benefit concert in Los Angeles. They were joined by St. Vincent for "Breed", Kim Gordon for "School", Joan Jett for "Territorial Pissings", and Violet Grohl for "All Apologies". For the 50th anniversary celebrations for Saturday Night Live on February 14, Novoselic, Grohl and Smear reunited to perform "Smells Like Teen Spirit" with Post Malone.

== Artistry ==
=== Musical style and influences ===
Nirvana's musical style has been mainly described as grunge, alternative rock, and punk rock. They have also been labeled as hard rock. Characterized by their punk aesthetic, Nirvana often fused pop melodies with noise. Billboard described their work as a "genius blend of Kurt Cobain's raspy voice and gnashing guitars, Dave Grohl's relentless drumming and Krist Novoselic's uniting bass-work that connected with fans in a hail of alternately melodic and hard-charging songs".

Cobain described Nirvana's initial sound as "a Gang of Four and Scratch Acid ripoff". When Nirvana recorded Bleach, Cobain felt he had to fit the expectations of the Sub Pop grunge sound to build a fanbase, and suppressed his arty and pop songwriting in favor of a more rock sound. Nirvana biographer Michael Azerrad argued, "Ironically, it was the restrictions of the Sub Pop sound that helped the band find its musical identity." Azerrad stated that by acknowledging that they had grown up listening to Black Sabbath and Aerosmith, they had been able to move on from their derivative early sound.

Nirvana used dynamic shifts that went from quiet to loud. Cobain sought to mix heavy and pop musical sounds, saying, "I wanted to be totally Led Zeppelin in a way and then be totally extreme punk rock and then do real wimpy pop songs." He said that the Stooges' 1973 release, Raw Power, was his favorite album. When Cobain heard the Pixies' 1988 album, Surfer Rosa, after recording Bleach, he felt it had the sound he wanted to achieve but had been too intimidated to try. The Pixies' subsequent popularity encouraged Cobain to follow his instincts as a songwriter. Like the Pixies, Nirvana moved between "spare bass-and-drum grooves and shrill bursts of screaming guitar and vocals". Near the end of his life, Cobain said the band had become bored of the "limited" formula, but expressed doubt that they were skilled enough to try other dynamics.

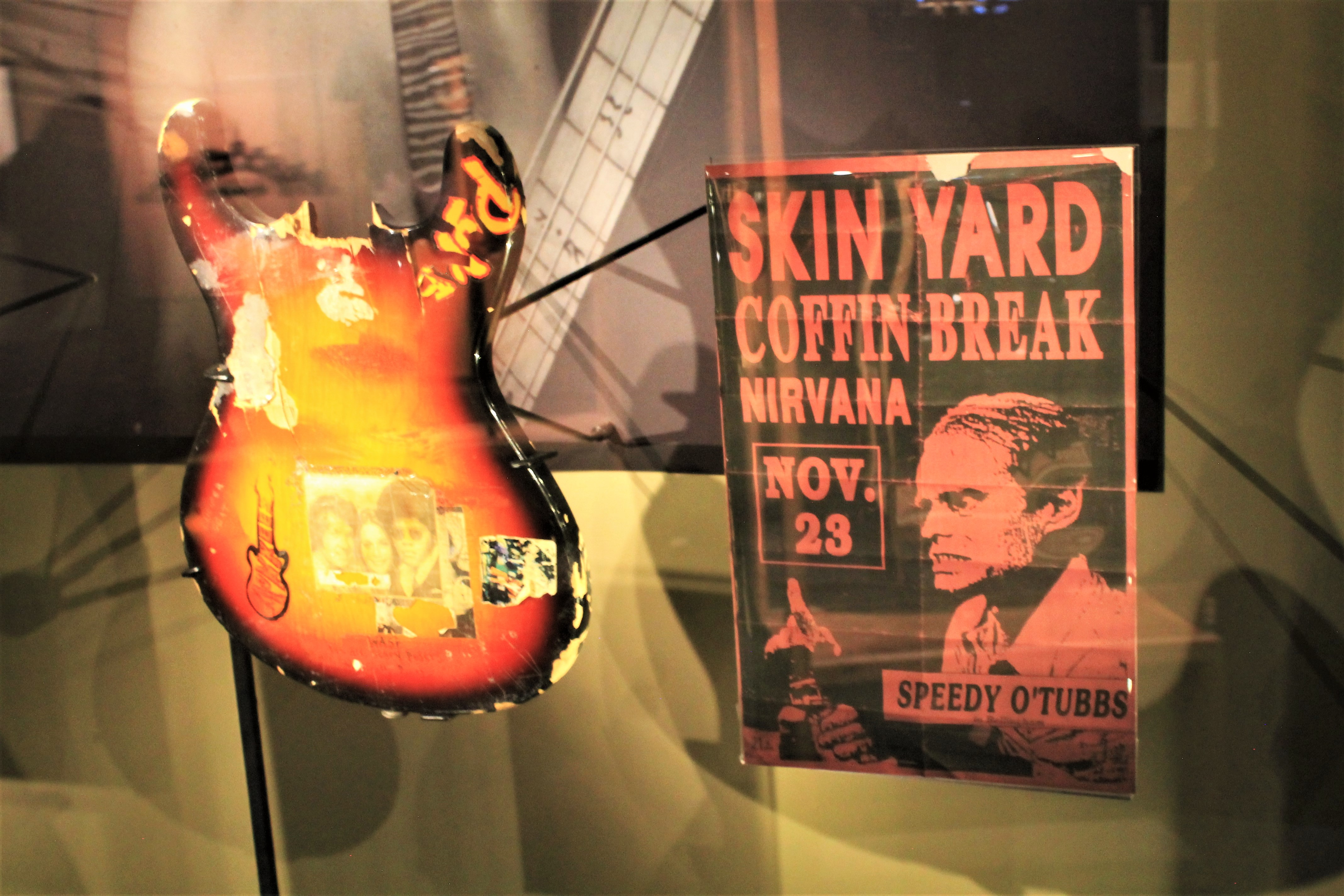
Bottom half of guitar smashed by Kurt Cobain, displayed at MOPOP

=== Instrumentation and live performances ===
Cobain's rhythm guitar style, which relied on power chords, low-note riffs, and a loose left-handed technique, featured the key components to the band's songs. Cobain would often initially play a song's verse riff in a clean tone, then double it with distorted guitars when he repeated the part. In some verses, the guitar would be absent to allow the drums and bass guitar to support the vocals, or it would only play sparse melodies like the two-note pattern used in "Smells Like Teen Spirit". Cobain rarely played standard guitar solos, opting to play variations of the song's melody as single-note lines. Cobain's solos were mostly blues-based and discordant, which music writer Jon Chappell described as "almost an iconoclastic parody of the traditional instrumental break", a quality typified by the note-for-note replication of the lead melody in "Smells Like Teen Spirit" and the atonal solo for "Breed". The band had no formal musical training; Cobain said: "I have no concept of knowing how to be a musician at all whatsoever... I couldn't even pass Guitar 101."

Grohl's drumming "took Nirvana's sound to a new level of intensity," according to Guitar World. Azerrad stated that Grohl's "powerful drumming propelled the band to a whole new plane, visually as well as musically", noting, "Although Dave is a merciless basher, his parts are also distinctly musical—it wouldn't be difficult to figure out what song he was playing even without the rest of the music".

Until early 1992, the band had performed live in concert pitch. They began tuning down either a half step or full step as well as concert pitch. Sometimes all three tunings would be in the same show. By the summer of that year, the band had settled on the half step down tuning (E♭). Cobain said, "We play so hard we can't tune our guitars fast enough". The band made a habit of destroying its equipment after shows. Novoselic said he and Cobain created the "shtick" in order to get off the stage sooner. Cobain stated it began as an expression of his frustration with previous drummer Channing making mistakes and dropping out entirely during performances.

=== Songwriting and lyrics ===
Everett True said in 1989, "Nirvana songs treat the banal and pedestrian with a unique slant". Cobain came up with the basic components of each song, usually writing them on an acoustic guitar, as well as the singing style and the lyrics. He emphasized that Novoselic and Grohl had a large part in deciding the lengths and parts of songs, and that he did not like to be considered the sole songwriter.

Cobain usually wrote lyrics for songs minutes before recording them. Cobain said, "When I write a song the lyrics are the least important subject. I can go through two or three different subjects in a song and the title can mean absolutely nothing at all". Cobain told Spin in 1993 that he "didn't give a flying f–k [sic]" what the lyrics on Bleach were about, figuring "Let's just scream negative lyrics, and as long as they're not sexist and don't get too embarrassing it'll be okay", while the lyrics to Nevermind were taken from two years of poetry he had accumulated, which he cut up and chose lines he preferred from. In comparison, Cobain stated that the lyrics to In Utero were "more focused, they're almost built on themes". Cobain did not write in a linear fashion, instead relying on juxtapositions of contradictory images to convey emotions and ideas. Often in his lyrics, Cobain would present an idea then reject it; he said, "I'm such a nihilistic jerk half the time and other times I'm so vulnerable and sincere [.. The songs are] like a mixture of both of them. That's how most people my age are."

== Legacy ==
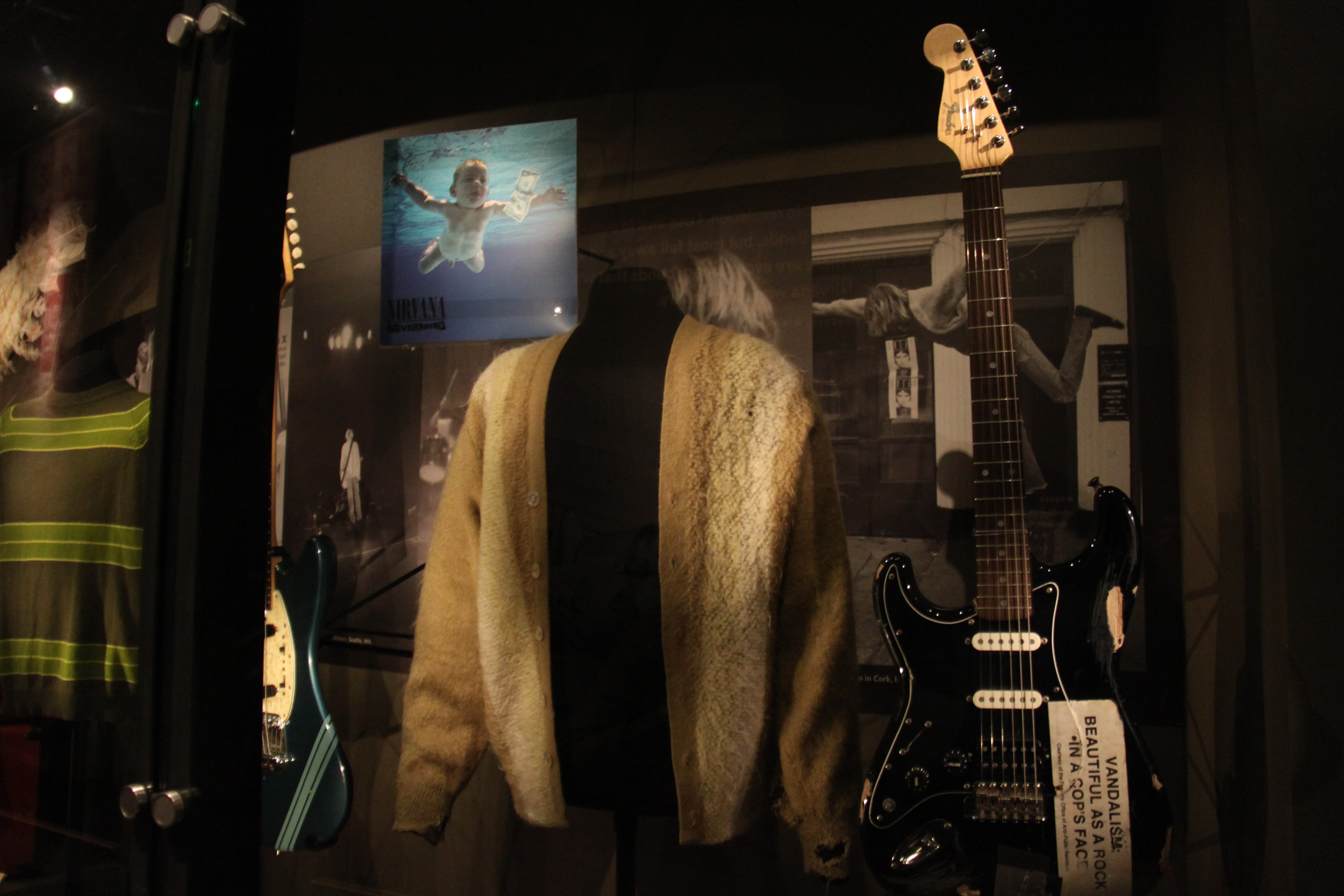
Nirvana articles at the Museum of Pop Culture in Seattle, Washington

Combined with their themes of abjection and alienation, Nirvana became hugely popular during their short tenure and are credited with bringing alternative rock to the mainstream. Stephen Thomas Erlewine of AllMusic wrote that prior to Nirvana, "alternative music was consigned to specialty sections of record stores, and major labels considered it to be, at the very most, a tax write-off". Following the release of Nevermind, "nothing was ever quite the same, for better and for worse". While other alternative bands had achieved hits, Nirvana "broke down the doors forever", according to Erlewine; the breakthrough "didn't eliminate the underground", but rather "just gave it more exposure". Erlewine also wrote that Nirvana "popularized so-called 'Generation X' and 'slacker' culture". Following Cobain's death, numerous headlines referred to Nirvana's frontman as "the voice of a generation", although he had rejected such labeling during his lifetime.

In 1992, Jon Pareles of The New York Times reported that Nirvana had made other alternative acts impatient for similar success: "Suddenly, all bets are off. No one has the inside track on which of dozens, perhaps hundreds, of ornery, obstreperous, unkempt bands might next appeal to the mall-walking millions." Record company executives offered large advances and record deals to bands, and previous strategies of building audiences for alternative rock groups were replaced by the opportunity to achieve mainstream popularity quickly.

Michael Azerrad argued in his Nirvana biography Come as You Are: The Story of Nirvana (1993) that Nevermind marked an epochal generational shift in music similar to the rock-and-roll explosion in the 1950s and the end of the baby boomer generation's dominance of the musical landscape. Azerrad wrote, "Nevermind came along at exactly the right time. This was music by, for, and about a whole new group of young people who had been overlooked, ignored, or condescended to." Fugazi frontman Guy Picciotto said "It was like our record could have been a hobo pissing in the forest for the amount of impact it had ... It felt like we were playing ukuleles all of a sudden because of the disparity of the impact of what they did."

Nirvana are one of the best-selling bands of all time, having sold more than 75 million records. With 32 million RIAA-certified units, they are also one of the bestselling music artists in the United States. They have achieved 10 Top 40 hits on the Billboard Alternative Songs chart, including five number-ones. Two of their studio albums and two of their live albums have reached the top spot on the Billboard 200. Nirvana have been awarded one diamond, three multiplatinum, seven platinum and two gold-certified albums in the United States by the RIAA, and four multiplatinum, four platinum, two gold and one silver-certified albums in the UK by the BPI. Nevermind, their most successful album, has sold more than 30 million copies worldwide, making it one of the best-selling albums ever. Their most successful song, "Smells Like Teen Spirit", is among the bestselling singles of all time, having been certified diamond with sales of 10 million copies.

== Awards and accolades ==
Since their breakup, Nirvana have continued to receive acclaim. In 2003, they were selected as one of the inductees of the Mojo Hall of Fame 100. The band also received a nomination in 2004 from the UK Music Hall of Fame for the title of "Greatest Artist of the 1990s". Rolling Stone placed Nirvana at number 27 on their list of the "100 Greatest Artists of All Time" in 2004, and at number 30 on their updated list in 2011. In 2003, the magazine's senior editor David Fricke picked Kurt Cobain as the 12th best guitarist of all time. Rolling Stone later ranked Cobain as the 45th greatest singer in 2008 and 73rd greatest guitarist of all time in 2011. VH1 ranked Nirvana as the 42nd greatest artists of rock and roll in 1998, the 7th greatest hard rock artists in 2000, and the 14th greatest artists of all time in 2010.

Nirvana's contributions to music have also received recognition. The Rock and Roll Hall of Fame has inducted two of Nirvana's recordings, "Smells Like Teen Spirit" and "All Apologies", into its list of "The Songs That Shaped Rock and Roll". The museum also ranked Nevermind number 10 on its "The Definitive 200 Albums of All Time" list in 2007. In 2005, the Library of Congress added Nevermind to the National Recording Registry, which collects "culturally, historically or aesthetically important" sound recordings from the 20th century. In 2011, four of Nirvana's songs appeared on Rolling Stone's updated list of "The 500 Greatest Songs of All Time", with "Smells Like Teen Spirit" ranking the highest at number 9. Three of the band's albums were ranked on the magazine's 2012 list of "The 500 Greatest Albums of All Time", with Nevermind placing the highest at number 17. The same three Nirvana albums were also placed on Rolling Stone's 2011 list of "The 100 Best Albums of the Nineties", with Nevermind ranking the highest at number 1, making it the greatest album of the decade. Time included Nevermind on its list of "The All-TIME 100 Albums" in 2006, labeling it "the finest album of the 1990s". In 2011, the magazine also added "Smells Like Teen Spirit" on its list of "The All-TIME 100 Songs", and "Heart-Shaped Box" on its list of "The 30 All-TIME Best Music Videos". Pitchfork ranked Nevermind and In Utero as the sixth and thirteenth greatest albums of the 1990s, describing the band as "the greatest and most legendary band of the 1990s."

Nirvana was announced in their first year of eligibility as being part of the 2014 class of inductees into the Rock and Roll Hall of Fame on December 17, 2013. The induction ceremony was held April 10, 2014, in Brooklyn, New York, at the Barclays Center. As the accolade was only applied to Cobain, Novoselic and Grohl, former drummer Chad Channing was not included in the induction and was informed of his omission by text message. Channing attended the ceremony, where Grohl publicly thanked him for his contributions and noted that he had written some of Nirvana's most recognized drum parts. In 2023, Nirvana (represented by Novoselic, Grohl, and Smear) were awarded a Lifetime Achievement Award at the 2023 Grammy Awards. The band received the Michael Jackson Video Vanguard Award at the 2026 MTV Video Music Awards.

== Band members ==
Final lineup

- Kurt Cobain – lead vocals, guitars (1987–1994; his death)
- Krist Novoselic – bass (1987–1994; all reunion performances), occasional vocals (1987–1994), accordion (1993–1994)
- Dave Grohl – drums, backing vocals (1990–1994; all reunion performances)

Former

- Aaron Burckhard – drums (1987, 1988)
- Dale Crover – drums (1988, 1990), backing vocals (1988)
- Dave Foster – drums (1988)
- Chad Channing – drums (1988–1990)
- Jason Everman – guitar, backing vocals (1989)
- Dan Peters – drums (1990)

Touring

- John Duncan – guitar (1993)
- Lori Goldston – cello (1993–1994)
- Pat Smear – guitar, backing vocals (1993–1994; all reunion performances)
- Melora Creager – cello (1994)

== Discography ==
- Bleach (1989)
- Nevermind (1991)
- In Utero (1993)

== See also ==
- List of alternative rock artists
- List of musicians from Seattle
- List of Nirvana concerts
