= Blew =

1989 single and EP by Nirvana

EP by Nirvana
- Released: November 1989
- Recorded: June/December 1988 (side one); September 1989 (side two)
- Studios: Reciprocal Recording (Seattle, Washington); The Music Source (Seattle)
- Genres: Grunge; garage rock; sludge metal
- Length: 11:32
- Label: Tupelo Records
- Producers: Jack Endino, Steve Fisk

Nirvana chronology
Bleach (1989)	Blew (1989)	Nevermind (1991)

Nirvana singles chronology
"Love Buzz" (1988)	"Blew" (1989)	"Sliver" (1990)

"Blew" is a song by American rock band Nirvana, written by vocalist and guitarist Kurt Cobain. It is the first song on the band's debut album Bleach, released in June 1989 by Sub Pop.

The song was re-released on Tupelo Records as the title track of a four-song EP in the United Kingdom in November 1989, where it charted at number 15 on the UK Indie Singles chart.The EP is best known for its disastrous 1989 European tour.

== Background and recording ==
"Blew" was first performed live at the Community World Theatre in Tacoma, Washington, on March 19, 1988. This was also the first show the band played with their name as Nirvana.

The song was first recorded in the studio by Jack Endino at Reciprocal Recording Studios in Seattle, Washington on June 11, 1988, during the recording sessions for what became the band's debut single, "Love Buzz".

=== Bleach ===
A second studio version was recorded by Endino at Reciprocal in December 1988, and was released on Bleach on June 15, 1989.

The Bleach version of "Blew" was accidentally recorded one step lower than the band had intended, which contributed to what Nirvana biographer Michael Azerrad called its "extraordinarily heavy sound". Not realizing that they had already tuned to their favored D Standard tuning, the band tuned further down to Drop C on the first day of the sessions and recorded several songs in that tuning. As bassist Krist Novoselic recalled in a 2009 Seattle Times article, "we came back the next day and decided the idea wasn't so hot, and we recorded over most of it with things tuned back up a little. In fact, 'Blew', with that growly bass, is the only survivor of that experiment."

==== Blew EP ====
The Bleach version of "Blew" was re-released on the Blew EP in November 1989, along with the Bleach mix of "Love Buzz" and the previously unreleased songs "Been a Son" and "Stain", which had been recorded by Steve Fisk at Music Source in Seattle, Washington in September 1989. The band's original plan had been to release an EP to promote their upcoming European tour, but the EP was delayed and released exclusively in the United Kingdom a few days before the final tourdate in London. However, the EP built on the interest the band had generated in the UK with Bleach, and was promoted by English DJ John Peel, who had also played Bleach on his influential show. The Blew EP eventually peaked at number 15 on the UK Indie chart.

=== Post-Bleach ===
"Blew" was one of only three songs from Bleach, along with "About a Girl" and "School", that remained in the band's setlists until the end of their touring career. It was performed live for the final time in Munich, Germany on March 1, 1994, as the second-to-last song preceding "Heart-Shaped Box".

== Composition and lyrics ==
"Blew"
A 16-second sample of the chorus from "Blew"

"Blew" is a grunge, sludge metal, alternative rock, garage rock, hard rock and sludge punk song, with inspiration from 1970s heavy rock, similar to most Sub Pop releases of the time. Alexis Petridis of The Guardian described the song as "sludgy riffs" meeting "Ramones-ish third wall breaking." According to the sheet music published at Musicnotes.com by BMG Rights Management, the song is written in the key of C major, and is moderately fast with a tempo of 144 beats per minute. Cobain's vocal range spans two octaves, from D_{4} to A_{5}.

The lyrics to "Blew" are a topic of debate among fans and critics alike. Many believe they reflect Kurt Cobain's experience growing up in Aberdeen, Washington, a small logging town. Nirvana, like many others from small towns, expressed a desire to move beyond their childhood environments. In his 1993 biography on the band, Come As You Are: The Story of Nirvana, Azerrad described the song as having a "theme of entrapment and control."

== EP ==
The Blew EP was released in November 1989 on Tupelo Records on 12-inch vinyl and CD. With a working title of Winnebago, the EP was originally intended as a release to promote an upcoming European tour, but due to production delays, the maxi-single ended up being released exclusively in the United Kingdom a few days before the tour's completion.

Released exclusively in the UK, the EP was difficult to obtain elsewhere, with only 3,000 copies of the maxi-single pressed on 12-inch vinyl and CD. Both vinyl and CD counterfeit copies exist, with the vinyl copies varying in color. The official 12-inch vinyl was pressed only on black vinyl. The cover art was photographed by Cobain's then-girlfriend Tracy Marander at a May 26, 1989 concert at the Green River Community College in Auburn, Washington. Marander shot the back cover photo as well.

"Stain" was re-released by DGC Records in December 1992, on the band's rarities compilation, Incesticide. The Blew version of "Been a Son", hailed by Kurt St. Thomas as the "definitive take" due to its trashy sound and pronounced bass solo, remained a rarity until it was re-released in October 2002 on the band's first best-of compilation, Nirvana.

== 1989 Europe Tour ==
By the release of the EP, Sub Pop had already planned for Nirvana to tour in Europe. Cobain had been convinced that the band would achieve greater success overseas, although he had personally never left North America beforehand. Nirvana was paired with fellow grunge rock band Tad, who were also under Sub Pop at the time. The budget of the tour was tight, having both bands share a single Fiat van, which could barely house their merchandise and equipment for the tour. Loading into the van would take up to an hour, and "resembled something out of a Marx Brothers’ routine." Nirvana was also expected to play 37 shows across 9 nations across Europe, all in 47 days.

While Cobain had anticipated much success for the band in Europe, the opposite would become true. For much of the tour, Tad frontman Tad Doyle would suffer from severe gastrointestinal issues, prompting him to vomit frequently. He would also experience constant diarrhea, with the band having to stop by the road for "bathroom emergencies." 5 weeks in, during a show in Rome, after Tad had played for the crowd, Cobain went through a mental breakdown on stage. Annoyed by difficulties with the sound system, after 40 minutes in, Cobain climbed 30 feet up a stack of speakers, and threated to kill himself.

Sub Pop co-founders Jonathan Poneman and Bruce Pavitt had flown in to Rome, which added tension between them and Cobain, as he constantly compared Nirvana's poor touring conditions with their "the jet-setting style." 5 shows after the Rome incident, Cobain would once again break down on stage in Nirvana's last show for the tour, in London, bloodying his knees. By the end of the tour, he had emotionally distanced himself from Sub Pop, and Nirvana would departure from the label by 1991.

== Critical reception ==
Professional ratings
Review scores
Source	Rating
AllMusic	3/5 stars

In 2009, Krist Novoselic of Seattle Weekly said that "Blew" was perhaps his favorite song on Bleach "because it has a groove, and again, it's the sole survivor of the Doom Pop experiment." Stephen Thomas Erlewine of AllMusic praised the song's "dense churn" as an early example of Cobain's "considerable songcraft."

In 2015, Richard Bienstock of Rolling Stone listed "Blew" at number 22 on their ranking of 102 Nirvana songs. In 2023, the A.V. Club ranked it at number 29 in their list of Nirvana's "30 greatest songs."

== Track listing ==
All tracks are written by Kurt Cobain, except where noted.

Side one
No.	Title	Writer(s)	Length
1.	"Blew"		2:56
2.	"Love Buzz" (Shocking Blue cover)	Robbie van Leeuwen	3:36
Total length:			6:32

Side two
No.	Title	Length
3.	"Been a Son"	2:22
4.	"Stain"	2:38
Total length:		5:00 11:32

- "Blew" and "Love Buzz" were previously released on Nirvana's 1989 debut album Bleach, but "Love Buzz" was not included on the original 1989 UK version. In its place was "Big Cheese", the B-side to the US "Love Buzz" single. Therefore, the Blew EP was the first time that "Love Buzz" was officially released in the UK. However, "Love Buzz" was included on the 1992 UK re-issue of Bleach.
- "Been a Son" was later released on the 2002 "best-of" compilation, Nirvana. An alternate version appeared on the 1992 compilation, Incesticide.
- "Stain" was later released on Incesticide.

== Charts ==
Chart (1989)	Peak position
UK Indie Singles (MRIB)	15
UK Indie Singles (NME)	8

== Accolades ==
Year	Publication	Country	Accolade	Rank
2023	The A.V. Club	United States	Essential Nirvana: Their 30 greatest songs, ranked	29

== Other releases ==
- A live version, recorded at the Pine Street Theatre in Portland, Oregon on February 9, 1990, was released in November 2009 on the 20th anniversary "Deluxe" version of Bleach, which featured the complete Pine Street show as bonus material.
- A live version, recorded at the Paramount Theatre in Seattle on October 31, 1991, appeared on the live video Live at the Paramount, released in September 2011.
- A live version, recorded at the Paradiso in Amsterdam, Netherlands on November 25, 1991, appeared as the final track on the live compilation, From the Muddy Banks of the Wishkah, in November 1996. Video of this version of the song was released in November 2006, when it appeared on the bonus disc of DVD release of Live! Tonight! Sold Out!!. The full Paradiso show was released on CD and Blu Ray on the 30th anniversary "Deluxe" and "Super Deluxe" versions of Nevermind in November 2021.
- The 30th anniversary "Deluxe" and "Super Deluxe" versions of Nevermind also featured live performances of "Blew" from the band's shows at The Palace in Melbourne, Australia on February 1, 1992, and the Nakano Sunplaza in Tokyo, Japan on February 19, 1992.
- A live version, from the band's appearance at the 1992 Reading Festival in Reading, England on August 30, 1992, was released on CD and DVD on Live at Reading in November 2009.
- A live version, from the band's performance on December 13, 1993 at Pier 48 in Seattle, Washington, recorded for MTV, was released on the live video Live and Loud in September 2013.
- Two live versions of "Blew," from the band's concerts at the Great Western Forum in Inglewood, California on December 30, 1993, and at the Seattle Center Arena in Seattle on January 7, 1994, appear on the 30th anniversary "Super Deluxe" reissue of Nirvana's final studio album, In Utero, released in October 2023.

== Personnel ==
Nirvana

- Kurt Cobain – guitar, vocals
- Krist Novoselic – bass guitar
- Chad Channing – drums

Production

- Jack Endino – production for "Blew" and "Love Buzz"
- Steve Fisk – production for "Stain" and "Been a Son"

Additional personnel

- Tracy Marander – photography

== See also ==
- Experiencing Nirvana: Grunge in Europe, 1989
