= Bazillion Points =

Book publishing company

- Status: Active
- Founded: 2007
- Founder: Ian Christe
- Country of origin: United States
- Headquarters location: Brooklyn
- Distribution: Self-distributed (US); Turnaround Publisher Services (UK)
- Publication types: Books
- Nonfiction topics: Underground music, Heavy metal, Punk rock, Thrash metal, Hardcore punk, Death metal, Rock biographies, Cult film
- Official website: bazillionpoints.com

Bazillion Points is a heavy metal- and punk rock-oriented book publishing company founded and operated by author and SiriusXM radio host Ian Christe. It was founded in 2007 and is headquartered in New York. The outfit has successfully produced numerous books by authors recognized as key figures in the creation and development of heavy metal, hardcore punk, thrash metal, death metal, black metal, grunge, progressive heavy metal, and other originally DIY / underground musical movements. These books are known for their authenticity and striking graphic design, and many have found critical acclaim in the New York Times, The New Yorker, Los Angeles Times, Newsweek, The Guardian, Rolling Stone, Playboy, Pitchfork, Entertainment Weekly, and elsewhere.

== Books ==
- Swedish Death Metal, by Daniel Ekeroth. Foreword by Chris Reifert of Autopsy (ISBN 978-09796163-1-0) Released July 29, 2008.
- Once upon a Nightwish: The Official Biography 1996–2006, by Mape Ollila (ISBN 978-09796163-2-7) Released December 29, 2008.
- Sheriff McCoy: Outlaw Legend of Hanoi Rocks, by Andy McCoy (ISBN 978-09796163-0-3) Released September 22, 2009.
- Hellbent for Cooking: The Heavy Metal Cookbook, by Annick Giroux (ISBN 978-19359500-0-4) Released December 1, 2009.
- Only Death Is Real: An Illustrated History of Hellhammer and Early Celtic Frost, by Tom Gabriel Fischer (AKA Tom G Warrior) and Martin Eric Ain. Foreword by Nocturno Culto (ISBN 978-09796163-9-6) Released March 30, 2010.
- Touch and Go: The Complete Hardcore Punk Zine '79-'83", by Tesco Vee and Dave Stimson. Forewords by Keith Morris, John Brannon, Henry Rollins, Ian MacKaye, Peter Davis (ISBN 978-09796163-8-9) Released June 30, 2010.
- Mean Deviation: Four Decades of Progressive Heavy Metal, by Jeff Wagner. Foreword by Steven Wilson of Porcupine Tree (ISBN 978-09796163-3-4) Released December 1, 2010.
- Swedish Sensationsfilms: A Clandestine History of Sex, Thrillers, and Kicker Cinema, by Daniel Ekeroth. Foreword by Christina Lindberg (ISBN 978-09796163-6-5) Released April 1, 2011.
- Metalion: The Slayer Mag Diaries, by Jon Kristiansen. Forewords by Ian Christe, Fenriz, Chris Reifert, Tomas Lindberg, Erik Danielsson, Stephen O'Malley (ISBN 978-09796163-4-1) Released July 19, 2011
- Dirty Deeds: My Life Inside/Outside of AC/DC, by Mark Evans (ISBN 978-19359500-4-2) Released December 13, 2011.
- Murder in the Front Row: Shots From the Bay Area Thrash Metal Epicenter, by Harald Oimoen and Brian Lew. Forewords by Ron Quintana, Gary Holt, Alex Skolnick, and Robb Flynn (ISBN 978-19359500-3-5) Released January 24, 2012.
- We Got Power!: Hardcore Punk Scenes from 1980s Southern California, by David Markey and Jordan Schwartz, including essays by Jennifer Schwartz, Henry Rollins, Keith Morris, Chuck Dukowski, Dez Cadena, Louiche Mayorga, Cameron Jamie, Pat Fear, Steve Humann, Tony Adolescent, Jack Brewer, Jula Bell, Mike Watt, Sean Wheeler, Joe Carducci, Daniel "Shredder" Weizmann, and Janet Housden (ISBN 978-1-935950-07-3) Released October 30, 2012.
- What Are You Doing Here?: A Black Woman's Life and Liberation in Heavy Metal, by Laina Dawes. Foreword by Skin of Skunk Anansie (ISBN 978-1-935950-05-9) Released January 8, 2013.
- Experiencing Nirvana: Grunge in Europe, 1989, by Bruce Pavitt (ISBN 978-1-935950-10-3) Released December 24, 2014.
- Heavy Metal Movies: Guitar Barbarians, Mutant Bimbos & Cult Zombies Amok in the 666 Most Ear- and Eye-Ripping Big-Scream Films Ever!, by Mike "McBeardo" McPadden (ISBN 978-1-935950-06-6). Released June 24, 2014.
- SLAYER MAG X, by Jon Kristiansen. Hardcover reissue release of the tenth issue of Norway's Slayer Mag fanzine (1994). Released May, 2014.
- Sub Pop U.S.A.: The Subterraneanan Pop Music Anthology, 1980–1988, by Bruce Pavitt. Forewords by Calvin Johnson, Gerard Cosloy, Ann Powers, Larry Reid, Charles R. Cross (ISBN 978-1-935950-11-0). Released December 9, 2014.
- NYHC: New York Hardcore, 1980–1990, by Tony Rettman. Foreword by Freddy Cricien (ISBN 978-1-935950-12-7). Released December 30, 2014.
- City Baby: Surviving in Leather, Bristles, Studs, Punk Rock, and G.B.H, by Ross Lomas (ISBN 978-1935950158). Released November 24, 2015
- Choosing Death: The Improbable History of Death Metal & Grindcore, by Albert Mudrian. Forewords by DJ John Peel and Scott Carlson (ISBN 978-1-935950-16-5). Released November 22, 2016
- Misery Obscura: The Photography of Eerie Von (1981-2009), by Eerie Von. Foreword by Lyle Preslar (ISBN 978-1-935950-19-6). Released November 29, 2016
- Straight Edge: A Clear-Headed Hardcore Punk History, by Tony Rettman. Foreword by Anthony "Civ" Civarelli (ISBN 978-1-935950-24-0). Released November 14, 2017
- Teen Movie Hell: A Crucible of Coming-of-Age Comedies from Animal House to Zapped!, by Mike "McBeardo" McPadden (ISBN 978-1-935950-23-3). Released April 16, 2019
- Texas Is the Reason: The Mavericks of Lone Star Punk, by Pat Blashill. Forewords by Richard Linklater, David Yow, Teresa Taylor, Ash Shown, and Donna Rich (ISBN 978-1-935950-17-2). Released February 14, 2020
- I'm Not Holding Your Coat: My Bruises-and-All Memoir of Punk Rock Rebellion, by Nancy Barile. Includes foreword conversation with Ian MacKaye (ISBN 978-1-935950-20-2). Released June 15, 2021
- Denim and Leather: The Rise and Fall of the New Wave of British Heavy Metal, by Michael Hann (ISBN 978-1-935950-25-7) Released December 6, 2022
- United Forces: An Archive of Brazil's Raw Metal Attack, 1986-1991, by Marcelo R. Batista. Includes foreword conversation with Max Cavalera and Iggor Cavalera (ISBN 978-1-935950-21-9) Released September 7, 2023
- Midnight: A Thousand Nights in Sodom, by Hannah Verbeuren. Foreword by Athenar of Midnight. (ISBN 978-1-935950-22-6) Released August 14, 2024
- Mellodrama, the Mellotron Story: How Harry Chamberlin's Magic Box Set Loose the Beatles, Prog Rock, Post-Punk, and Free Bird, by Dianna Dilworth. Foreword by Mike Pinder of the Moody Blues (ISBN 978-1-935950-08-0) . Forthcoming
- Link Wray: First Man in Black, by Dana Raidt. Forthcoming

== DVDs ==
- Mellodrama: The Mellotron Movie, by Dianna Dilworth (UPC 705105476964) Released January 19, 2010
