= Ian Christe =

Swiss author

Ian Christe (born 21 March 1970 in Biel/Bienne) is a Swiss/American author, disc jockey and the publisher of Bazillion Points Books. He attended Mynderse Academy, The Clarkson School's Bridging Year, and Indiana University Bloomington (1987–1990).

== Writing ==
Christe is the author of the heavy metal history book Sound of the Beast: The Complete Headbanging History of Heavy Metal, published in English in hardcover in 2003 and subsequently translated into French, German, Finnish, Spanish, Japanese, Portuguese, Croatian, Italian, Czech, Serbian, and Polish. His first published work was in the IAN fanzine. His first paid articles appeared in Creem Thrash Metal, a late-1980s offshoot of Creem.

As a freelance magazine writer, his articles appeared in Rolling Stone, Popular Mechanics, Spin, AP, Wired, Revolver, CMJ, Stance, Bananafish, Mother Jones, The Baffler, the Chicago Reader, Warp, Blender, Salon.com, HotWired, Mass Appeal, the Utne Reader, I.D., and Guitar World.

He has penned liner notes to releases by Megadeth, Death, Mantas, Grave, William Hooker, and others.

== Broadcasting ==
A weekly metal history radio show known as Bloody Roots was launched in 2004 based on Sound of the Beast, on the "Hard Attack / Liquid Metal station of Sirius XM Radio. Hosted by Christe, the show focuses on specific eras or styles of heavy metal, with Christe discussing them in-depth. He also hosted a brief daily spot on the Sirius Buzzsaw channel for several years. He first started as a radio host at WEOS-FM in Geneva, New York, at age 14.

Christe has also made film and television appearances on VH1 Classic, MTV2, VH1, and several metal-related documentaries, including Last Days Here, Heavy: The Story of Metal, and Metal Evolution.

== Music ==
His unusual metal band, Dark Noerd the Beholder, appears on the soundtrack to the cult film Gummo. Christe also toured as a member of the Jad Fair solo band. He recorded with the New York-based bluegrass band Grouse Mountain Skyride with cartoonists Dame Darcy and Christine Shields, and the experimental drone metal band Kuboaa with Jan Kotik and Stephen O'Malley. He performed during 2000 and 2001 as singer with the Jacques Dutronc "couvert" band Les Opportunistes, one of the first bands of the early 2000s Brooklyn rock renaissance.

== Publishing ==
In 2007, Christe launched Bazillion Points Publishing to promote books by deserving like-minded authors.

On June 30, 2010, Bazillion Points Publishing released Touch and Go: The Complete Hardcore Punk Zine '79-'83 by Tesco Vee and Dave Stimson. The book chronicles the 22 issues of Touch and Go, the DIY hardcore punk fanzine. The zine was the precursor to Touch and Go Records.

== Publications ==
- Sound of the Beast: The Complete Headbanging History of Heavy Metal. by Ian Christe. ISBN 978-0-380-81127-4, HarperCollins, 2003.
- Everybody Wants Some: The Van Halen Saga. by Ian Christe. ISBN 978-0-470-03910-6, Wiley & Sons, 2008.
- Born Human: The Life and Music of Death's Chuck Schuldiner. (foreword) ISBN 979-890030924-8, Decibel Books, 2025.
- Metalion: The Slayer Mag Diaries. (foreword) ISBN 978-0979616341, Bazillion Points, 2011.
- Iron Maiden: The Ultimate Unauthorized History of the Beast. (contributor). ISBN 978-0-76034221-3, Voyageur Press, 2012.
- Horror rock: la musica delle tenebre. (foreword) ISBN 97-8-886231136-6, Arcana Musica, 2010.
- AC/DC: High Voltage Rock 'n' Roll: The Ultimate Illustrated History. (contributor) ISBN 978-0-76033832-2, Voyageur Press, 2010.
- Marooned: The Next Generation of Desert Island Discs (chapter on Iron Maiden's Killers). ISBN 0-306-81485-4, Perseus Books, 2007.
- The Trouser Press Guide to 90s Rock. Edited by Ira Robbins, 1997.
- Voter Participation and the States. by Jamie Cooper and Ian Christe, Center for Policy Alternatives, 1992.
