= Experiencing Nirvana: Grunge in Europe, 1989 =

2013 Biography

Nirvana: Grunge in Europe, 1989
- Cover
- Author: Bruce Pavitt
- Language: English
- Genre: Music
- Publisher: Bazillion Points
- Publication date: December 2013
- Publication place: United States
- Pages: 208
- ISBN: 978-1-935950-10-3

Nirvana: Grunge in Europe, 1989 is a 2013 book about Kurt Cobain who was the front-man of American grunge band Nirvana. It was written by Bruce Pavitt who was the co-founder of Sub Pop, Nirvana's original record label. The book features over 200 intimate and unreleased photos that Pavitt took, and documents the eight days in 1989, that he spent on their first European tour with Nirvana and TAD. The book features a foreword by MOJO writer Keith Cameron.

== Release ==
Both prior to the release of the book, and post-release, Pavitt had done press interviews relating to the book for promotion.

== Reception ==
Reception of Experiencing Nirvana was generally positive. Steven Rosen, stated "Pavitt offers up an honest appraisal of the band right before it blew up. For Nirvana fans, this one is a must. For grunge fans in general, Experiencing Nirvana will answer a lot of questions. A terrific document about a band that would, arguably, change the face of music." Frank Valish, in his review of the book stated that "the commentary is more journal than insightful commentary but it does provide a glimpse into the inter-workings of the tour and the dynamic of the time. As documents of a nascent scene go, this one is pretty worthwhile." Harry Guerin also fancied the book in his review for RTÉ and stated "While Experiencing Nirvana also gathers nostalgia-summoning articles from the Melody Makers, NMEs and Sounds of the era, the one thing it's missing is some recollections from the band members themselves."
