= What Are You Doing Here? =

Non-fiction book by Laina Dawes

WHAT ARE YOU DOING HERE? A Black Woman’s Life and Liberation in Heavy Metal
- Author: Laina Dawes
- Language: English
- Genre: Autobiography
- Publisher: Bazillion Points
- Publication date: January 8, 2013
- Publication place: United States
- Media type: print (hardback & paperback)
- Pages: 224
- ISBN: 978-1935950059

WHAT ARE YOU DOING HERE? A Black Woman's Life and Liberation in Heavy Metal is a non-fiction book written by the Canadian journalist Laina Dawes. First published in 2013, the book explores how black women musicians and fans navigate the metal, hardcore, and punk music genres that are regularly thought of as inclusive spaces and centered on a community spirit, but fail to block out the race and gender issues that exist in the outside world. It features a foreword by Skin of Skunk Anansie.
