= Bruce Pavitt =

Record label owner (1959-)

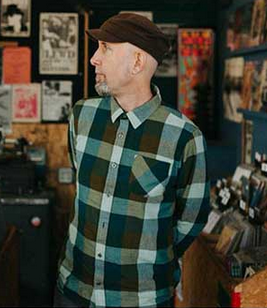
- Pavitt in 2015

Background information
- Born: March 7, 1959 (age 67)
- Origin: Olympia, Washington, U.S.
- Years active: 1980–1996
- Label: Sub Pop

Bruce S. Pavitt (born March 7, 1959) is the co-founder of independent record label Sub Pop and is considered "one of the founding fathers of the Seattle grunge scene." He attended Evergreen State College where he hosted a show on Evergreen's KAOS radio station before founding Sub Pop.

== Career ==
After briefly attending Blackburn College in Carlinville, Illinois Pavitt transferred to The Evergreen State College in Olympia, Washington where, in 1980, he started a fanzine called Subterranean Pop about American independent rock bands. Pavitt wrote:

“We need diverse, regionalized, localized approaches to all forms of art, music, and politics…the most intense music, the most original ideas are coming out of scenes you don’t even know exist. Tomorrow’s pop is being realized today on small decentralized record labels that are interested in taking risks, not making money.”—Subterranean Pop #1, 1980

Three cassette compilations were released through the fanzine. In 1983, Pavitt moved to Seattle and started a record store, Fallout, as well as writing a Sub Pop column for The Rocket, and hosting an independent-label specialty show on KCMU. 1986 saw the release of Sub Pop's (the "-terranean" was dropped earlier from the name) first LP: the Sub Pop 100. Green River's Dry As a Bone EP followed in 1987.

Bruce Pavitt has since written two books: Sub Pop USA and Experiencing Nirvana.

In 2017, he created 8Stem, an app which allows users to delete and add new tracks on existing recordings. Users can add lead vocals, bass, drums, instruments, synthesized vocals, and beats.
