= Polly (Nirvana song) =

1991 song by Nirvana

Song by Nirvana

from the album Nevermind
- Released: September 24, 1991
- Recorded: April 1990
- Studio: Smart Studios (Madison, Wisconsin)
- Genre: Alternative rock
- Length: 2:57
- Label: DGC
- Songwriter: Kurt Cobain (Note: On the original release of Nevermind, the lyrics were credited to Cobain while the music was credited to the whole band. Later releases credit this song solely to Cobain.)
- Producers: Butch Vig; Nirvana

"Polly"
- Promo CD for the MTV Unplugged in New York album

Promotional single by Nirvana

from the album MTV Unplugged in New York
- Released: 1994
- Recorded: November 18, 1993
- Venue: Sony Music Studios in New York City
- Length: 3:16
- Label: DGC Records
- Songwriter: Kurt Cobain
- Producers: Alex Coletti, Scott Litt, Nirvana

Nirvana singles chronology
"About a Girl" (1994)	"Polly" (1994)	"The Man Who Sold the World" (1995)

"Polly" is a song by the American grunge band Nirvana, written by vocalist and guitarist Kurt Cobain. It is the sixth song on their second album, Nevermind, released by DGC Records in September 1991.

The song was written about the abduction, rape, and torture of a 14-year-old girl returning home from a punk rock concert in Tacoma, Washington in 1987. The crime was committed by Gerald Friend. Written from the perspective of the perpetrator, the song demands that the listener confront the perspective of a rapist. Cobain spoke of sexual assault as being one of the "worst crimes on earth," telling one publication in 1991 that "what really needs to be done is teaching men not to rape."

== Early history ==
Originally titled "Cracker", "Polly" dates back to 1987 at the earliest. The earliest known version is a home demo featuring Cobain on vocals and guitar. This version was released on the Nirvana rarities box set, With the Lights Out, in November 2004.

The song was first performed live on June 21, 1989, at The Vogue in Seattle, Washington. It was first recorded in the studio in August 1989 by Steve Fisk at Music Source in Seattle, Washington. The sessions were for a planned EP to coincide with the band's European tour, but only two of the five songs recorded, "Stain" and "Been a Son," were officially released, on the Blew EP later that year.

On October 26, 1989, the band recorded a version during their first BBC Peel Session, at Maida Vale Studios in London, England. The four-song session, engineered by Ted de Bono, was originally broadcast on November 22, 1989.

== Nevermind ==
"Polly" was re-recorded by Butch Vig at Smart Studios in Madison, Wisconsin in April 1990. This acoustic version, featuring Chad Channing on drums, later appeared on the band's major label debut, Nevermind, released in September 1991. It was the only recording from Vig's original session with the band to appear on the album, the rest of which was recorded by Vig in May 1991 at Sound City Studios in Van Nuys, California. It was also the only song on the Nevermind album to feature Channing instead of Dave Grohl as the drummer.

The recording featured Cobain playing a five-string Stella guitar that he said he purchased from a pawn shop for $20. "I didn't bother changing the strings," Cobain told Jeff Gilbert in a 1992 Guitar World interview. "It barely stays in tune. In fact, I had to use duct tape to hold the tuning keys in place." According to Vig, the guitar's "strings were so old they didn't have any tone to them. A real plunky sound." Cobain's guitar and Krist Novoselic's bass were recorded live, after which Cobain recorded lead and harmony vocals, and then Channing added the critical cymbal crashes.

According to Vig in the 2005 Classic Albums: Nirvana - Nevermind documentary, Cobain accidentally sang the first two words of the third verse, "Polly said," too early, during the instrumental break, but the band decided to leave it in. However, earlier versions of the song also feature this line, including the original home demo, the 1989 Peel version, and most pre-Nevermind live versions.

== Post-Nevermind ==
The band recorded another version of the song for the BBC on November 9, 1991, at Maida Vale in London during their appearance on Radio 1's Mark Goodier Radio Session. The session, their last for the BBC, was first broadcast on November 18, 1991, and three of the four songs from the session, including "Polly", appeared on the band's compilation album Incesticide in December 1992. This faster version of the song appeared under the title "(New Wave) Polly."

In December 1992, a live version of the song, recorded at Del Mar Fairgrounds in Del Mar, California on December 28, 1991, was released as a b-side on the fourth single for Nevermind, for the song, "In Bloom".

An acoustic version of "Polly", featuring Pat Smear on second guitar and Lori Goldston on cello, was performed during Nirvana's MTV Unplugged appearance at Sony Music Studios in New York City on November 18, 1993.

The last live performance of "Polly" was at Nirvana's final concert, at Terminal 1 in Munich, Germany, on March 1, 1994.

== Composition and lyrics ==
"Polly"
A sample of "Polly", based a real-life account of the abduction and torture of a 14-year-old girl. Its haunting narrative is written from the point-of-view of the serial rapist. The song is driven by soft, plunking acoustic guitar strums.

=== Music ===
"Polly" is an alternative rock song that lasts for two minutes and 57 seconds. According to the sheet music published at Musicnotes.com by BMG Rights Management, it is written in common time, with a moderate tempo of 122 beats per minute. "Polly" is composed in the key of E minor, while Cobain's vocal range spans one octave and one note, from a low of D3 to a high of E4. The song has a basic sequence of Em–G_{5}–D–C_{5} in the verses and D–C_{5}–G–B♭_{5} during the refrain as its chord progression. The song starts with Cobain playing a soft acoustic guitar riff and singing the vocals until the first chorus when bass enters, a cymbal crash is played, and Cobain adds a vocal harmony. This is done for all verses and choruses. After the second chorus, the guitar stops playing and a bass break starts. The song ends with a final cymbal crash after the third chorus.

=== Lyrics ===
Cobain wrote "Polly" about an incident in Tacoma, Washington involving the abduction and rape of a 14-year-old girl in August 1987. Gerald Arthur Friend kidnapped the girl while she was leaving a rock concert and then suspended her upside down from a pulley in his mobile home and raped and tortured her with a blowtorch. She managed to escape by jumping from his truck at a gas station, attracting attention from surrounding people. Friend was later arrested and convicted for his crimes. Cobain's addition to the story was to have the victim fool the kidnapper into thinking she was enjoying what he was doing to her, causing him to let his guard down long enough for her to escape.

In his Nirvana biography Come as You Are, journalist Michael Azerrad noted that rape seemed to be a consistent theme in Cobain's songs and interviews, as if Cobain was "apologizing for his entire gender." However, Cobain explained, "I don't feel bad about being a man at all. There are all kinds of men that are on the side of the woman and support them and help influence other men. In fact, a man using himself as an example toward other men can probably make more impact than a woman can". In the liner notes to the band's 1992 compilation album Incesticide, Cobain wrote that "last year, a girl was raped by two wastes of sperm and eggs while they sang the lyrics to our song 'Polly'. I have a hard time carrying on knowing there are plankton like that in our audience".

In 2021, Cobain's widow, Courtney Love, discussed the song in a Los Angeles Times interview, saying "you can’t write that song today, from the point of view of the perpetrator. Kurt would definitely not be allowed to sing 'Polly' today, and I think that’s pretty sad".

== Reception ==
"Polly" was ranked number 18 in NME's 2004 "Top 20 Nirvana Songs" list. In 2015, Rolling Stone ranked it number 29 in their ranking of 102 Nirvana songs, with Julianne Sheperd writing, "Though it's certainly not a protest song, it deftly delves into the mind of a sicko, like a succinct Henry: Portrait of a Serial Killer, and is an example of the thoughtful depths Cobain was willing to plumb." In 2019, it was ranked at number 14 in The Guardian's list of "Nirvana's 20 greatest songs". In 2023, the A.V. Club ranked it at number 22 on their list of Nirvana's "30 best songs," with Stephen Thomas Erlewine calling it "a stark counterpoint to the fury of Nevermind" whose "stillness was spookier than the noise that surrounded it."

According to Charles R. Cross's biography Heavier Than Heaven, American singer-songwriter Bob Dylan was impressed with "Polly" upon hearing the song while at a Nirvana concert, remarking of Cobain: "that kid has heart".

"Polly" (Live)
An 18-second sample of "Polly" from the live album From the Muddy Banks of the Wishkah (1996). The song is set at a faster tempo and features distorted electric guitar. Cobain sings his lyrics in a melodic screaming style.

American alternative rock musician Amanda Palmer, who covered "Polly" on the 2011 tribute album, Newermind, discussed the song in a 2011 Spin interview, saying, "It's entirely possible that the production on Nevermind is going to feel dated in 50 years, if it doesn't already. The mystery in the lyrics to a song like 'Polly' is so profound. People will always be trying to make sense of what the fuck exactly Kurt was singing about. That's what makes a song last".

== In popular culture ==
The song appears as downloadable content in the video games Rock Band, Rock Band 2, Rock Band 3 and Rock Band 4.

"Polly" was covered by producer Cain McKnight for the noteworthy charity album, ′Nirvana Reimagined as House and Techno′.

== Live promotional versions ==
=== London Astoria version ===
A live version of "Polly", recorded at the London Astoria on December 3, 1989, was released in Australia as a promotional single in 1996 to promote the live compilation From the Muddy Banks of the Wishkah, released in November 1996.

=== MTV Unplugged version ===
The MTV Unplugged version of "Polly" was released as a promo single in 1994, to promote the album, MTV Unplugged in New York, released in November 1994. The single received moderate airplay on American rock and alternative stations in 1994 and 1995.

Video of the full MTV Unplugged performance was released on the MTV Unplugged in New York DVD in 2007. The DVD also featured footage of the band rehearsing "Polly" during the show's soundcheck as bonus material.

== Certifications ==
Certifications for "Polly"
Region	Certification	Certified units/sales
Australia (ARIA)	Platinum	70,000^{‡}
New Zealand (RMNZ)	Gold	15,000^{‡}
United Kingdom (BPI) Sales since 2004	Silver	200,000^{‡}
United States (RIAA)	Gold	500,000^{‡}
^{‡} Sales+streaming figures based on certification alone.

== Accolades ==
Accolades for "Polly"
Year	Publication	Country	Accolade	Rank
1998	Kerrang!	United Kingdom	20 Great Nirvana Songs Picked by the Stars	7
2023	The A.V. Club	United States	Essential Nirvana: Their 30 greatest songs, ranked	22

== Recording and release history ==
- A live version of the song, recorded at De Doelen in Rotterdam, Netherlands on September 1, 1991, appeared on the live video, 1991: The Year Punk Broke, released in 1992.
- A live version, recorded on October 31, 1991 at the Paramount Theatre in Seattle, appeared on the live video, Live! Tonight! Sold Out!!, released in November 1994. It was re-released as bonus material on the Classic Albums: Nirvana – Nevermind DVD in March 2005, and the full concert was released on DVD and Blu-ray as Live at the Paramount in September 2011.
- A live version, recorded at the Paradiso in Amsterdam, Netherlands on November 25, 1991, was released on CD and Blu-ray on the 30th anniversary "Super Deluxe" version of Nevermind in November 2021.
- Three additional live versions of "Polly" appeared on the 30th anniversary "Super Deluxe" version of Nevermind. In addition to the full Del Mar show, the set included the band's complete shows at The Palace in Melbourne, Australia on February 2, 1992, and the Nakano Sunplaza in Tokyo, Japan on February 19, 1992. In a review of the Nevermind 30th anniversary "Super Deluxe" box set, Rolling Stone stated that at The Palace, Melbourne, Australia show, "When the band plays "Polly" later in the set, Cobain doesn't even need to ask the audience to sing along - it knows what to do".
- A live version, recorded during the band's 1992 Reading Festival appearance in Reading, England on August 30, 1992, appeared on Live at Reading, released on CD and DVD in November 2009.
- Two live versions of "Polly," from the band's concerts at the Great Western Forum in Inglewood, California on December 30, 1993, and at the Seattle Center Arena in Seattle on January 7, 1994, appeared on the 30th anniversary "Super Deluxe" reissue of Nirvana's final studio album, In Utero, released in October 2023.

== Personnel ==
- Kurt Cobain – acoustic guitar, vocals
- Krist Novoselic – bass guitar
- Chad Channing – cymbals
