= Cobain Unseen =

2008 book by Charles R. Cross

- First edition cover
- Author: Charles R. Cross
- Language: English
- Genre: Biography
- Publisher: Little, Brown and Company
- Publication date: October 27, 2008
- Publication place: United States
- Pages: 192
- ISBN: 978-0340977262

Cobain Unseen is a 2008 book about Kurt Cobain who was the front-man of American grunge band Nirvana. It was written by Charles R. Cross. The book features over 200 intimate and unreleased photos from Kurt Cobain's collection of art, journal entries, and other personal artifacts he collected throughout his life. Also included with the book were replica-made reproductions of artwork for such things as Nirvana concerts and stickers. The book also came with a 2-track CD, of which includes audio of Cobain reading a story from one of his journals, entitled "Crybaby Jerkins". The other audio track is an interview with the author, Charles Cross on writing the book.

== Release and reception ==
Upon release, reception for the book was positive. Patrick MacDonald of PopMatters stated that "Cobain Unseen is a deeply personal, tactile, even visceral examination of the late, troubled Seattle rock star Kurt Cobain." Jake Kennedy, of Record Collector magazine stated in his review that "Indeed, where the singer’s own Journals somehow omitted the beauty, Cobain Unseen delivers it in spades, with page after page of insider imagery that leaves the viewer repulsed or fawning."
