= When Nirvana Came to Britain =

2021 BBC documentary by Wise Owl Films

- Directed by: Stuart Ramsay
- Starring: Nirvana
- Music by: Nirvana
- Country of origin: United Kingdom
- Original language: English

Production
- Producer: Mark Robinson for BBC Two
- Running time: 60 minutes
- Production company: Wise Owl films

Original release
- Network: BBC Two
- Release: 18 September 2021

When Nirvana Came to Britain is a 2021 documentary about American rock band Nirvana's time in the United Kingdom from their first tour there in 1989 up to their headline performance at the Reading Festival in 1992 and their cancelled UK tour of 1994. It was produced by Wise Owl Films and first aired on BBC Two on 18 September 2021. It was produced to celebrate the 30th anniversary of the band's Nevermind album, which was released in September 1991.

== Background ==
The film was produced to celebrate the 30th anniversary of the release of Nirvana's Nevermind album in September, 1991 and features interviews with surviving Nirvana band members, drummer Dave Grohl and bassist, Krist Novoselic. Producer Stuart Ramsay interviewed venue owners where the band had played, hotel workers where the band had stayed, van drivers on the band's tours, pub land-lords and dancers, most notably, Antony "Tony" Hodgkinson who danced on stage at many of their UK shows including both of their Reading Festival appearances.

Accounts of the band's time in the UK are given by the British Radio DJ's Jo Whiley and Steve Lamacq, and the Biffy Clyro singer Simon Neil. The documentary also showcases the band's performances on the UK TV shows Top of the Pops and The Word. The documentary explores how Nirvana band leader Kurt Cobain's main musical influences were the English bands Led Zeppelin and the Beatles, but also the lesser known Scottish indie-rock band the Vaselines whose songs Nirvana covered, and the British band the Raincoats.

== See also ==
- Classic Albums: Nirvana – Nevermind, 2005 documentary on the making of the Nevermind album.
- The Last 48 Hours of Kurt Cobain, 2006 BBC documentary.
