= The Last 48 Hours of Kurt Cobain =

- Directed by: John Dower
- Written by: John Dower
- Produced by: BBC
- Starring: Kurt Cobain
- Release date: 2006
- Running time: 80 minutes
- Country: United Kingdom
- Language: English

The Last 48 Hours of Kurt Cobain is a 2006 BBC documentary about the last hours of the life of Kurt Cobain who was the front man of American grunge band Nirvana.

== Premise ==
The documentary details the last 48 hours of the life of Nirvana front man Kurt Cobain leading up to his death in April 1994, including details such as how he used to frequent the Aurora Avenue in Seattle to use drugs. The documentary was directed by John Dower whose works also included the boxing documentary Thrilla in Manila, and Live Forever: The Rise and Fall of Brit Pop. The Last 48 Hours of Kurt Cobain includes interviews with stars such as Guns N' Roses bassist Duff McKagan, who coincidentally sat next to Cobain on a flight back to Seattle shortly before he committed suicide. The documentary also features interviews with Charles R. Cross who wrote the Cobain biography Heavier Than Heaven, Cobain's grandfather Leland Cobain, Sub Pop photographer Charles Peterson, Chad Channing who was Nirvana's drummer before being replaced by Dave Grohl, producer Jack Endino, and Melody Maker journalist Everett True.

The last 48 hours of Cobain's life was subsequently not detailed in his official 2015 HBO documentary, Kurt Cobain: Montage of Heck.

== Reception ==
In 2015, The Hairpin ranked The Last 48 Hours of Kurt Cobain sixth in their A Definitive Ranking of Every Kurt Cobain Movie Ever Made. In a 2014 review, Open Culture stated that "Much more than its title suggests, the hour and twenty minute doc works well as a biography of Cobain and a brief history of Nirvana and the Seattle scene that birthed them".

== See also ==
- Kurt Cobain: Moments That Shook Music, BBC documentary from 2024.
