= Kurt Cobain: Moments That Shook Music =

- Directed by: John Osborne
- Starring: Kurt Cobain
- Music by: Nirvana
- Country of origin: United Kingdom
- Original language: English

Production
- Producer: Touchdown Films
- Running time: 45 minutes

Original release
- Release: 13 April 2024

Kurt Cobain: Moments That Shook Music is a BBC documentary that first aired on April 13, 2024, in the United Kingdom to mark the 30th anniversary of the death of Kurt Cobain who was the lead singer and guitarist of American rock band Nirvana.

== Synopsis ==
The documentary first aired on BBC Two and BBC iPlayer on April 13, 2024, to mark the 30th anniversary of the death of the Nirvana lead singer and guitarist who committed suicide in April 1994. It was directed and written by John Osborne. The aim of the documentary was to demystify the death of Cobain using archive footage. A press release stated that the documentary will be "told exclusively through powerful and rare archive footage", delivering a "visceral account of the days that surrounded the tragic moment" when Kurt Cobain took his own life. Some of the archive footage had never been seen before on British TV. The only Nirvana music to feature in the film are cover versions of songs written by other people. There is a mention of how Nirvana's Nevermind album knocked Michael Jackson's Dangerous off the number 1 spot on the Billboard 200 album chart. It is also mentioned that the day after Cobain's body was found president Bill Clinton asked Pearl Jam's Eddie Vedder if he should address the nation on it but that Vedder advised against it. There is an interview with the electrician who found Cobain's body on the morning of April 8, 1994. The documentary includes footage of Cobain's wife, Courtney Love, reading his final letter that was played to a crowd at his vigil in Seattle and also an interview with Cobain himself. The documentary ends with the legacy of the band finally being acknowledged but in sales, chart positions and awards.

== Reception ==
The Guardian rated the documentary three out of five stars, with Rebecca Nicholson stating that "But other than that interview, Cobain is largely absent: the moment that shook music, for this film, is not his life and work, but his death. Fair enough, I suppose, if that is the brief". Robscene.com rated it 6.5 out of 10 and said that "By focusing solely on Kurt's tragic suicide in April of 1994, this new BBC documentary does at least offer a fresh spin on the usual rags to riches to grave narrative that dominates most of the others..." and that "Kurt Cobain: Moments That Shook Music offers a brief and fairly shallow document of Nirvana's rise to fame before settling in for a detailed description of Cobain's last days and the aftermath of his death".

== See also ==
- The Last 48 Hours of Kurt Cobain, BBC documentary from 2006.
- When Nirvana Came to Britain, BBC documentary from 2021.
