= Room Full of Mirrors =

2005 biography of the influential rock guitarist, singer, and songwriter Jimi Hendrix

Room Full of Mirrors: A Biography of Jimi Hendrix
- First edition
- Author: Charles R. Cross
- Language: English
- Genre: Biography
- Publisher: Sceptre
- Publication date: August 15, 2005
- Publication place: United States
- Pages: 384
- ISBN: 0-340-82683-5
- Preceded by: Heavier Than Heaven - A Biography Of Kurt Cobain

Room Full of Mirrors: A Biography of Jimi Hendrix is a 2005 biography of the influential rock guitarist, singer, and songwriter Jimi Hendrix. It was written by Charles R. Cross. The name comes from the title of a Hendrix composition.

Released on the eve of the 35th anniversary of Hendrix's death, Room Full of Mirrors is composed of many interviews that Cross conducted. More than half of the people interviewed had never spoken about Jimi since his death.

== Contents ==
Cross describes Hendrix's childhood in poverty and deprivation in Seattle, as well as when he was first drawn to music. He provides details about Hendrix's exploitation of women, and his discharge from the military after lying about his sexuality. He includes passages of letters Jimi wrote to his father Al, before and after becoming famous.

== Reception ==
A review in Library Journal suggested that Room Full of Mirrors was "the definitive take on Hendrix", "tackling Hendrix with authority and objectivity to spin a tale that's as compelling as it is illuminating".

Meanwhile, Kirkus Reviews was far more critical, concluding that "Hendrix's story is finally lost in a purple haze". The review pointed out that the book failed to thoroughly examine Hendrix's life in the mid-1960s, including his apprenticeship on the Chitlin' Circuit in the South; his artistic development while in Greenwich Village; his "prodigious mastery of the studio"; and the contradiction that he found commercial success as a black musician popular with white audiences. The review also suggested that the section covering Hendrix's arrival and popularity in London "reads like a twice-told tale".
