= Jim Berkenstadt =

American writer, record producer, and historical entertainment consultant

James Allan Berkenstadt (born June 26, 1956) is an American writer, record producer, and historical entertainment consultant.

Berkenstadt, previously an attorney of many years, has consulted on a number of audio, video, and online projects for George Harrison, as well as for The Beatles' company Apple Corps and many others in the music industry.

== Early life and education ==
Berkenstadt was born in Winnetka, Illinois, a suburb of Chicago. He is the third of three children born to Lois and Edward Berkenstadt.

After graduating from Northwestern University with a Bachelor of Arts, Berkenstadt went on to get his J.D. degree from Southern Illinois University. He passed the Illinois State Bar Examination in 1982 and the Wisconsin State Bar in 1985.

== Career ==
In the 1980s, Berkenstadt was a litigation attorney in Chicago at Pollina & Phelan and then, after moving to Madison, Wisconsin, he continued practicing at the Axley Brynelson law firm. From 1987 to 2007, Berkenstadt served as Vice President & General Counsel at The Wisconsin Cheeseman, a gift and food manufacturing company in Sun Prairie, Wisconsin.

In the early 1990s, Berkenstadt began publishing articles specializing in The Beatles' history and other rock and roll-related material, for magazines such as Goldmine, Musician, and ICE.

In 1994, Berkenstadt and co-author Belmo penned the book Black Market Beatles: The Story Behind Their Lost Recordings, aimed at fans interested in the recordings that the Beatles left in the vaults. Black Market Beatles is a part of the permanent Library and Archive Collection at the Rock and Roll Hall of Fame and Museum in Cleveland.

In September 1998, Berkenstadt and Charles Cross co-authored the book Nevermind Nirvana about the creation of the Nevermind album by Nirvana. It served to create an understanding of how the album was so well received by the 90s generation of fans. Nevermind Nirvana is also a part of the permanent Library and Archive Collection at the Rock and Roll Hall of Fame.

From 1998 to 2000, Berkenstadt produced two historical live albums of Big Band music that had been performed and recorded live on the rooftop of Madison's historic Edgewater Hotel. The albums, Live at the Edgewater Jimmy Dorsey and Woody Herman, and Live at the Edgewater: Tex Beneke, Stan Kenton & Ralph Flanagan, were released on the Soundworks Label. Berkenstadt has also received an RIAA Platinum record award for his work with Garbage (band) on their album Version 2.0.

Since the late 1990s, Berkenstadt has worked on a number of projects for George Harrison, including the Martin Scorsese documentary film, George Harrison: Living in the Material World, which won two Emmy Awards. He also contributed to the Beatles' Help! DVD box set, as well as VH1's Behind the Music.

In 2013, Berkenstadt published the Amazon Best Seller, The Beatle Who Vanished, "a true account of Jimmie Nicol, an anonymous drummer whose journey from humble beginnings to an improbable climb rescued The Beatles' first world tour from disaster by temporarily stepping in for Ringo Starr." The Beatle Who Vanished is a part of the permanent Library and Archive Collection at the Rock and Roll Hall of Fame.

From 2014 to 2016, Berkenstadt co-starred on two Reelz Network TV Series: Celebrity Legacies and Celebrity Damage Control as a Rock and Roll expert.

Berkenstadt recently contributed historical research to two new prominent Beatles books in 2016: All You Need Is Love - The Beatles by Paul Skellett and Birth of an Icon: Revolver 50 by Klaus Voormann.

In 2016, Berkenstadt served as historical consultant on the documentary The Smart Studios Story, which debuted at the SXSW festival. The documentary tells the history of Producers Butch Vig and Steve Marker, describing how their unique sound shaped albums by Nirvana, The Smashing Pumpkins, Garbage, and Sonic Youth.

Additionally, Berkenstadt provided historical research to The Beatles' new documentary, The Beatles: Eight Days A Week, directed by Ron Howard.

In 2017, Roy Orbison's son Alex Orbison and Ashley Hamilton secured the TV and Film rights to Berkenstadt's book, The Beatle Who Vanished. Berkenstadt will serve as both script consultant and co-executive producer on the film, which is currently in development.

During the COVID-19 pandemic lockdown year of 2020, Berkenstadt co-starred in the TV comedy series, Saving Bernie, about an attempt to kidnap Bernie Sanders during the past presidential campaign.

In 2021, Berkenstadt was credited in the 2021 Disney+ documentary, The Beatles: Get Back, for his audio research work.

In 2022, Berkenstadt released his next book entitled, Mysteries in the Music: Case Closed. The book examines the secrets, myths, legends, hoaxes, conspiracies, and the wildly inexplicable events that are such an intriguing part of rock and roll history. The book, which features a Foreword by Grammy Awards music producer Butch Vig (Nirvana (band), Paul McCartney, Foo Fighters, Garbage (band), Green Day), is already an Amazon Bestseller.

== Discography ==
- Live at the Edgewater: Jimmy Dorsey & Woody Herman (Producer) (1998)
- Version 2.0 by Garbage (Research and Website development) (1998)
- Live at the Edgewater: Tex Beneke, Stan Kenton & Ralph Flanagan (Producer) (1998)
- The Dark Horse Years 1976–1992 box set (CD + DVD research) (2004)
- Live in Japan by George Harrison (Hybrid SACD research) (2004)
- Cloud Nine by George Harrison (Research) (2004)
- Living in the Material World by George Harrison (CD + DVD research) (2006)
- Eye to Eye by Bandallamas (Co-executive producer) (2010)

== Books ==
- Black Market Beatles: The Story Behind Their Lost Recordings
- Classic Rock Albums: Nirvana – Nevermind
- The Beatle Who Vanished
- Mysteries in the Music: Case Closed

== Filmography ==
- Citizen Hong Kong (Research) (1999)
- George Harrison: The Dark Horse Years 1976–1992 (Research) (2004)
- The True History of the Traveling Wilburys (Research) (2007)
- The Beatles in Help! (Research) (2007)
- All Together Now {Research} {2008}
- George Harrison: Living in the Material World (Historical Consultant) (2011)
- The Smart Studios Story {Historical Consultant} {2016}
- The Beatles: Eight Days a Week (Researcher) (2016)
- John's Guitar (Research and Consultant) (2016)
- The Beatles: Get Back (Research) (2021)

== Television ==
- American Bandstand's Teen Idol (Clip researcher) (1994)
- VH1 Behind the Music: Badfinger (Researcher) (2000)
- VH1 Behind the Music: Garbage (Researcher) (2002)
- The Artie Lange Show (Himself - Guest) (2012)
- Celebrity Damage Control (Himself - Expert) (2014)
- Celebrity Legacies (Himself - Expert) (2014-2016)

== Actor ==
- When I Sing (Self) (2018)
- Saving Bernie (DC 10 Jet Pilot / Sea Plane Pilot) (2020)
