= Monk Magazine =

American travel magazine

- Staff writers: James Crotty; Michael Lane
- Publisher: James Crotty; Michael Lane
- Founded: 1986
- Final issue: 2000
- Country: United States
- Language: English
- ISSN: 0899-6059
- OCLC: 18183102

Monk: The Mobile Magazine was a travel magazine published from 1986 to 2000 by James Crotty and Michael Lane, aka the Monks. The magazine began publication as a newsletter when Crotty and Lane left San Francisco to travel across the United States by RV. They published a glossy magazine to document their travels, a publication that became a cult hit. In their travels the Monks interviewed numerous off-beat and counterculture figures such as Annie Sprinkle, Quentin Crisp, Kurt Cobain, Dan Savage and Gus Van Sant and offered tips on what unusual sights one should see when traveling.

In 1993, they published a book, Mad Monks on the Road/a 47,000-Hour Dashboard Adventure-From Paradise, California, to Royal, Arkansas, and Up the New Jersey Turnpike (Simon and Schuster) reprinting a number of their interviews and adventures.

In 1995 Lane authored Pink Highways(Carol Publishing) and in 1997 Crotty authored How to Talk American (Houghton Mifflin).

The magazine has been replaced by a website, monk.com and a series of Monk travel guides that include Mad Monks Guide to New York City (Macmillan) and Mad Monks Guide to California (Macmillan).

== Issues ==
- Episode 1: The Road
- Episode 2: Down the Coast
- Episode 3: Southern California
- Episode 4: Sedona
- Episode 5: Colorado
- Episode 6: Texas
- Episode 7: Santa Fe
- Episode 8: The Ozarks
- Episode 9: New York
- Episode 10: Midlife Crisis
- Episode 11: Florida
- Episode 12: Maine
- Episode 13: Boston
- Episode 14: Seattle
- Episode 15: Los Angeles
- Episode 16: San Francisco
- Episode 17: Portland
- Episode 18: Nevada
- Episode 19: New York 2
