= All Apologies: Kurt Cobain 10 Years On =

2006 documentary about Kurt Cobain

- Directed by: Jon Brewer
- Starring: Kurt Cobain
- Country of origin: United Kingdom
- Original language: English

Production
- Producer: Jon Brewer
- Running time: 59 mins

Original release
- Release: 2006

All Apologies: Kurt Cobain 10 Years On is a 2006 documentary about Kurt Cobain who was the lead singer and guitarist of American rock band Nirvana. The documentary takes its name from the Nirvana song "All Apologies".

== Synopsis ==
The film documents the downward spiral and isolation of Nirvana band leader Kurt Cobain and his death in April, 1994. It features interviews with Kurt Cobain and Nirvana band members Chad Channing, Krist Novoselic, Dave Grohl, British journalists Terry Christian, Steve Sutherland (NME) and Keith Cameron (Mojo and Q), American journalist David Fricke, producer Jack Endino, Steve Diggle of Buzzcocks who toured with Nirvana in 1993-94, Cobain's former girl-friend Tracy Marander and his grandfather Leland Cobain. It was directed by Jon Brewer.

== Reception ==
The documentary was watched by an audience of 30,000 when it debuted on Sky Arts in 2012. A review by Impulse Gamer stated, "The quality of the release is varying, being taken from multiple sources and the attitude toward Nirvana, which differs from adulation through to anger at the death of Kurt and the general thoughts about the band".

== Related ==
All Apologies: Kurt Cobain 10 Years On is not to be confused with the similarly named documentary Kurt Cobain: 10 Years Later which was filmed by MTV Europe in 2004 but did not air because of copyrights of Nirvana's music that featured in it.

== Charts ==
Chart (2008)	Peak position
UK Music Videos (OCC)	41
