= Gerald Friend =

American rapist and kidnapper

Gerald Arthur Friend (born November 24, 1937) is an American rapist and kidnapper from Lakewood, Washington, currently serving two consecutive 75-year terms at Airway Heights Corrections Center.

Friend was originally jailed for kidnapping 12-year-old Candace Compton from Sumner, Washington, in July 1960, when he was 22. He picked up the hitchhiking girl and her brother, but forced the boy from the car at gunpoint. He then drove Compton to Mount Rainier National Park where he beat her, raped her, burned her with cigarettes, and cut her hair. The girl eventually escaped by jumping into a river, where she was discovered by a passing motorist. Several days later, Friend's father found him hiding in a field near their home; Friend drew a .22 pistol and was wounded in the ensuing struggle. His father took him to the hospital and turned him in to the police. Friend was initially charged with first degree kidnapping, then a capital offense in Washington even if the victim did not die, but later pleaded guilty to second degree kidnapping and first degree rape. He was sentenced to a minimum of 75 years in prison. At the time, one judge remarked, "If one-tenth of what the newspaper says is true, he should be horse-whipped every day for the rest of his life."

After serving 20 years at Walla Walla, and escaping twice, he was paroled in 1980.

In June 1987, he abducted a 14-year-old girl at knife-point when she accepted a ride after a rock concert. He repeatedly raped and tortured her while she was tied to a pulley suspended from the ceiling of his mobile home. The girl escaped by jumping from his truck at a gas station. Friend was stopped a day later for a traffic violation, and arrested when the deputies recognized him. He was convicted of first-degree kidnapping and rape that August. He was ordered to serve the remainder of his 1960 sentence, in addition to a second 75-year sentence. The following year, his second victim sued the state and the Department of Corrections for prematurely paroling Friend in 1980.

Police in King County suspected Friend in the Green River Killer case, and considered him a suspect in the murder of two girls in Tacoma in 1987. However, police were unable to uncover a connection to those crimes, and the Green River Killer was later confirmed to be Gary Ridgway.

The 1987 kidnapping of the 14-year-old victim was the inspiration for the Nirvana song "Polly", released in 1991. Songwriter Kurt Cobain had read about the incident in a newspaper.
