= Backstreets Magazine =

US magazine

Backstreets Magazine is a published quarterly Bruce Springsteen fanzine that has been covering the music of Springsteen and other Jersey Shore sound artists since 1980. On February 3, 2023, the magazine's publisher and editor-in-chief announced that the magazine will cease publication after one final upcoming issue and will stop updating its website.

== History ==
On October 24, 1980, Bruce Springsteen performed at the Seattle Coliseum in Seattle, Washington, during The River Tour. That night Charles R. Cross passed out 10,000 copies of a free four-page tabloid about Springsteen that he had created. That first issue mostly ended up discarded, with many copies floating in puddles by night's end. Those did survive have become valuable collector's items, sometimes fetching hundreds of dollars for a copy.

After that modest beginning, Backstreets Magazine began an uninterrupted run of publishing. Along the way the magazine won a Music Journalism Award winner for Best Fanzine, and grew from its newsprint roots to a slick magazine format with issue number 10. Full color covers followed soon thereafter, and eventually Backstreets became a typical full-color published magazine.

Christopher Phillips is the publisher and editor of Backstreets. He moved to Seattle in 1993, and began working with Cross starting with issue number 44. By 1994 Phillips was managing editor, and he launched the companion website in 1995. In 1998 Phillips took over the magazine completely. He stayed in Seattle until 2000, and then moved operations to the East Coast. Phillips and Backstreets both reside in Chapel Hill, North Carolina.

== Website ==
Backstreets.com grew into a major source of information for the Springsteen fan community. The website provided news, show schedules and reviews, ticket sales information, online store, and news about E Street Band members and Jersey Shore artists.

The site also includes BTX, an Internet forum which presents a number of message boards for discussion of everything about Springsteen, as well as to buy, resell, and trade tickets to Springsteen's shows. BTX became the dominant Springsteen fan discussion forum in the U.S., supplanting prior vehicles such as the Usenet group rec.music.artists.springsteen, the "Luckytown" electronic mailing list, and the pre-Internet, telephone-based "Bruce party line".

The website was successful enough that, as the decade of the 2000s progressed, the "quarterly" issues of the printed magazine came out far less frequently, causing some sporadic dissatisfaction among subscribers.
