= Jon Brewer =

English film director

- Born: 30 January 1950 (age 76); Eastbourne
- Education: Sutton Valence School for Boys
- Occupations: Documentary Director, Producer

Jonathan George Brewer (born 30 January 1950) is an English documentary director and producer who was formerly a manager of rock music acts and artists.

== Early life ==
Brewer was born in Eastbourne, England to Gansel and Eileen Brewer. They later moved to London where he was educated at Sutton Valence School for Boys. His father worked with Lloyd's of London as an insurance broker and his mother was a housewife who raised Jon and his siblings, David, Elizabeth, and Victoria. Jon followed his father into the insurance industry at Lloyds, but was soon drawn towards the music industry.

== Early career ==
Soon after beginning his career in music management, Brewer joined forces with artists such as David Bowie, Gene Clark of The Byrds, and Mick Taylor and Bill Wyman of The Rolling Stones, as well as Alvin Lee and 10 Years After. In 1978 he collected two Ivor Novello Awards on behalf of his company, Belfern Music. He was awarded the Ivor Novello Award for producing and publishing Gerry Rafferty's "Baker Street" Best Pop Song and another for Best Song Musically and Lyrically. Brewer was also involved in the re-formation of the band Yes with Chris Squire, Jon Anderson, Steve Howe, Alan White and Rick Wakeman – the group being well known for their acrimonious relationships with each other. They went on to record the Keys To Ascension project with Brewer managing.

In the early 1980s, Brewer entered the burgeoning video industry, creating the 4th largest independent production company in the UK, Avatar Film Company. The company formed associations with CBS, Fox, EMI, and Universal, CIC and branched out into Europe, Australasia, Japan and through Universal Pictures in America, allowing Brewer to become a producer of feature films.

In 2000, Brewer was responsible for bringing the Fuji Rock Festival to the BBC. A 69-camera shoot, filmed at the base of Mount Fuji in Japan with artists such as Oasis, Eminem, Alanis Morissette and Neil Young, amongst others. He subsequently produced a Dance Music DVD in association with Ministry of Sound, entitled The Annual in 2002. This DVD incorporated 5.1 Surround Sound and psychedelic graphic visual effects for an audio/visual home experience. Brewer employed a similar approach in his production of Cream: the DVD.

== Production and directing ==
Brewer first produced a documentary–style program for television in 2003 with the production of Michael Hutchence – The Loved One. Soon after, he produced and directed a feature documentary for television on the Nirvana front-man, Kurt Cobain. The film experienced wide success in television worldwide as well as in Home Entertainment, especially in America, England, France, and Japan. The Classic Artists Series, followed with eight episodes, beginning with the band Cream, and later chronicling the careers of the Moody Blues, Yes, Jethro Tull, Jimi Hendrix, Jim Morrison, and Bad Company (which also featured in CLASSIC ROCK magazine as a special edit). The Classic Artists Series was released on TV and DVD worldwide.

The opportunity to produce and direct the biopic of B. B. King followed in 2012, B.B. King: The Life of Riley ('Riley' being King's real first name), with contributions from Bono, Eric Clapton, Carlos Santana, Bruce Willis, Ringo Starr, and many others, with narration by Morgan Freeman.

Following the worldwide success of B.B. King: The Life of Riley and his deepening alliances in America's South, Brewer with his wife, writer and executive producer Laura Rojko, chronicled in depth the development of blues music over 300 years of music as expressionism through slavery, abolition of slavery and the Civil Rights Movement, taking music right into early Rock N Roll in the 3-part miniseries seen on Sky Television and Amazon Prime, Monochrome: Black, White and Blue. Following the positive reception of B.B. King: The Life of Riley, Brewer was contacted by the Nat King Cole estate to create a documentary feature on the life of Nat King Cole. In 2014, the documentary film Nat King Cole: Afraid of the Dark finished filming and post-production. The film premiered in London on 13 May 2014, and has continued to be broadcast worldwide, winning the 2015 Screen Nation 'Diversity in Factual Programming Award' sponsored by BBC and ITV.

At the funeral of B. B. King in 2015, while Brewer was filming, a number of previous band members of King expressed their frustration that King's life on the road had not been featured in B.B. King: The Life of Riley. Upon further introspection, Brewer realized that there had been such a great deal of King's life of 55 years on the road, for over 300 days per year. Something had to be done to complete the story; thus commenced the production of B.B. King: On the Road, where musicians from several stages of King's career sat on the B. B. King Tour Bus across America's Deep South, telling some amazing stories that could only happen 'on the road', including a bombing meant for Martin Luther King, a fatal bus accident, and also many hilarious incidents. The resulting second B. B. King documentary was seen on Hulu in America and Sky TV in the UK, plus other broadcasters worldwide, as well as via Universal Music on DVD and Digital.

The BBC entered into a deal with Brewer to direct and co-produce a documentary on Guns N' Roses, The Most Dangerous Band in The World, which aired on BBC in January 2016.

The Mick Ronson story had been brought to the Brewer's production companies, Cardinal Releasing Ltd and Emperor Media, and soon production was underway on Beside Bowie: The Mick Ronson Story, and premiered in London May 8, 2017 to rave reviews.

At a later date, Brewer directed the authorized Chuck Berry documentary, and his company was in the process of developing a feature film Biopic dramatized production.

== Blues documentaries ==
Brewer was later commissioned to direct the film covering the life story of B. B. King. The film became B.B. King: The Life of Riley (Riley being King's real first name) and was narrated by Morgan Freeman.

Following his experience on B.B. King: The Life of Riley, Brewer began to develop a 3 part series for television, chronicling the development of blues music through slavery, abolition of slavery and the Civil Rights Movement, Monochrome: Black, White and Blue.

Following the positive reception of B.B. King: The Life of Riley, Brewer was contacted by the Nat King Cole estate to create a documentary feature on the life of Nat King Cole. In 2014 the documentary film Nat King Cole: Afraid of the Dark finished filming and edit. The film premiered in London on 13 May 2014.

== Filmography ==
Title	Year	Role
Screwball Hotel	1988	Producer
Curse of the Crystal Eye	1991	Producer
Michael Hutchence: The Loved One	2005	Producer
All Apologies: Kurt Cobain 10 Years On	2005	Director, Producer
Classic Artists: Cream	2005	Director, Producer
Classic Artists: The Moody Blues	2005	Director, Producer
Classic Artists: Yes	2006	Director, Producer
Classic Artists: Jethro Tull	2007	Director, Producer
Jimi Hendrix: Guitar Hero	2011	Director, Producer
Legends of the Canyon	2013	Director, Producer
Bad Company: The Official Authorised 40th Anniversary Documentary	2014	Director, Producer
Rock Poet	2014	Director, Producer
B.B. King: The Life of Riley	2014	Director, Producer
Nat King Cole: Afraid of the Dark	2014	Director, Producer
Alice and The Most Dangerous Band in The World	2016	Director, Producer
Steve McQueen: Desert Racer	2017	Director, Producer
Monochrome: Black, White and Blue	2017	Director, Producer
Beside Bowie: The Mick Ronson Story	2017	Director, Producer
B.B. King: On the Road	2018	Director, Producer

CHUCK

2019 BEYOND THE DECKS Co Director and Co Producer 2025
