= Wisconsin Cheeseman =

Food gift company

Coordinates: 42°35′58.4″N 89°38′58″W

- Company type: Subsidiary
- Founded: 1946; 79 years ago
- Headquarters: Sun Prairie, Wisconsin, United States
- Parent: Colony Brands
- Website: wisconsincheeseman.com

The Wisconsin Cheeseman is a privately held mail-order food gift company operating in Monroe, Wisconsin. Established in 1946, the company publishes several catalogs and emails each year to promote its line of over 300 products, consisting of Wisconsin cheese, sausage, chocolates, fruitcakes, petits fours, cakes, cookies, fresh fruits, nuts, breads and other assorted food gifts.

== History ==
The Wisconsin Cheeseman was owned and operated for 60 years by the founding family, the Cremers. It was composed of three divisions: the Wisconsin Cheeseman, Mille Lacs Gourmet Foods, and Scott's Fundraising Resource. The company employed 170 workers and recorded $36.4 million in sales in 2006. In 2007 the Wisconsin Cheeseman was purchased by a group of private investors, the Wisconsin Food Gift Company. That company went into receivership in February 2011 and its assets were auctioned off. The Wisconsin Cheeseman was purchased by Colony Brands, the parent company of Swiss Colony. Mille Lacs Gourmet Foods was acquired by Steve's Wholesale Dairy Company of Sun Prairie.
