= Heavier Than Heaven =

2001 biography by Charles R. Cross

- First edition
- Author: Charles R. Cross
- Language: English
- Genre: Biography
- Publisher: Hyperion
- Publication date: August 15, 2001
- Publication place: United States
- Pages: 381
- ISBN: 0-7868-6505-9
- Followed by: Room Full Of Mirrors - A Biography Of Jimi Hendrix

Heavier Than Heaven is a 2001 biography of musician Kurt Cobain, the frontman of the grunge band Nirvana. It was written by Charles R. Cross.

For the book, Cross desired to create the definitive Cobain biography, and over four years conducted 400+ interviews; in particular, he was granted exclusive interviews and access to Cobain's private journals, lyrics and photos, by his widow Courtney Love. Notably, neither Nirvana drummer Dave Grohl nor Cobain's mother contributed to the book.

Cross took the name "Heavier Than Heaven" from a tour Nirvana did with the band Tad in the United Kingdom. The lead singer, Tad Doyle, was very obese; the name, which was thought up by the tour promoters, was meant in part to poke fun at the inaccurate idea that Tad alone weighed more than all of the members of Nirvana put together.

== Reception ==
While arguably the most complete Cobain biography, Cross opted to include his own impression of what Cobain's final days were like. Several people questioned the inclusion of fiction in what was claimed to be a non-fiction book. At the same time, Cross' desire for the book to be as complete as possible meant that he occasionally accepted secondhand (and incorrect) information as fact. The book was criticized as being a collaboration between Love and Cross by friends. Cross also did not interview Nirvana drummer Dave Grohl. However, beyond the criticism, the book contained many details about Cobain and Nirvana's career that had otherwise gone unnoted.

== Proposed film version ==
David Benioff was hired by Universal Pictures in October 2007 to write a screenplay based on the Charles R. Cross biography. Courtney Love was to serve as executive producer, with Marc Forster showing interest in directing. However, in March 2009, Forster said that he was not going to direct the film but expressed hopes that it would be done well. In 2014, it was reported that the film was still going ahead. However, as of 2025, there is no news on whether or not the movie will be released.
