= Charles R. Cross =

American music journalist (1957–2024)

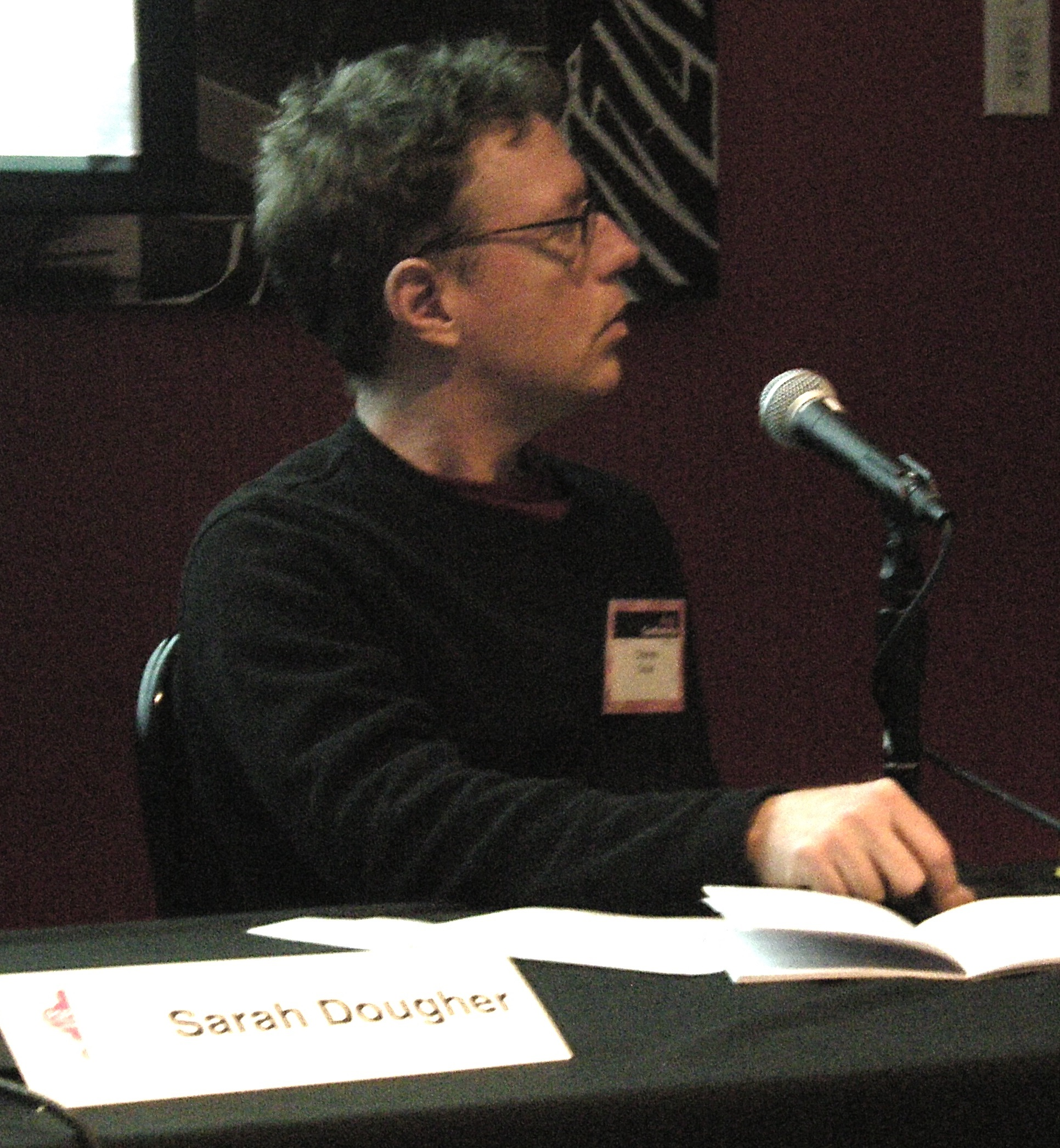
- Cross in 2009
- Born: Charles Richard Cross; May 7, 1957 Richmond, Virginia, U.S.
- Died: August 9, 2024 (aged 67) Shoreline, Washington, U.S.
- Occupation: Author; journalist; biographer; music critic
- Education: University of Washington; Parsons School of Design
- Period: 1987–2024
- Notable works: Heavier than Heaven: A Biography of Kurt Cobain; Room Full of Mirrors: A Biography of Jimi Hendrix

Charles Richard Cross (May 7, 1957 – August 9, 2024) was an American music journalist, author and editor who was based in Seattle. He documented the Seattle music scene as the editor of The Rocket in Seattle from 1986–2000.

== Career ==
Cross wrote three New York Times bestselllers, including the award-winning 2001 biography of Kurt Cobain, Heavier Than Heaven, and Room Full of Mirrors: A Biography of Jimi Hendrix, which Vibe described as "one of the greatest-ever books on music". In addition to writing the 1989 Bruce Springsteen biography, Backstreets: Springsteen, the Man and His Music, he founded Backstreets Magazine, a periodical for Springsteen fans.

In 2004, while conducting research for the Hendrix biography, Cross discovered the gravesite of Jimi Hendrix's mother, Lucille Jeter Hendrix, in an abandoned section of Greenwood Memorial Park, where Jimi Hendrix was buried. Her gravesite was lost because the standard welfare marker of her day, an inscribed brick, was buried in decades of mud.

== Death ==
Cross died at his home in Shoreline, Washington, on August 9, 2024, at the age of 67.

== Books ==
- 1989 Backstreets: Springsteen, the Man and His Music, Harmony Books, New York 1989/1992. ISBN 0-517-58929-X.
- 1991 Led Zeppelin: Heaven and Hell, Harmony, 1991. ISBN 978-0-517-58308-1.
- 1998 Classic Rock Albums: Nevermind: Nirvana, Music Sales Group, 1998/2003. ISBN 978-0-8256-7286-6. Coauthored with Jim Berkenstadt
- 2001 Heavier Than Heaven: A Biography of Kurt Cobain, Hyperion, 2001. ISBN 0-7868-8402-9.
- 2005 Room Full of Mirrors: A Biography of Jimi Hendrix, Sceptre, 2005. ISBN 0-340-82683-5.
- 2008 Cobain Unseen, Little, Brown and Company, 2008. ISBN 978-0-316-03372-5
- 2009 Led Zeppelin: Shadows Taller Than Our Souls, It Books. ISBN 978-0061809149
- 2012 Kicking & Dreaming: A Story of Heart, Soul, and Rock & Roll, HarperCollins, New York, 2012. ISBN 978-0-06-210167-9. Coauthored with Ann and Nancy Wilson
- 2014 Here We Are Now: The Lasting Impact of Kurt Cobain ISBN 978-1483002910
