= Suicide of Kurt Cobain =

1994 suicide of Nirvana singer and guitarist

Coordinates: 47°37′10.4″N 122°16′56.7″W

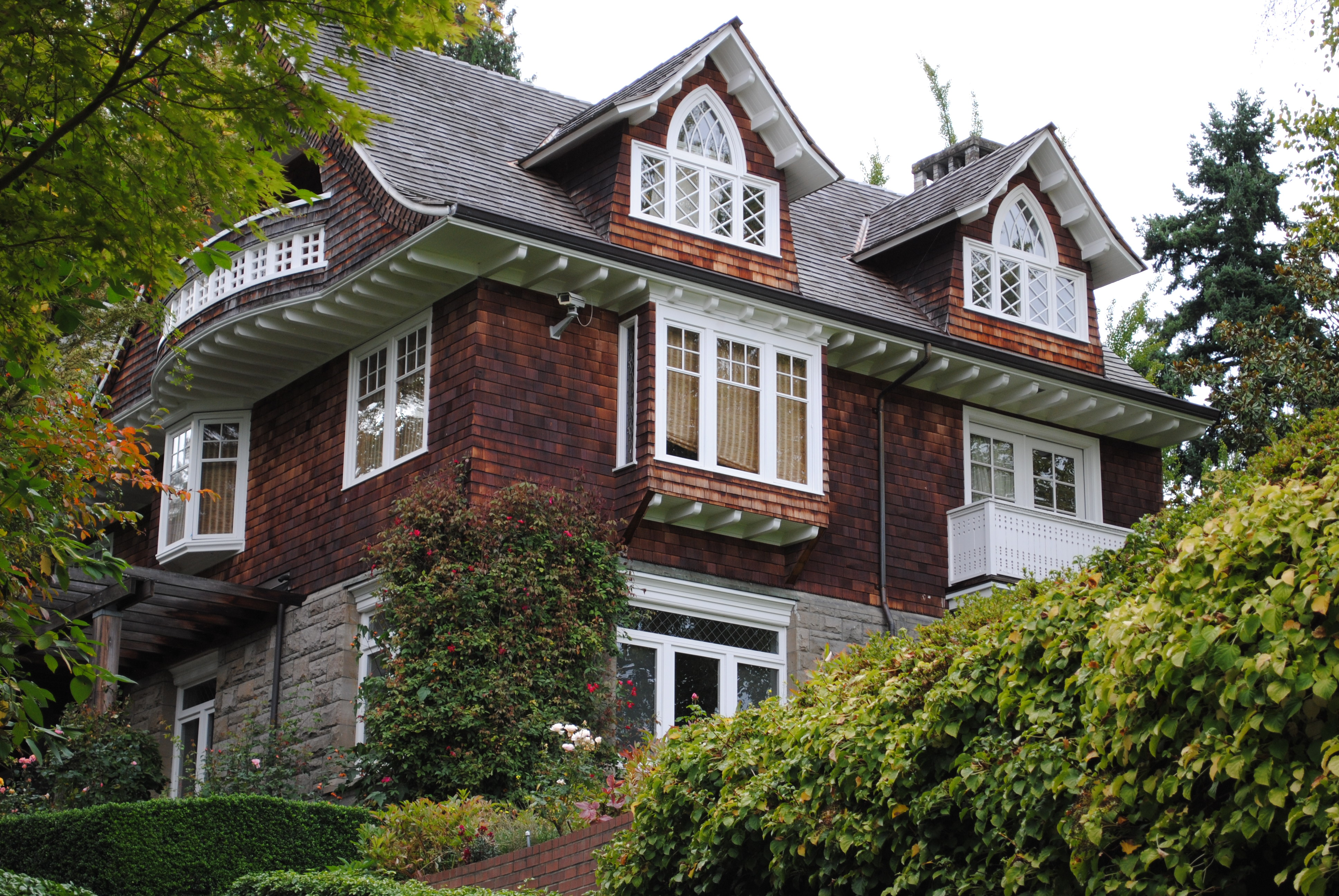
- Kurt Cobain's Seattle home (pictured in 2010), adjacent to the greenhouse on his property where he died
- Date: c. April 5, 1994; 32 years ago
- Location: 171 Lake Washington Blvd E, Denny-Blaine, Seattle, Washington, U.S.
- Type: Suicide by gunshot (twenty-gauge shotgun)
- Deaths: 1 (Kurt Cobain)

On April 8, 1994, Kurt Cobain, the lead singer and guitarist of the American rock band Nirvana, was found dead at his home on Lake Washington Boulevard, Seattle. Forensic investigators and a coroner determined that Cobain had died on approximately April 5, three days prior.

The Seattle Police Department incident report stated that Cobain was found with a Remington Model 11 shotgun across his body and had suffered a visible gunshot wound to the head; a suicide note was also discovered nearby. Seattle police confirmed his death as a suicide.

Conspiracy theories that Cobain was murdered were spread and reported to the FBI, partially due to an Unsolved Mysteries episode dedicated to Cobain's death.

== Background ==
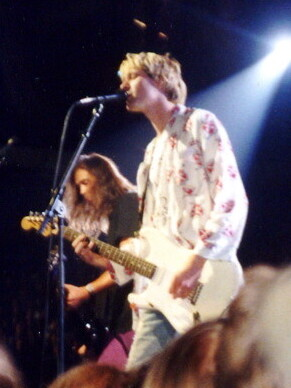
Nirvana pictured in 1992; Cobain with guitar

Kurt Cobain was the lead singer and guitarist of the American rock band Nirvana, one of the most influential acts of the 1990s and one of the best-selling bands of all time. Throughout most of his life, Cobain had chronic bronchitis and intense pain due to an undiagnosed chronic stomach condition. He was also prone to alcoholism, suffered from depression, and regularly used drugs and inhalants. Cobain had two uncles who died of suicide by firearm. Cobain's cousin Beverly, a nurse, said that the family had a history of suicide, and that Cobain had been diagnosed with bipolar disorder and ADHD.

Cobain said that his stomach pain had been so severe during Nirvana's 1991 European tour that he became suicidal, and that taking heroin was "the only thing that's saving me from shooting myself right now". He said later: "I remember saying I'll never go on tour again until I have this fixed because I wanted to kill myself. I wanted to fucking blow my head off. I was so tired of it."

On March 4, 1994, Cobain was hospitalized in Rome following an overdose of Rohypnol (Flunitrazepam) and alcohol at the Westin Excelsior Rome. His management agency, Gold Mountain Records, said the overdose was accidental and that he was ill from influenza and fatigue. However, Cobain's wife, Courtney Love, later said the overdose had been a suicide attempt: "He took 50 pills. He probably forgot how many he took. But there was a definite suicidal urge, to be gobbling and gobbling and gobbling."

Love arranged an intervention regarding Cobain's drug use on March 25, 1994. In Charles R. Cross's biography Heavier Than Heaven, the Nirvana bassist, Krist Novoselic, is quoted on seeing Cobain in the days before the intervention: "He was really quiet. He was just estranged from all of his relationships. He wasn't connecting with anybody." Novoselic's offer to buy dinner for Cobain resulted in unintentionally driving him to score heroin: "His dealer was right there. He wanted to get fucked up into oblivion ... He wanted to die, that's what he wanted to do." The drummer, Dave Grohl, reflected that when Nirvana recorded the song "You Know You're Right", "It was not a pleasant time for the band. Kurt was unwell. Then he was well. Then he was unwell. The last year of the band was tough."

Cobain agreed to undergo a detox program, and he entered a residential facility in Los Angeles for a few days on March 30, 1994. The same day he left for Los Angeles, Cobain asked his friend, Dylan Carlson, to buy a shotgun for him saying it was for "self-protection". On April 1, Cobain left Exodus Recovery Center, the Los Angeles drug rehabilitation clinic he had checked into two days before, by scaling a six-foot wall. On April 6, in accordance with Cobain's ongoing health problems, Nirvana withdrew from Lollapalooza 94, with rumors circulating that the group had broken up.

== Death ==
On April 8, 1994, Cobain's body was discovered in the greenhouse above the garage at his Lake Washington Boulevard East house by a VECA Electric worker who was there to install security lighting. The worker thought Cobain was asleep until he saw blood coming from his ear. He also found a suicide note with a pen stuck through it inside a flowerpot. A Remington Model 11 20-gauge shotgun purchased for Cobain by his friend, musician Dylan Carlson, was found on Cobain's chest. It had been legally purchased by Carlson at Stan Baker's Gun Shop in Seattle.

Cobain did not want the gun purchased in his name because he thought that existing red flag laws would result in police seizing the weapon for his own protection; his guns had been confiscated twice in the ten months before his suicide. The King County medical examiner noted puncture wounds on the inside of both the right and left elbows. The shotgun was checked for fingerprints on May 6, but only managed to find a few unidentifiable smudged prints. The Seattle police report states that the shotgun was inverted on Cobain's chest with his left hand wrapped around the barrel.

On April 14, the Seattle Post-Intelligencer reported that Cobain was "high on heroin when he pulled the trigger". The paper reported that the toxicological tests determined that the level of morphine in Cobain's bloodstream was 1.52 milligrams per liter and that there was evidence of Valium in his blood. The report contained a quote from Randall Baselt of the Chemical Toxicological Institute and author of all 12 editions of the common forensic toxicology textbook Disposition of Toxic Drugs and Chemicals in Man (including its chapter on heroin) which stated that Cobain's heroin level was at "a high concentration, by any account" but that the strength of the dose would depend on many factors, including how habituated Cobain was to the drug.

In March 2014, the Seattle Police Department (SPD) developed four rolls of film that had been left in an evidence vault. According to Seattle police, the photographs depict the scene of Cobain's corpse more clearly than previous Polaroid images taken by the police. Detective Mike Ciesynski, a cold case investigator, was asked to look at the film because "it is 20 years later and it's a high media case". One photo shows Cobain's arm, still wearing the hospital bracelet from the drug rehab facility he had left just a few days prior to returning to Seattle. Another photo shows Cobain's foot resting next to a bag of shotgun shells, one of which was used in his death. Ciesynski stated that the official cause of Cobain's death remained suicide and that the images would not be released to the public; however, the images were released in 2016. According to a police spokesperson, the SPD receives at least one request weekly, mostly through Twitter, to reopen the investigation. This resulted in the maintenance of the basic incident report on file.

== Suicide note ==
Cobain's suicide note

Cobain's suicide note reads:

To Boddah

Speaking from the tongue of an experienced simpleton who obviously would rather be an emasculated, infantile complainee. This note should be pretty easy to understand.

All the warnings from the punk rock 101 courses over the years, since my first introduction to the, shall we say, ethics involved with independence and the embracement of your community has proven to be very true. I havent felt the excitement of listening to as well as creating music along with reading and writing for too many years now. I feel guilty beyond words about these things.

For example when were back stage and the lights go out and the manic roar of the crowds begins It doesnt affect me the way in which it did for Freddy Mercury who seemed to love, relish in the love and adoration from the crowd which is something I totally admire and envy. The fact is, I cant fool you, any one of you. It simply isnt fair to you or me. The worst crime I can think of would be to rip people off by faking it and pretending as if im having 100% fun. Sometimes I feel as if I should have a punch in time clock before I walk out on stage. Ive tried everything within my power to appreciate it (and I do, God, believe me I do, but its not enough). I appreciate the fact that I and we have affected and entertained a lot of people. I must be one of those narcissists who only appreciate things when theyre gone. Im too sensitive. I need to be slightly numb in order to regain the enthusiasms I once had as a child.

On our last 3 tours, Ive had a much better appreciation for all the people Ive known personally, and as fans of our music, but I still can't get over the frustration, the guilt and empathy I have for everyone. Theres good in all of us and I think I simply love people too much, so much that it makes me feel too fucking sad. The sad little, sensitive, unappreciative, Pisces, Jesus man. Why dont you just enjoy it? I dont know!

I have a goddess of a wife who sweats ambition and empathy and a daughter who reminds me too much of what I used to be, full of love and joy, kissing every person she meets because everyone is good and will do her no harm. And that terrifies me to the point to where I can barely function. I cant stand the thought of Frances becoming the miserable, self-destructive, death rocker that Ive become.

I have it good, very good, and Im grateful, but since the age of seven, Ive become hateful towards all humans in general. Only because it seems so easy for people to get along that have empathy. Only because I love and feel sorry for people too much I guess.

Thank you all from the pit of my burning, nauseous stomach for your letters and concern during the past years. Im too much of an erratic, moody baby! I dont have the passion anymore and so remember, its better to burn out than to fade away.

peace, love, empathy. Kurt Cobain

Frances and Courtney, Ill be at your altar. Please keep going Courtney, for Frances. For her life, which will be so much happier without me.

I LOVE YOU, I LOVE YOU! [sic]

"It's better to burn out than to fade away" is a quote from the 1979 Neil Young song "My My, Hey Hey (Out of the Blue)".

== Memorial and cremation ==
On April 10, 1994, a public memorial service was held at Seattle Center, where a recording of Courtney Love reading Cobain's suicide note was played. Near the end of the vigil, Love arrived, and distributed some of his clothing to fans who remained. In the following days, Love consoled and mourned with fans who came to her house.

Cobain's body was cremated. Love divided his ashes; she kept some in a teddy bear and some in an urn. She took another portion of his ashes to the Namgyal Buddhist Monastery in Ithaca, New York. There, some of his remains were ceremonially blessed by Buddhist monks and mixed into clay, which were used to make tsatsas. A final ceremony was arranged for Cobain by his mother on May 31, 1999, that was attended by both Love and Tracy Marander. A Buddhist monk chanted while Cobain's daughter, Frances Bean Cobain, scattered his ashes into McLane Creek in Olympia, Washington, the city where he "had found his true artistic muse".

== Reactions ==
MTV News Special Report on the suicide of Kurt Cobain (1994)
- MTV News anchor Kurt Loder and Rolling Stone music editor David Fricke react to the death of Kurt Cobain, April 1994, MTV News

Several of Cobain's friends were surprised by his suicide. Mark Lanegan, a long-time friend of Cobain, told Rolling Stone: "I never knew Cobain to be suicidal. I just knew he was going through a tough time." In the same article, Carlson stated that he wished Cobain or someone close to him had told him that the Rome incident was a suicide attempt. Danny Goldberg, founder of Gold Mountain Records, refers in his book Dispatches From the Culture Wars: How the Left Lost Teen Spirit to "the crazy Internet rumors that Kurt Cobain had not committed suicide but had been murdered," stating that Cobain's suicide "haunts him every day".

The song "Tearjerker" from the Red Hot Chili Peppers album One Hot Minute (1995) was written about Cobain. Anthony Kiedis, the lead singer, wrote in his autobiography, Scar Tissue:

The news [of Cobain's death] sucked the air out of the entire house, I didn't feel like I felt when Hillel died; it was more like "The world just suffered a great loss." Kurt's death was unexpected ... It was an emotional blow, and we all felt it. I don't know why everyone on earth felt so close to that guy; he was beloved and endearing and inoffensive in some weird way. For all of his screaming and all of his darkness, he was just lovable.

The songwriter Neil Young, whom Cobain quoted in his suicide note, wrote in his biography that reading the note "struck a deep chord inside of me. It fucked with me." He said that he had been attempting to contact him to help him with his problems in the weeks before his death. A musical hero of Cobain's, Greg Sage, said:

Well, I can't really speculate other than what he said to me, which was, he wasn't at all happy about it, success to him seemed like, I think, a brick wall. There was nowhere else to go but down, it was too artificial for him, and he wasn't an artificial person at all. He was actually, two weeks after he died, he was supposed to come here and he wanted to record a bunch of Leadbelly covers. It was kind of in secret, because, I mean, people would definitely not allow him to do that. You also have to wonder, he was a billion-dollar industry at the time, and if the industry had any idea at all of him wishing or wanting to get out, they couldn't have allowed that, you know, in life, because if he was just to get out of the scene, he'd be totally forgotten, but if he was to die, he'd be immortalized.

Cobain's death drew international fame and became a topic of public fascination and debate. Within hours, stocks ran low of Nirvana records in stores, including in the United Kingdom, where Nirvana sales rose dramatically. In addition, unused Nirvana concert tickets were being sold for inflated prices on the used market.

== Conspiracy theories ==
=== Richard Lee ===
The first to object publicly to the report of suicide was Seattle public access host Richard Lee. A week following Cobain's death, Lee aired the first episode of an ongoing series called Kurt Cobain Was Murdered, saying there were several discrepancies in the police reports, including several changes in the nature of the shotgun blast. Lee acquired a video that was taped on April 8 from the tree outside Cobain's garage, showing the scene around Cobain's body. Several pathology experts have stated that a shotgun blast inside the mouth often results in less blood, unlike a shotgun blast to the head.

=== Tom Grant ===
Tom Grant, a private investigator hired by Love to find Cobain after his departure from drug rehabilitation, said he believes that Cobain was murdered. Grant's theory has been analyzed and questioned by several books, television shows, and films, including in Soaked in Bleach, a 2015 docudrama. Grant was still under Love's employment when Cobain's body was found. Grant has stated that he finds the events surrounding Cobain's death to be "filled with lies, contradictions in logic, and countless inconsistencies. Motivated by profit over truth as well as a web of business deals and personal career considerations, Courtney Love, her lawyers, and many of Courtney's industry supporters have engaged in an effort to keep the public from learning the real facts of this case."

There are several components to Grant's theory. One component is Grant's assertion that Cobain could not have injected himself with such a large dose of heroin and still have been able to pull the trigger. Grant says he based this belief on his lack of knowing about any studies or evidence to indicate that such a high dose could be survived, although he does not rule out whether a counterexample might exist. Another component is Grant's belief that Cobain's note was doctored to make it only appear to be a suicide note. A third component is the purported lack of fingerprints from Cobain or others at the scene. He also asserts that Love had financial motivation to kill Cobain, both in the form of rumors that Cobain was planning to divorce her, and the fact that Cobain had turned down an offer to headline the 1994 Lollapalooza festival for nearly $10 million.

In studying the Rome incident, journalists Ian Halperin and Max Wallace contacted Osvaldo Galletta, who treated Cobain after the incident. Galletta contested the claim that the Rome overdose was a suicide attempt. "We can usually tell a suicide attempt. This didn't look like one to me," said Galletta, who also contradicted Love's claim that 50 Rohypnol pills were removed from Cobain's stomach. Halperin and Wallace mused, "Grant believes Courtney may have mixed a large number of pills into Kurt's champagne so that when he took a drink, he was actually unknowingly ingesting large amounts of the drug, enough to kill him. But if that's the case, why did she call the police when she found him unconscious on the floor? If she wanted Kurt dead, why didn't she just leave him on the floor until he died?"

Grant believes the claim that the Rome incident was a suicide attempt was not made until after Cobain's death. Prior to the shooting, some close to Cobain, notably Gold Mountain Records, firmly denied he had wanted to die. Grant believes that if that were true, Cobain's friends and family would have been told in order that they could keep a close watch on him. However, others assert that these denials were simply self-serving, in an effort to mask what was really going on behind the scenes. Lee Ranaldo, guitarist for Sonic Youth, told Rolling Stone, "Rome was only the latest installment of [those around Cobain] keeping a semblance of normalcy for the outside world."

Grant counters the claim that he profits from the sale of casebook kits on his website by stating that it offsets some of the costs of his investigation. Grant stated: "I wrestled with that [...] but if I go broke, I'll have to give up my pursuit and Courtney wins." Sergeant Donald Cameron, one of the homicide detectives involved in the case, dismissed Grant's theory outright, saying, "[Grant] hasn't shown us a shred of proof that this was anything other than suicide," while Seattle homicide detective Mike Ciesynski, who reviewed the case, was quoted as saying of Grant, "An experienced Det. would never have come up with the theories that he's come up with." Grant in turn has accused Cameron of being a personal friend of Courtney Love. Dylan Carlson told Halperin and Wallace that he also did not believe that Grant's theory was valid, and in an interview with Broomfield implied that if he believed that his friend was murdered, he would have dealt with it himself.

=== Nick Broomfield ===
Filmmaker Nick Broomfield, deciding to investigate the theories himself, brought a film crew to visit a number of people associated with both Cobain and Love, including Love's estranged father, Cobain's aunt, and one of the couples' former nannies. Broomfield also spoke to the Mentors' bandleader Eldon Hoke, who claimed that Love had offered him $50,000 to kill Cobain. Although Hoke claimed that he knew who killed Cobain, he did not mention a name and offered no evidence to support his assertion. However, he mentioned speaking to someone called "Allen" or "Alain", before quickly interjecting, "I mean, my friend", then laughing, "I'll let the FBI catch him." According to Mentors' bass player Steve Broy, the whole story was concocted to sell supermarket tabloids. Broomfield incidentally captured Hoke's final interview, as he died days later when he was struck by a train in the middle of the night.

Broomfield titled the finished documentary Kurt & Courtney, which was released on February 27, 1998. In the end, Broomfield felt he had not uncovered enough evidence to conclude the existence of a conspiracy. In a 1998 interview, he summed up his thoughts: "I think that he committed suicide. I don't think that there's a smoking gun. And I think there's only one way you can explain a lot of things around his death. Not that he was murdered, but that there was just a lack of caring for him. I just think that Courtney had moved on, and he was expendable."

=== Ian Halperin and Max Wallace ===
Journalists Ian Halperin and Max Wallace followed a similar path and attempted to investigate the murder theory themselves. Based on evidence gathered in interviews, Halperin and Wallace believed that Cobain wanted to divorce Love near the time of his death, and that she was looking for "a vicious divorce lawyer" to help crush a prenuptial agreement she had reportedly signed that would keep their respective fortunes separate in the event of divorce. They also made the case that because Nikolas Hartshorne (the coroner in Cobain's case) was an admitted friend of Love's, that this was a conflict of interest. Their initial book, Who Killed Kurt Cobain?, was released in 1999, and drew a similar conclusion to Broomfield's film: while there wasn't enough evidence to conclusively prove foul play, there was more than enough to demand that the case be reopened. A notable element of the book included their discussions with Grant, who had taped nearly every conversation he had undertaken while he was working for Love. Over the next several years, Halperin and Wallace collaborated with Grant to write a second book, 2004's Love and Death: The Murder of Kurt Cobain.

=== Friends and family ===
The overall consensus amongst Cobain's close friends and family is that he died by suicide. However, some of Cobain's friends and family members also believe Cobain was murdered. Hank Harrison, Courtney Love's father, has shared his belief that Love had a motive, there is evidence of foul play, and the case should be re-opened. Cobain's grandfather, Leland Cobain, also publicly stated that he believed Cobain was murdered.

In August 2005, Sonic Youth's Kim Gordon was asked about Cobain's death in an interview for Uncut Magazine. When asked what she thought to be Cobain's motive for suicide, Gordon replied: "I don't even know that he killed himself. There are people close to him who don't think that he did ..." When asked if she thought someone else had killed him, Gordon answered, "I do, yes." In the same interview, Gordon's then-husband and collaborator Thurston Moore stated:

Kurt died in a very harsh way. It wasn't just an OD. He actually killed himself violently. It was so aggressive, and he wasn't an aggressive person, he was a smart person, he had an interesting intellect. So it kind of made sense because it was like: wow, what a fucking gesture. But at the same time it was like: something's wrong with that gesture. It doesn't really lie with what we know.

However, in 2015, in a piece she wrote for The Guardian, Gordon said that she had not been surprised to hear of Cobain's suicide, stating, "I'll always remember the day Thurston called to tell me Kurt had shot himself. Of course I was totally shocked, but I wasn't entirely surprised. There had been an incident in Rome, where Kurt had OD'd, but the details were never clear."

Others, however, have dismissed or ignored the conspiracy theories surrounding Cobain's death. In an interview with The Independent, former Nirvana manager and friend of Cobain, Danny Goldberg, emphasized Cobain's erratic and depressed behavior in the days and weeks leading up to his death, stating,

It's ridiculous. He killed himself. I saw him the week beforehand, he was depressed. He tried to kill himself six weeks earlier, he'd talked and written about suicide a lot, he was on drugs, he got a gun. Why do people speculate about it? The tragedy of the loss is so great people look for other explanations. I don't think there's any truth at all to it.
