= Nirvana: Flower Sniffin', Kitty Pettin', Baby Kissin' Corporate Rock Whores =

Unpublished 1993 book about Nirvana

- Author: Victoria Clarke and Britt Collins
- Language: English
- Publisher: Hyperion
- Publication date: July 1, 1993 (cancelled)
- Publication place: United Kingdom
- Media type: paperback
- Pages: 208
- ISBN: 978-1562828615

Nirvana: Flower Sniffin', Kitty Pettin', Baby Kissin' Corporate Rock Whores was a book written by Victoria Clarke and Britt Collins in 1992–93 about American rock band Nirvana and in particular the band leader Kurt Cobain and his wife Courtney Love. Cobain and Love opposed the publication of the book and Nirvana's management company filed a lawsuit that prevented it from being published.

== Premise ==
The book was written by UK writers Victoria Clarke and Britt Collins. Clarke had been given a backstage pass for Nirvana's European tour in June 1992 and went on tour with the band, while Collins traveled to the United States to research the grunge scene in Seattle. Cobain and Love subsequently left many threatening phone messages for the authors to try and deter them from publishing the book. The reason Cobain and Love were against the book being published was because one of the sources the authors had used was Lynn Hirschberg who had written a damning article about Love in Vanity Fair. Cobain and Love subsequently left 5,000 words and 31 minutes of angry and obscene messages for the authors. Cobain and Love denied harassing the writers.

According to WBEZ, a reading of the advance manuscript of the book revealed that the authors did not find any embarrassing or controversial information on Cobain and Love, and that they relied extensively on previously published sources. Entertainment Weekly reported in December 1992 that the book was still going to be published by Hyperion in the summer of 1993. However, Nirvana's management company, Gold Mountain Entertainment, filed a lawsuit against the authors to not publish the book, and the book was never published. Nirvana's manager, Danny Goldberg, later admitted that Love and Cobain did make the calls but that he lied about at the time to protect his clients. He suggested that the couple should write an official biography which lead to the publication of Come as You Are: The Story of Nirvana in October 1993.

The title of the book, Flower Sniffin', Kitty Pettin', Baby Kissin' Corporate Rock Whores, came from a motto on one of Nirvana's t-shirts.

An interview with Clarke was included in the 1998 documentary film, Kurt & Courtney, where she describes how Love assaulted her by attacking her with a glass and dragging her along the floor by her hair.

== See also ==
- Teen Spirit: The Stories Behind Every Nirvana Song, 1996 book.
- Who Killed Kurt Cobain?, 1998 book.
