= A Tribute to Kurt Cobain =

- Original VHS cover art
- Release date: June 1994
- Running time: 39 minutes
- Country: England
- Language: English

A Tribute to Kurt Cobain also called Nirvana: Tribute to Kurt Cobain in the US is a documentary about Kurt Cobain who was the lead singer and guitarist of American rock band Nirvana and who committed suicide in April 1994. It was released in June 1994 and is significant as the first unofficial Nirvana or Kurt Cobain documentary to be available as a home video. It peaked at number 22 on Billboard's Top Video Sales chart.

== Release ==
The documentary was released on VHS in June 1994. It features a brief history of Cobain's band Nirvana followed mostly by interviews with people who met him or knew him personally, including his guitar teacher, Warren Mason. It also features an interview with the doctor who treated Cobain after he had overdosed in Rome in March 1994 and with the electrician who discovered his body after he had died in April 1994. It also features Cobain's wife, Courtney Love, reading parts of his suicide note which was played as a recording to a crowd of fans at his memorial vigil in Seattle.

== Charts ==
US cover art

| Chart (1994) | Peak position |
|---|---|
| US Top Video Sales (Billboard) | 22 |

== See also ==
- Teen Spirit: The Tribute to Kurt Cobain, 1996 documentary
- Hype!, 1996 documentary
- Kurt & Courtney, 1998 documentary
- The Vigil, 1998 film
