= Giallo Queens =

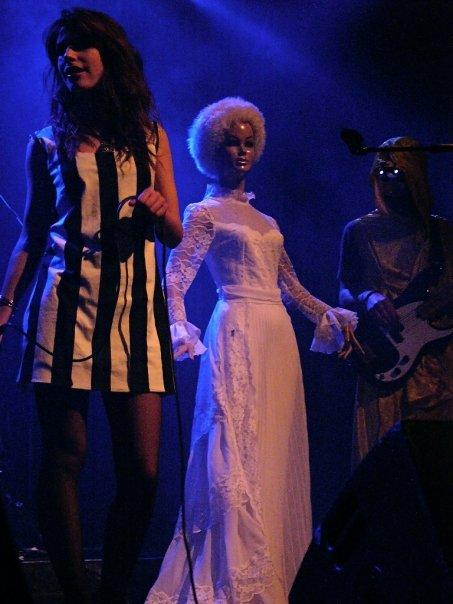
- Giallo Queens performing at Turin in Italy, on April 15, 2007

Background information
- Origin: London, England
- Genres: Rock, pop, experimental, shock rock
- Years active: 1971–1982; 2007–present
- Label: Tragedy Records
- Members: Unknown
- Past members: Paul Statham; Ambrose Crow; Chas Powell; Candid Lee; Clara Wisp
- Website: www.gialloqueens.co.uk

Giallo Queens is an English rock band primarily from the 1970s who went through several genres, ranging from pop ballads to experimental music, often incorporating theatrical shock rock. The individual members operate under anonymity, wearing masks during public performances, with the exception of the singer. After a break up in 1982, the band reformed in 2007 and began a series of tours in Europe.

== Career ==
=== The Giallos ===
In 1971, drummer Paul Statham, pianist Ambrose Crow and guitarist Chas Powell joined with singer Candid Lee to form a pop group called The Giallos.

Their first success came with the single "I Like Birds" in mid-1972 which secured them a contract with Tragedy Records. The second single, "Girl From Mars", in April 1973, was well received within the avant-garde milieu. The Giallos built their reputation playing clubs in London over the three-year period that followed, synthesizing their works in the album Obscure Destiny (1976), which sold poorly.

Upon the death of their lead singer Candid Lee in a plane crash in March 1976, The Giallos decided a change of tone and name.

=== Giallo Queens ===
The 1976 April concert at Liverpool was operated under the name Giallo Queens. As a tribute to Lee, the musicians wore sad masks. Only their new singer, Clara Wisp, showed her face. The public reaction was immediate and sent the Giallo Queens into the attention of the media. Under the management of Tragedy Records the band developed a dark, mysterious aspect and released an album at the end of the year called Beyond A Laudanum Rainbow (1976). Several songs referred directly to Lee's disappearance, such as "Crashin' Planes".

== Scenography ==
Giallo Queens mixed planned, complex scenes involving strong emotions, esoteric lyrics and esthetic choreographies with moments of improvisation.

=== Masks ===
Previously to Candid's accident, the musicians of the Giallos were sometimes wearing outrageous make up, but since the 1976 April concert of Giallo Queens they have been wearing masks concealing their identity. Some of their songs actually play with this. The 1982 album Behind Their Human Masks is full of such references. Their actual identities are unknown. This unusual situation is similar to the Residents, a band from the same era.

== Visual parallels and renewed interest ==
Since 2023, fans have pointed out visual parallels between Giallo Queens and the aesthetics of the Swedish band Ghost (band). Elements such as metallic masks, high hats, ritualistic stage presence and esoteric imagery have fueled online comparisons.

=== Executions ===
With a dramatization inspired by the German Expressionism of the 30', the Giallo Queens scenified obviously fake executions. Alice Cooper acknowledged their existence in a rare interview, though the degree of their mutual influence is unknown. During this period two albums were released: Guillotine Carnival (1979) and Cabaret Apocalypse (1981)

=== Final years ===
Giallo Queens disbanded by the end of 1982.

== Documentary and media resurfacing ==
Between 2008 and 2016, several rare video archives and interviews related to Giallo Queens began resurfacing online. These included concert footage, VHS-style fragments, and testimonial clips involving figures from the rock scene such as Motörhead, Alice Cooper, Thin Lizzy or Hawkwind. Some of these documents also featured references to the mysterious disappearances of the group's rotating lead singers.

A feature-length audiovisual project, titled *Rock n Roll Over: A Story of the Giallo Queens*, directed by Enguerran Prieu has been circulating in underground circles. The film is considered a key visual source about the band, compiling rare materials and attempting to document the elusive myth surrounding their existence. Parts of it have been uploaded on YouTube and shared on social platforms, generating renewed interest.
