= Teen Spirit: The Tribute to Kurt Cobain =

- Original VHS cover art
- Distributed by: Labyrinth Media Ltd
- Release date: 1996
- Running time: 55:00 minutes
- Language: English

Teen Spirit: The Tribute to Kurt Cobain is a documentary about Nirvana band leader Kurt Cobain. It was released in 1996.

== Notable appearances ==
The film features interviews with Charles Peterson, who was Nirvana's photographer. The film also features interviews with writer and pop music critic Ann Powers of The Village Voice, as well as with Grant Alden of The Rocket and Nils Bernstein of Sub Pop, Nirvana's original record label. The film documents Nirvana's rise to stardom, interviews with band members, other musicians, music journalists and fans. It also showcases Cobain's hometown of Aberdeen, Washington to investigate what influenced his musical perspective.

== Critical reception ==
AllMusic gave a poor review of the film, stating that: "Similar in style to the 1998 exploitation documentary Kurt & Courtney, the 1996 home video Teen Spirit: Tribute to Kurt Cobain does a shoddy job of trying to tell the story of Kurt Cobain". However, MVD stated that: "It is a moving tribute to Kurt the man, and his music, from those who were inspired by his extraordinary genius. Allmusic also noted that due to copyrights the film does not include any of Nirvana's music. Radio & Records described the film as the "video scrapbook companion to Nirvana's From the Muddy Banks of the Wishkah LP".

== Re-release ==
The film was re-released on DVD in 2001 as an extended director's cut of 75 minutes long with a different cover art.

== Charts ==
=== Weekly charts ===
Chart (1996)	Peak position
UK Music Videos (Official Charts)	21

Chart (1997)	Peak position
UK Music Videos (Official Charts)	19
US Top Music Video Sales (Billboard)	12

=== Year-end charts ===
Chart (1997)	Position
US Top Music Videos (Billboard)	32

== Soundtrack ==
A soundtrack album was released in 1999 which featured the documentary on CD.

== See also ==
- A Tribute to Kurt Cobain, 1994 documentary.
- Teen Spirit: The Stories Behind Every Nirvana Song, 1996 book.
