= Kurt & Courtney =

1998 documentary film

- Directed by: Nick Broomfield
- Written by: Nick Broomfield
- Produced by: Nick Broomfield
- Narrated by: Nick Broomfield
- Cinematography: Joan Churchill; Alex Vender
- Edited by: Mark Atkins; Harley Escudier
- Music by: David Bergeaud; Dylan Carlson
- Distributed by: Capitol Films
- Release dates: 27 February 1998 (United States); 3 July 1998 (United Kingdom)
- Running time: 95 minutes
- Country: United Kingdom
- Language: English

Kurt & Courtney is a 1998 British documentary film by Nick Broomfield investigating the circumstances surrounding the death of Kurt Cobain, and allegations of Courtney Love's involvement in it.

== Synopsis ==
The documentary begins as an investigation of the circumstances surrounding Cobain's death and the theories which sprung up afterwards. Cobain was legally declared to have committed suicide but has been alleged by some, to have been murdered, in some allegations at Courtney Love's instigation.

As Broomfield investigates the claims surrounding Cobain's death, his emphasis moves from the murder theories and onto an investigation of Love herself, including an accusation that she supports the suppression of free speech, and her fame after Cobain's death.

The film was due to play the Sundance Film Festival but Love threatened to sue the festival's organizers if they screened the film. Broomfield removed all of Nirvana's music, and replaced it with music from bands mainly from the Seattle area. However, when shown on the BBC, the film contained Nirvana's 1991 performance of "Smells Like Teen Spirit" from Top of the Pops.

While the initial focus of the film was to explore the possible murder of Cobain, Courtney Love's refusal to license any of Cobain's music, and her unwillingness to speak on camera was used by Broomfield as evidence of her censorship of free speech.

The film begins with a recap of Cobain's death and the media coverage which followed. Broomfield then interviews Cobain's aunt Mary who helped his love for music when he was a child. This interview is followed up with several from friends and schoolteachers who knew Cobain when he was growing up before moving onto Cobain's relationship with Courtney Love.

After establishing the background the film moves on to detail the accusations that Cobain was murdered. Broomfield interviews Tom Grant, a private investigator who has alleged that Love may have conspired to kill her husband, and wants the case re-opened by the Seattle Police Department. Grant was hired by Love, but thinks it was just so people would believe that she was innocent. Hank Harrison, Courtney Love's father, is interviewed, and states he also believes that Cobain may have been killed in a conspiracy organised by Love. He has written two books about Cobain's death.

The film also includes interviews with Portland drug culture celeb and former stripper, Amy Squier, about her explicit and personal knowledge of Kurt and Courtney's heroin use, and an interview with The Mentors singer El Duce (real name Eldon Wayne Hoke), who claimed that Love offered him $50,000 to kill Cobain. El Duce claimed in the film that he knew who killed Cobain, but said he would "let the FBI catch him." Eight days after that interview was filmed, El Duce was killed when he was hit by a train.

Broomfield also shows an interview with Al Bowman, a minor Hollywood promoter, along with Norm Lubow (in disguise and using the alias "Jack Briggs"). Both introduced Broomfield to Eldon Hoke.

The film also includes an interview with musician and friend of Cobain's Dylan Carlson, who had bought the shotgun that Cobain eventually used to kill himself.

Broomfield eventually moves away from the alleged conspiracy and the film turns into an investigation of Courtney Love's alleged suppression of free speech. Included in the film are phone calls from MTV saying that they were pulling out of financing the film (which was completed thanks to financing from private investors and the BBC), due to presumed pressure from Love.

A threatening phone message from Love to Lynn Hirschberg is played which was made after Hirschberg had written an article in Vanity Fair stating that Love had used heroin while pregnant with daughter Frances Bean Cobain. Broomfield also explains how Love tried to attack Hirschberg at the Academy Awards using Quentin Tarantino's Oscar. There is also an interview with journalist Victoria Clarke (who wrote the book Nirvana: Flower Sniffin', Kitty Pettin', Baby Kissin' Corporate Rock Whores with Britt Collins) about how Love and Cobain had threatened her while doing research for her book on Cobain and Nirvana. Broomfield includes clips in the film of the threats made by Cobain, and Clarke details the story of Love assaulting her by attacking her with a glass and dragging her along the floor by her hair.

The film concludes with Broomfield taking the stage at an ACLU meeting (where Love is a guest speaker) to publicly question Love about her attempts to suppress free speech and the irony of her representing the ACLU. He is pulled from the stage by Danny Goldberg, Cobain's former manager.

== Music ==
Because of Love's refusal to license Nirvana's music for the project, Nick Broomfield was forced to use various other bands from the Pacific Northwest. Notable amongst these were Zeke, the Dwarves, Rozz Rezabek and the Theater of Sheep, and Earth.

== Reception ==
Riding a wave of controversy, Kurt & Courtney opened in one North American theatre on 27 February 1998, where it grossed $16,835 in its opening weekend. The film's final $668,228 gross was respectable considering the film's limited release (only 12 theatres at its widest point), independent distribution, documentary nature, and mixed reviews.

In a review by Roger Ebert, he said that "Broomfield's film opens with Love as a suspect, only to decide she was probably not involved, and the movie ends in murky speculation without drawing any conclusions". A review in the newspaper Providence Phoenix stated that "All in all there's nothing here to persuade even the most zealous Marcia Clark disciple to open a case against Courtney, but plenty of fodder for the kind of fascinating films Broomfield likes to make".

The second edition of the Ian Halperin and Max Wallace book Who Killed Kurt Cobain?, which was released in 2000, details how Love tried to stop its original 1998 publication as well as trying to stop the 1998 documentary film, Kurt & Courtney, from being released.

On the review aggregator website Rotten Tomatoes, 62% of 55 critics' reviews are positive, with an average rating of 6/10. The website's consensus reads: "Even if its desultory drift keeps it from reaching nirvana, Kurt & Courtney is an entertaining attempt to chronicle the life and death of a troubled genius."

== Charts ==
Chart (1998)	Peak position
UK Videos (OCC)	95

== See also ==
- Soaked in Bleach (2015 docudrama on the same subject).
