= Oblivion Train =

Single by Mentors
- B-side: "Cornshucker"
- Released: 2009
- Recorded: 1977; Seattle, Washington
- Label: Stool Sample

"Oblivion Train" is the first and only single by the Mentors. It was released in 2009 by Stool Sample Records and contains two early tracks recorded in Dr. Heathen Scum's basement in 1977. The title track previously appeared on Sex, Drugs and Rock 'n Roll in 1989, although the version here is a much earlier one. The B-side has never been officially released, although a later version from 1986 appears on a reel-to-reel tape downloadable from the Internet Archive.

== Track list ==
No.	Title	Length
1.	"Oblivion Train"	2:28
2.	"Cornshucker"	2:55
