= List of shock rock musicians =

The following is a list of shock rock artists with articles on Wikipedia.

== List ==
=== A ===
- Alice Cooper
- GG Allin
- Anal Cunt

=== B ===
- David Bowie
- Arthur Brown

=== C ===
- The Cramps
- The Crazy World of Arthur Brown

=== D ===
- Death SS
- Dwarves

=== E ===
- The Eighties Matchbox B-Line Disaster

=== G ===
- Ghost
- Ghoul
- Gorgoroth
- Gwar

=== H ===
- Halloween
- Screamin' Jay Hawkins

=== I ===
- Impaler

=== K ===
- King Diamond
- Kiss

=== L ===
- Lordi
- Lux Interior

=== M ===
- Marilyn Manson
- Mentors
- Misfits
- Mudvayne

=== N ===
- Nashville Pussy

=== O ===
- Ozzy Osbourne (early)

=== P ===
- Plasmatics
- Iggy Pop

=== R ===
- Rammstein
- Rosemary's Billygoat

=== S ===
- Schoolyard Heroes
- Gene Simmons
- Slipknot
- The Stooges
- Screaming Lord Sutch

=== T ===
- The Tubes
- Twisted Sister

=== W ===
- W.A.S.P.
- Watain
- Wednesday 13
- Wendy O. Williams

=== Z ===
- Matt Zane
- Rob Zombie

== See also ==
- Shock rock
