= Love and Death (disambiguation) =

Love and Death is a 1975 film by Woody Allen.

Love and Death or Love & Death may also refer to:

- Love and Death (band), an American metal band
- Love & Death (EP), an EP by Sentenced
- Love & Death (miniseries), a 2023 HBO mini-series
- Love and Death (novel), a novel based on American TV series Angel
- Love and Death: The Murder of Kurt Cobain, a 2004 book by Ian Halperin and Max Wallace
- Love and Death, a painting by George Frederic Watts

== See also ==
- Love, Death & Robots, an animated Netflix anthology series
- A Walk with Love and Death, a film
- A Walk with Love & Death, an album
