= August Emerson =

American actor

- Born: Parkland, Florida, U.S.
- Occupation: Actor
- Years active: 2005–present

August Emerson is an American actor best known for his work on television, independent film, and musical theatre. He is best known for playing musician Dylan Carlson in the 2015 docudrama Soaked in Bleach. He is currently playing the role of Connor Murphy in the national tour of Dear Evan Hansen.

== Early career ==
Emerson and his sister, Danna Maret, were introduced to acting at a young age. The aspiring actors appeared in local theatre productions and commercials for several years as children in South Florida.

== Career (television and film) ==
He was a recurring regular on the first three seasons of the acclaimed AMC Network drama series Halt and Catch Fire.

In 2015, August co-starred in the controversial docudrama Soaked in Bleach, a film that explores the tragic untimely death of Kurt Cobain. He also had roles in The Mentalist, Bones and ER.
