= Chuck Crisafulli =

American writer and musician

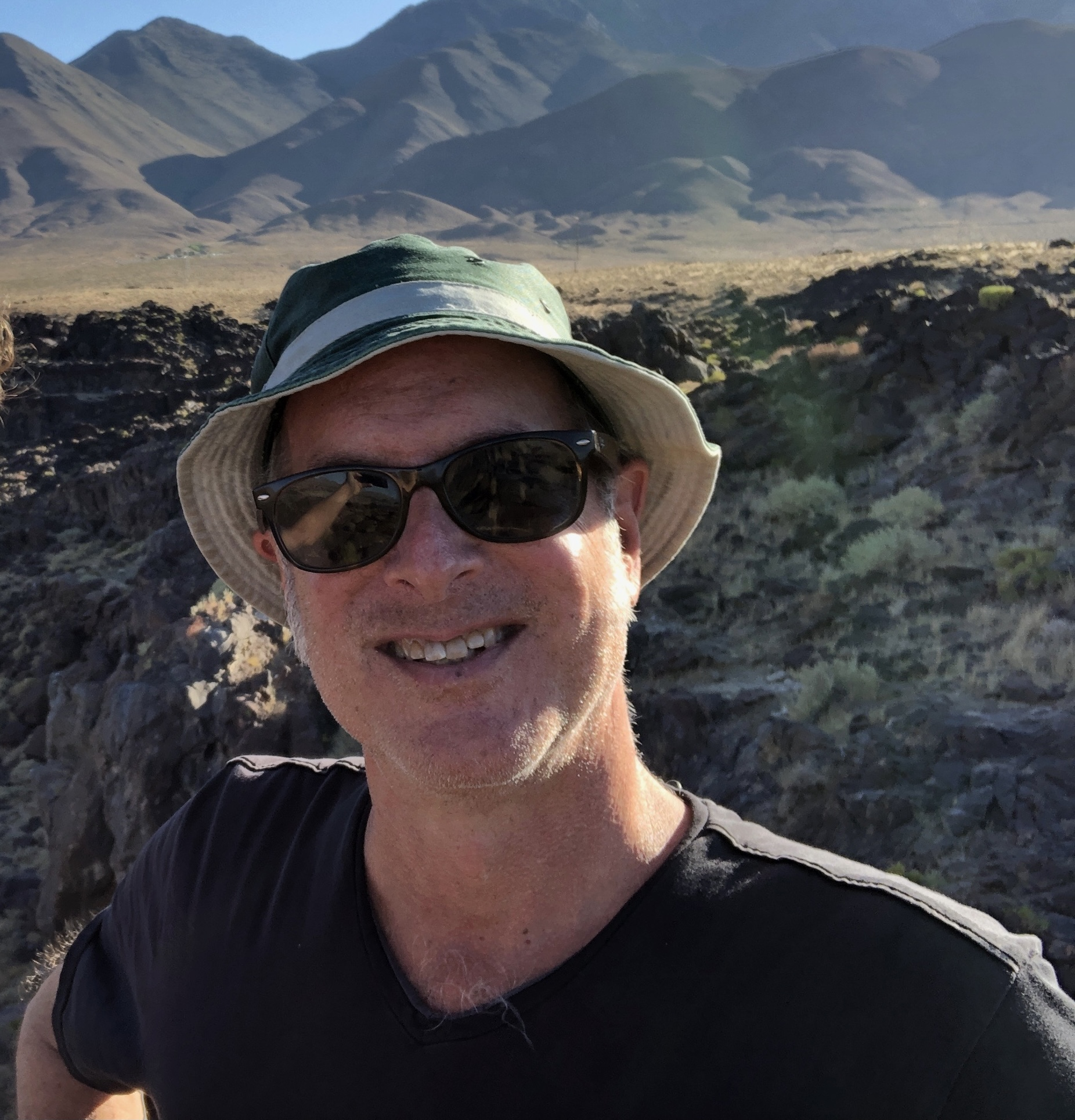
- Crisafulli in 2020
- Born: Charles Crisafulli; December 9, 1961 (age 64); Long Island, New York
- Education: Northwestern University
- Occupations: Author, Culture Writer, Musician
- Partner: Kyra Thompson
- Children: 2
- Writing career
- Years active: 1989–Present
- Website: charliechristmasmusic.com

Chuck "Charlie" Crisafulli is an American author, culture writer and musician. Crisafulli has regularly contributed to Rolling Stone, Grammy Magazine and the Los Angeles Times.

== Biography ==
Crisafulli was born in Freeport, New York, on December 9, 1961. In a podcast interview with Reduced Shakespeare, Crisafulli stated that his musical introduction came with playing tambourine in the fourth grade's school band performance of "Do You Know the Way to San Jose". He attended Baldwin Senior High School before studying at Northwestern University and majoring in English. From Evanston, he moved to New York City where he worked as an English teacher at Bishop Ford High School.

In the late 1980s, Crisafulli moved to Los Angeles. When he first arrived, Crisafulli worked with makeup artist Rick Baker. For a number of years, he made a living on film sets, primarily in the realm of practical effects and puppeteering. Some of the movies he worked on include Batman Returns, The Blob (1988 film) and Gremlins 2: The New Batch.

=== Journalism ===
Still dedicated to a possible career in writing and music, Crisafulli began freelancing at Los Angeles music publications including Music Connection and BAM. In 1992, Crisafulli began working at the Los Angeles Times. Interested in ioncreasing coverage of alternative comedy in Los Angeles, he wrote features about obscure comedians including Sarah Silverman, Janeane Garofalo, Patton Oswalt, David Cross and Bob Odenkirk.

Crisafulli has written articles for Rolling Stone, The Hollywood Reporter, Billboard, Interview, Hustler, High Times, Option, Request and Newsday.

=== Books ===
In the mid-1990s, Crisafulli wrote two books that explored the context behind the songs of The Doors and Nirvana. Moonlight Drive: The Stories Behind Every Doors Song was released in 1995 and Teen Spirit: The Stories Behind Every Nirvana Song came out the following year.

With his wife, Kyra Thompson, Crisafulli co-wrote Go to Hell: A Heated History of the Underworld.

Meeting through mutual friends, Chuck had lunch with Elvis Presley's longtime friend and confidant, Jerry Schilling. Enjoying their conversation, Crisafulli and Schilling decided on the spot to cowrite a book about Schilling's experiences with Presley. In an interview on NPR's Fresh Air, Schilling said the book showed a different side of Presley. Me and a Guy Named Elvis: My Lifelong Friendship with Elvis Presley was released in 2006.

Chuck co-wrote George Klein's Elvis: My Best Man. Klein was a well-known deejay in Memphis who was close to Elvis since they were in eighth grade. Klein and Crisafulli remained close until Klein's death in 2019.

He also co-wrote Running with the Champ: My Forty-Year Friendship with Muhammad Ali, with Ali's close friend, Tim Shanahan.

In 2017, Crisafulli co-wrote Getting to "Yes And": The Art of Business Improv with former Second City faculty member and Baby Wants Candy co-founder, Bob Kulhan. Based on Kulhan's longtime teachings, the book delves into improv's positive application to corporate environments and improving business relationships.

== Critical Reception to Crisafulli's Writing ==
Michiko Kakutani of The New York Times wrote that Shanahan and Crisafulli's Running with the Champ, "Has its share of touching moments... give(s) glimpses of Ali's dignified, decades-long struggle with Parkinson's".

== Music ==
Crisafulli is a multi-instrumentalist. Over the years, he has performed in a variety of groups, including: Moris Tepper, Dogbowl, Shovelhead Bigtop, Filthmobile, Knob & Nozzle, The Blahs, Lisa Parade, The Mobile Homeboys and The Huge Bastards. In his sophomore year at college, Crisafulli met Nash Kato and became the bassist in the original lineup of Urge Overkill. Chuck currently plays the drums in the Santa Barbara-based band, The Doublewide Kings.

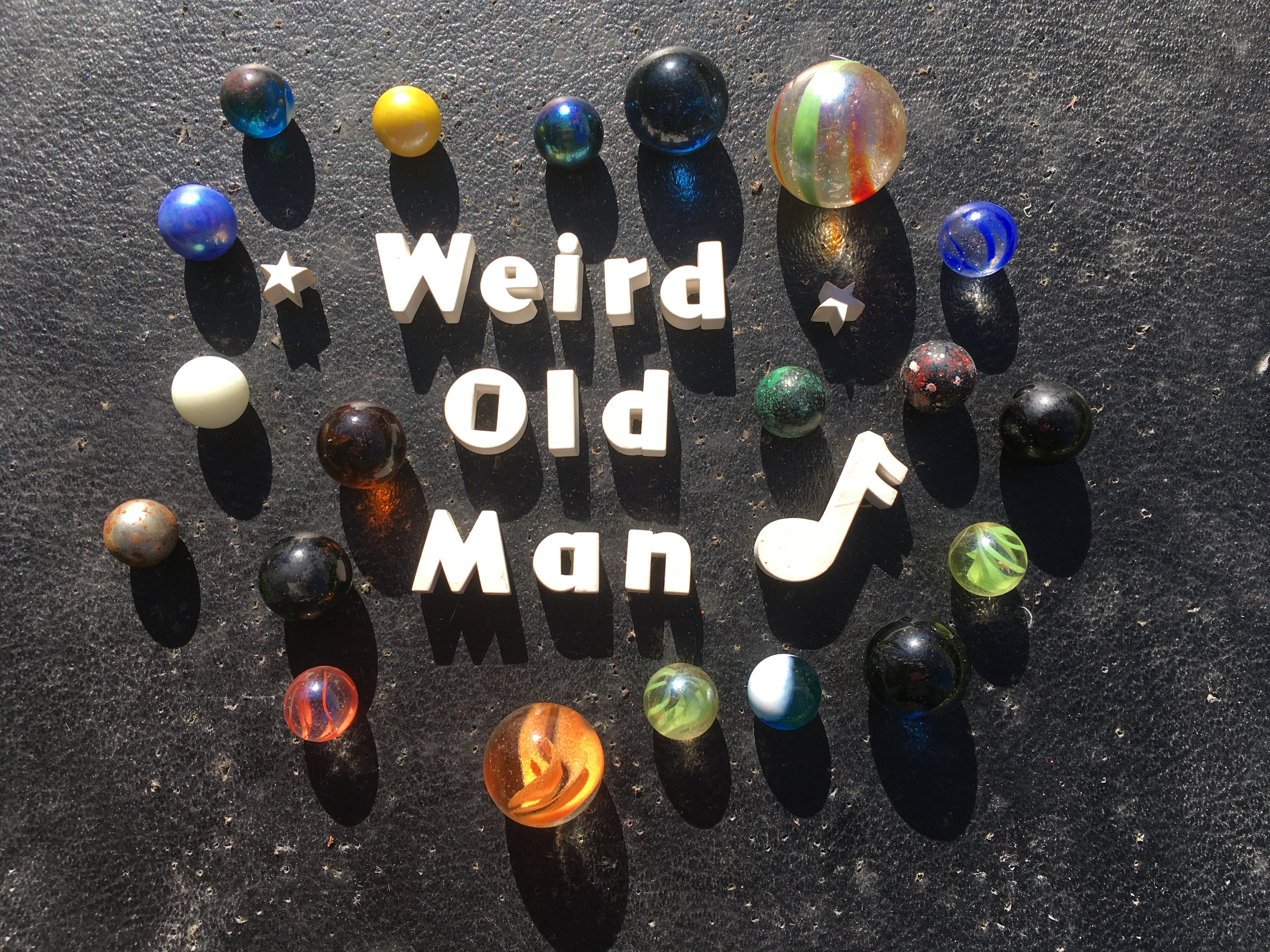
The photo that became the source artwork for Weird Old Man.

Since 2018, Crisafulli has released music online under the alter-ego, Charlie Christmas. Produced from his home garage and sometimes bathroom, the music of Charlie Christmas is a self-described "offering of avant-pop songs, nerd-punk anthems, indie-garage screeds and soft-core instrumentals".

In December 2018, Charlie Christmas released the debut album, Weird Old Man. Weird Old Man received significant airplay on college radio stations.

All instruments on the Charlie Christmas recordings are performed by Crisafulli. On Spotty Coverage, his son, Young Jimmy Christmas, sand and played keys. The EP consists of five tracks, covering artists from Hank Williams to Bachman–Turner Overdrive.

In the legendary New York venue CBGBs, Crisafulli's signature can be seen on the green room wall, directly next to that of the Ramones.

== Critical reception to Crisafulli's musc ==
Weird Old Man picked up a small cult following, with music blog, StereoStickman calling it "a must" for the year, praising its "Bowie-like aura, classic rock and roll with experimental twangs of creative freedom". Dan MacIntosh of Skopemag wrote that it was "inventive, intelligent rock & roll".

== Personal life ==
Crisafulli is married to filmmaker and television producer, Kyra Thompson. They met at Northwestern University. They have been married since 1992. They live in Los Angeles, CA and have two children. He is a lifelong fan of The Beach Boys.

== Bibliography ==
- Moonlight Drive: The Stories Behind Every Doors Song (1995)
- Teen Spirit: The Stories Behind Every Nirvana Song (1996)
- Go to Hell: A Heated History of the Underworld (2005)
- Me and a Guy Named Elvis: My Lifelong Friendship with Elvis Presley (2006)
- Elvis: My Best Man (2011)
- Running with the Champ: My Forty-Year Friendship with Muhammad Ali (2016)
- Getting to "Yes And": The Art of Business Improv (2017)

== Discography ==
=== As Charlie Christmas ===
==== Albums/EPs ====
- Weird Old Man by Charlie Christmas (2018)
- Spotty Coverage by Charlie Christmas, Young Jimmy Christmas (2020)

==== Singles ====
- American Dirt (2010)
- Dark Side of the Mood (2016)
- New Year's Day Martini (2018)
- In Dumb We Trust (2018)
- Happy Day (2019)
- Pandemic Drinking Song (Empty So Fast) (2020)
- You Ain't Seen Nothing Yet (2020)
