= Max Wallace =

Canadian journalist

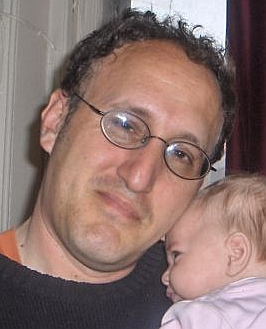
- Born: Maxwell Wallace; United States
- Citizenship: Canadian
- Education: University
- Occupations: Writer, filmmaker, historian, disability advocate
- Writing career
- Language: English
- Period: present
- Genre: non-fiction

Max Wallace is a New York Times-bestselling author and historian specializing in the Holocaust, human rights in sport, and popular culture. He is also a filmmaker, and long-time disability advocate.

== Literary works ==
=== In the Name of Humanity: The Secret Deal to End the Holocaust ===
Winner of the 2018 Canadian Jewish Literary Award (Holocaust category.) Published by Penguin/Random House, this work focuses on the heroic actions of a Swiss-based rescue committee headed by an ultra-Orthodox Jewish couple, Recha and Isaac Sternbuch. The book presents evidence linking Himmler's decree to these secret negotiations after the author discovered documents housed in an Orthodox Jewish archive at New York's Yeshiva University linking Himmler's orders to the Musy negotiations. Among these documents is a cable sent by the Sternbuchs through the Polish diplomatic code to the Vaad ha-Hatzalah in New York on November 20, 1944, detailing Musy's negotiations with Himmler. The cable informed the Vaad that Musy had received a "promise to cease extermination in concentration camps." On November 22, the Sternbuchs sent another cable revealing that the Papal nuncio in Switzerland had "received a promise that the slaughters will cease." Three days later, Himmler ordered the destruction of the Auschwitz extermination apparatus. The Canadian Jewish News described Wallace's book as "an impressive piece of scholarship and a compelling chapter of Holocaust history." The book was also a finalist for the 2018 RBC Taylor Prize for the best work of literary non-fiction.

=== The American Axis: Henry Ford, Charles Lindbergh and the Rise of the Third Reich ===
This work, published in 2003 by St. Martin's Press about the Nazi sympathies of two American icons, received a cover endorsement by two-time Pulitzer-Prize winning historian Arthur Schlesinger Jr. In the book, Wallace details the close collaboration between the aviator Charles Lindbergh and the automotive pioneer Henry Ford and traces the evolution of their sympathetic views on Nazi Germany. As the first unauthorized biographer ever to gain access to Lindbergh's archives at Yale University, Wallace presents details of the flier's many trips to Germany during the 1930s and his increasing admiration for Adolf Hitler and the Third Reich. He reveals evidence that the Germans used Lindbergh as an unwilling dupe so that they could vastly inflate German air estimates although the German air force was much weaker than it pretended. The book argues that Lindbergh's well-publicized description of German air superiority played a major role in the western decision to appease Hitler at Munich in 1938. Only weeks after the Munich Agreement, the Nazis presented Lindbergh with their highest civilian honor, the Order of the German Eagle. Wallace also traces the mysterious evolution of Ford's anti-Semitism, and reveals evidence proving that Ford's private secretary, Ernest Liebold, had been a German spy during the First World War and who was largely responsible for turning Ford against the Jews by convincing him that Jewish communists were conspiring to unionize his company. Liebold also used the Independent as a vehicle to blame Jews the defeat of Germany in the First World War and for the rise of Bolshevism. A series of articles trumpeting that theme was translated into German and published in book form as The International Jew. The book was later cited by many Nazis as deeply influential, including the leader of the Hitler Youth, Baldur von Schirach, who testified at the Nuremberg Trials, "I read it and became anti-Semitic."

=== Who Killed Kurt Cobain? ===
As a former music journalist, Wallace coauthored the international bestseller Who Killed Kurt Cobain? with Ian Halperin in 1998 (described as a "judicious presentation of explosive material" by The New Yorker). Much of the book explores the phenomenon of the 68 copycat suicides following the death of Cobain in April, 1994.

=== Love and Death: The Murder of Kurt Cobain ===
Published in 2004, Wallace wrote Love and Death: The Murder of Kurt Cobain with Halperin, which reached the New York Times bestseller list. The book presents explosive tapes recorded by Beverly Hills Private Investigator Tom Grant, who was hired by Courtney Love to find her husband after Kurt Cobain went missing from a Los Angeles drug rehab facility in April 1994. Among the tapes is a recording of Cobain's entertainment lawyer Rosemary Carroll, godmother to the couple's daughter Frances Bean Cobain, casting doubt on the official suicide theory and revealing Carroll's belief that the suicide note was "forged or traced." On the tapes, Carroll also revealed that Cobain was in the process of divorcing Love at the time of his death.

=== Muhammad Ali's Greatest Fight: Cassius Clay vs. the United States of America ===
Written in 2000, this book covers Muhammad Ali's long battle against the US government over his stand against the Vietnam War. Ali wrote the foreword. In 2013, the book was adapted into a movie directed by two-time Oscar nominee Stephen Frears, starring Danny Glover, Christopher Plummer and Frank Langella. The film premiered at the Cannes Film Festival on May 23, 2013.

== Film ==
Since 2009, Wallace has written video description for AMI-TV, the world's first television network serving blind and visually impaired people. He is also a documentary filmmaker whose first film, Too Colorful for the League, about the history of racism in hockey for CBC TV, was nominated for a Gemini Award. The film documents a crusade to enshrine the black superstar Herb Carnegie into the Hockey Hall of Fame. Wallace has also contributed to the BBC and the Sunday New York Times. His second film, Schmelvis,( featuring singer songwriter Dan Hartal ) about the Jewish roots of Elvis Presley, had a US theatrical release and played in more than 75 film festivals around the world. In the 1990s, Wallace was the director and co-founder of both the Ottawa Folk Festival and the Ottawa International Busker Festival when employed as station manager for CKCU-FM, Canada's largest community radio station.

== Holocaust historian ==
Wallace is a former Executive Director of the Anne and Max Bailey Centre for Holocaust studies in Montreal, Quebec, Canada. During the 1990s, he worked for several years with Steven Spielberg's Shoah Foundation, recording the video testimonies of Holocaust survivors. For more than a decade, he has been researching Holocaust-era rescue operations and secret negotiations with high level Nazis during the waning days of the Second World War II to prevent the annihilation of the remaining Jews in Europe.

== Published works ==
- After the Miracle: The Political Crusades of Helen Keller (Grand Central Publishing, 2023)
- In the Name of Humanity: The Secret Deal to End the Holocaust (Penguin/Random House Canada and Skyhorse USA, 2018)
- The American Axis: Ford, Lindbergh, and the Rise of the Third Reich (St. Martin's Press, 2003)
- Who Killed Kurt Cobain? with Ian Halperin in 1998
- Muhammad Ali's Greatest Fight: Cassius Clay vs. the United States of America (M. Evans & Co., 2000)
- Love & Death: The Murder of Kurt Cobain with Ian Halperin (Simon & Schuster, 2004)

== Awards ==
- 1985: Shared the Rolling Stone Magazine Award for Investigative Journalism.
- 2001: Nominated for a Gemini Award for writing and producing CBC TV documentary Too Colourful For the League.
- 2018: Shortlisted for 2018 Vine Award for Canadian Jewish Literature (History Writing) for In the Name of Humanity
- 2018: Won the 2018 Canadian Jewish Literature Award (Holocaust Literature Category) for In the Name of Humanity
- 2009: Won the David Suzuki Foundation's "David Suzuki Digs My Garden" contest for best organic ornamental garden in Canada.
