= Soaked in Bleach =

2015 American docudrama directed by Benjamin Statler

- Theatrical release poster
- Directed by: Benjamin Statler
- Written by: Donnie Eichar; Richard Middleton; Benjamin Statler
- Produced by: Donnie Eichar; Richard Middleton; Benjamin Statler
- Starring: Tyler Bryan; Daniel Roebuck; August Emerson; Sarah Scott; Jerry Hauck; Julie Lancaster; Cyril Wecht
- Cinematography: Ben Kutchins
- Edited by: Javier Alvarez; David Moritz
- Music by: Peter G. Adams
- Production companies: Suburban Hitchhiker; Daredevil Films
- Distributed by: Montani Productions
- Release date: June 11, 2015
- Running time: 89 minutes
- Country: United States
- Language: English

Soaked in Bleach is a 2015 American docudrama directed by Benjamin Statler, who co-wrote and produced it with Richard Middelton and Donnie Eichar. The film details the events leading up to the death of Kurt Cobain, as seen through the perspective of Tom Grant, the private detective who was hired by Courtney Love to find Cobain, shortly before his death in 1994. It also explores the theory that Cobain's death was not a suicide. The film stars Tyler Bryan as Cobain and Daniel Roebuck as Grant, with Sarah Scott portraying Courtney Love and August Emerson as Dylan Carlson.

== Synopsis ==
The film provides a look at inconsistencies in the death of Kurt Cobain, the lead singer of the American grunge band Nirvana, as seen through the perspective of former private investigator Tom Grant. In addition to the dramatization of Cobain's final days, the film combines documentary footage as well as interviews with people associated with the case such as former Seattle Police Chief Norm Stamper and the American forensic pathologist Cyril Wecht. Grant's own recorded conversations with key figures such as Rosemary Carroll (Cobain's and Love's attorney) and Dylan Carlson — who purchased the 20-gauge Remington Model 11 Sportsman shotgun police alleged was used in Cobain's shooting and subsequent death— are also prominently featured.

== Production ==
Soaked in Bleach marks the directorial debut of Benjamin Statler, who co-wrote and produced the films Act of Valor and Comic-Con Episode IV: A Fan's Hope. Regarding the film's title, Bleach is the name of the Nirvana debut album and "Soaked in Bleach" are lyrics from the Nirvana song "Come as You Are", which was the second single from Nirvana's second album Nevermind.

== Reception ==
The film has a 50/100 rating on Metacritic based on seven reviews. On Rotten Tomatoes, the film has a 30% rating based on 10 reviews with an average rating of 4.5/10. Dennis Harvey of Variety wrote that the film "may be TMI for those not already obsessed with all things Cobain", but it presents enough evidence to counter its dismissal as a conspiracy theory. Zack Sigel wrote for VH1 that the film presents "Flimsy evidence, personal agendas, and blatant disregard for facts". IndieWire's review claimed cinematographer Ben Kutchins "heavily studied David Fincher’s unsung procedural masterpiece" Zodiac, noting that the "testimonies [and] audio recordings made by Grant" were "dramatically recreated like a made-for-TV version [of Fincher’s film]."

== Controversy ==
Prior to the release of the docu drama, cold case homicide Detective Michael Ciesynski was instructed to look at the 35mm film photographs of the Kurt Cobain death scene as part of a re-examination, marking the 20th anniversary of the musician's passing. The Seattle Police Department released those photographs in March 2014. Ciesnyski told KIRO-TV that "the new work on the case turned up nothing to make him think Cobain's death was anything but what it was ruled to be in 1994 - a suicide". New images of the Remington shotgun were also released later in March 2016, refuting the claim made in the movie that the Seattle Police Department gave Courtney Love the shotgun for melting it down. A police report referred instead to other guns confiscated by the police.

On June 17, 2015, Deadline Hollywood and Stereogum reported that Courtney Love had sent cease and desist letters against theaters showing Soaked in Bleach claiming, "A false accusation of criminal behavior is defamatory … which entitles Ms. Cobain to both actual and presumed damages". The letter also states "We hereby demand again that you immediately cease any and all plans for exhibition or promotion of the film. If we do not hear from you within five days, we are required to immediately pursue all available civil legal remedies on behalf of our client against you." To date no lawsuit has been filed on Love's behalf. The producers of the film responded to the letters by stating, "Courtney Love's uninformed accusations and efforts to discredit the film are totally off base. Courtney Love and her lawyers clearly don't like that the film presents a compelling case for re-opening the investigation into Kurt's death. They should respect the First Amendment and let people decide for themselves."

John Fisk, paramedic for the Seattle Fire Department and first responder at the Kurt Cobain death scene in 1994, gave an interview to the Mercer Island Reporter on April 6, 2016, stating that "he reiterated to the Soaked in Bleach producers that he still believes the case remains a suicide."

On June 27, 2016, Vernon J. Geberth, former homicide detective of the New York City Police Department, who was among the experts interviewed in the docudrama, posted an article on his Practical Homicide Investigation website and Facebook page, stating that he "was not happy that the producers of Soaked in Bleach made it appear that he agreed with their homicide theory". He stated further that he "made it quite clear that he believed that Kurt Cobain took his own life and backed up his opinion with the facts that he had obtained from the Seattle Police Department's Homicide Division coupled with his own experience with suicide cases".

Carole Chaski, a forensic linguist, agreed with the official suicide verdict. She was as well among the experts shown in Soaked in Bleach. On October 9, 2017, she was interviewed at the NBC News affiliate House Of Mystery Radio Show, stating that her "results do not support the conspiracy theory that Courtney Love authored the bottom portion to make it look like a suicide note". She ran Kurt Cobain's suicide note through a computational software called SNARE (Suicide Note Assessment Review) and it was classified as a suicide note (the top portion and the bottom portion).

== See also ==
- Kurt & Courtney, 1998 documentary on the same subject.
