= Teen Spirit: The Stories Behind Every Nirvana Song =

1996 book

- First edition cover
- Author: Chuck Crisafulli
- Language: English
- Publisher: Omnibus Press
- Publication date: 1996
- Publication place: United Kingdom
- Pages: 128
- ISBN: 0711958092

Teen Spirit: The Stories Behind Every Nirvana Song, also known as Nirvana: The Stories Behind The Songs is a book written by Chuck Crisafulli about the American rock band Nirvana and which was published by Omnibus Press in 1996.

== Content ==
The book tells the stories and meaning behind every song on the Nirvana albums Bleach (1989), Nevermind (1991), Incesticide (1992), In Utero (1993), and MTV Unplugged in New York (1994). This includes a chapter on the Nevermind hidden track, "Endless, Nameless" even though it is not listed in the contents of the book. The book also includes an interview Crisafulli did in February 1994 with Nirvana band leader Kurt Cobain who died in April 1994. It also includes a chronology of the band's history as well as the band's discography of albums and singles released in the US and UK, with the most recent release included being the 1996 live album From the Muddy Banks of the Wishkah, as well as a list of the band's compilation appearances and related recordings.

== Reception ==
Goodreads rated it 3.55 stars out of 5 from 114 ratings and twelve reviews. The StoryGraph gave it an average rating of 3.83.

== See also ==
- Come as You Are: The Story of Nirvana, 1993 book.
- Teen Spirit: The Tribute to Kurt Cobain, 1996 documentary.
- Who Killed Kurt Cobain?, 1998 book.
