= Hollywood Undercover =

2007 book by Ian Halperin

- Cover of the hardback first edition of Hollywood Undercover
- Author: Ian Halperin
- Language: English
- Subject: Hollywood
- Publisher: Mainstream Publishing
- Publication date: 2007
- Publication place: Scotland
- Media type: Print (Hardcover)
- Pages: 224
- ISBN: 978-1-84596-292-0
- OCLC: 183344042
- Dewey Decimal: 791.43'0979494 22
- LC Class: PN1993.5.U65 H27 2007
- Preceded by: Miss Supermodel America

Hollywood Undercover: Revealing the Sordid Secrets of Tinseltown is a non-fiction book about the culture of Hollywood society, written by investigative journalist and author Ian Halperin. Halperin poses as a gay man trying to become a successful actor in Hollywood, and informs individuals he is from the non-existent "Israeli royal family". He investigates rumors that the Church of Scientology reportedly claims to have a "cure" for homosexuality through "auditing", and speaks with a former Scientologist about his experiences. He also explores the casting couch phenomenon, the pornography industry, and the Oscars. Halperin meets with famous actors and celebrities, successfully obtains a talent agent, and a role in the film The Aviator.

The book was published in 2007 in the United Kingdom by Mainstream Publishing, and on January 15, 2008, in the United States. Hollywood Undercover received generally positive reviews in The Herald, New York Daily News, The Saturday Star, and Contactmusic.com; and a critical review in The Independent. Halperin later released a documentary film on the same topic, His Highness Hollywood, which premiered in New York City in April 2008. His Highness Hollywood is a companion documentary to the book.

== Contents ==
Halperin pretends to be an individual trying to become a successful actor in Los Angeles, and gains access to exclusive celebrity parties. He informs individuals in the entertainment industry that he is a "member of the Israeli royal family" (which does not exist).

The book takes a critical look at the Church of Scientology and its influence in Hollywood. Halperin posed as a gay man looking for a "cure" for homosexuality from Scientology in order to expose what he felt were inherent prejudices in the organization. He investigates rumors that Scientology claims to have a cure for homosexuality through a special "auditing" process. Halperin interviews former Scientologist Michael Pattinson, who sued the Church of Scientology claiming fraudulent activities after spending US$500,000 over 18 years in attempts to cure his homosexuality.

Halperin states that he told a Scientology official he wanted to have a successful career in Hollywood but was afraid that if his homosexuality was revealed it would stymie his career. He states that the Scientology official said Scientology would "cure him of his sexuality through auditing". According to Halperin the Church has arranged "cover" marriages as part of a "cure" for homosexuality, and notes that actor and Scientologist John Travolta married Kelly Preston two days after a male porn star told the National Enquirer of an alleged relationship he had with Travolta. According to Halperin, bisexual Anna Nicole Smith had wanted to become a Scientologist, but decided against it after she was informed by a friend of the organization's stance on homosexuality. After her death, Halperin claimed he and Smith ended up having sex in front of Marilyn Monroe's grave.

Halperin concludes that the Church of Scientology is more focused on money than on other issues: "I pretty much found that everything about the church is about making as much money as possible, which doesn't really make them much different from most other religions. I have to be honest and admit I also met some nice people in the church. It's just that I have a huge problem with their discriminatory attitude toward gays." Halperin disputes Andrew Morton's claim in his book Tom Cruise: An Unauthorized Biography that actor Tom Cruise is second in command of the organization, instead asserting Cruise is actually in the top position of leadership.

Halperin also explores the pornography industry, the Oscars, and the travails of the casting couch phenomenon. Links to YouTube videos by Halperin are given throughout the book, to illustrate encounters he had with various entertainment personalities. Halperin meets with famous actors and celebrities including Barbra Streisand, George Clooney and Leonardo DiCaprio, and asks them to share their advice with him about the workings of the entertainment industry. Halperin eventually lands a talent agent, and a role in the film The Aviator.

== Reception ==
Cheryl Caira, Rosemary Goring and Anne Johnstone reviewed the book for The Herald, and describe Halperin's experiences in the book as "certainly entertaining, and at times scandalous". Ben Widdicombe of New York Daily News notes Halperin "received the most offensive response imaginable" when he asked a Scientology official who Scientology founder L. Ron Hubbard would have voted for in the 2008 United States presidential election; according to Halperin, he asserted he spoke with a recruiter for Scientology, "He said, 'I can tell you who shouldn't be President - Barack Obama, Condoleezza Rice and the Rev. Al Sharpton. They should not be allowed to run for office, they should be sweeping the office.'" A review of the book in The Independent comments that the YouTube links provided throughout the book "have the effect of making virtually everyone who tries to help him seem nice while presenting Halperin as an unscrupulous creep".

In a review in The Saturday Star, Angelique Serrao writes that Halperin "interviews insiders who spill scandalous information that will leave you gasping at the audacity of the movie world". Adam Adshead of Contactmusic.com writes: "Hollywood undercover is a candid and intelligent look at the fame game from an insider's point of view." Marc Weisblott reviewed the book for Eye Weekly, and comments: "Cynical reporting about the Hollywood system isn't hard to come by, but Halperin has the audacity to get involved with his subjects, attracting empathy even while claiming that he's a royal scion craving fame that his homeland cannot facilitate."

== See also ==
- Cinema of the United States
- Hollywood, Interrupted
- Homosexuality and Scientology
- Investigative journalism
