= Gone Too Soon (film) =

2010 film by Ian Halperin

- Directed by: Ian Halperin
- Produced by: Ian Halperin
- Distributed by: Shine International
- Release date: June 25, 2010
- Running time: 88 minutes
- Language: English

Gone Too Soon is a documentary film about the final year of Michael Jackson's life and career. It first aired on the TV Guide Network on June 25, 2010, exactly one year after Jackson's death.

The documentary was produced and directed by author-filmmaker Ian Halperin, who wrote "Unmasked: The Final Years of Michael Jackson", which hit No. 1 the New York Times' bestsellers list in 2009, after he spent five years investigating Jackson. In an interview with Halperin in March 2010, he revealed that the film is culled from 300 hours of footage shot inside the singer's camp and includes video and audio of Jackson shot before his death. It also includes interviews with Jackson's personal manager, trainer, and attorney.

According to the filmmakers, Jackson family members were not involved but are aware of the film. Former family attorney Brian Oxman is among the interviewees. The movie is claimed to depict the more scandalous aspects of Jackson's life.
