= Donnie Eichar =

American film director

- Born: Florida
- Occupations: Author and film producer
- Known for: Dead Mountain (book)

Donnie Eichar is an American film producer, director and author. He wrote the book Dead Mountain: The Untold True Story of the Dyatlov Pass Incident in 2013. He is also known for producing the TV series Killing Fields, the documentary film Soaked in Bleach, and the TV series The Buried Life.

== Early life ==
Eichar grew up in Indian Rocks Beach, Florida, before moving to Hollywood to pursue a career in the film industry.

== Film career ==
Eichar starred in the first vampire movie The brotherhood.

His directorial career began with shooting documentary films. His first being the 2003 documentary, Blind Faith, which premiered at the Seattle International Film Festival. He released his second documentary in 2006, Seeing With Sound, which won a silver award at The Telly Awards in 2007. In 2008, he wrote and directed a third documentary on blindness, which was titled Victory Over Darkness. It premiered at the Heartland film festival.

In 2006, Eichar was a director, writer, and producer for The Dangerous Sports Club, The Bug Wrangler, Dan Eldon Lives and Queen of Scream. All four films aired on Current TV.

In 2010, Eichar began working for MTV as a producer for the documentary series The Buried Life. The show received two nominations for VH1's Do Something Awards. Eichar served as a producer on the show for two seasons.

Following the release of his first book, it was announced by Variety that the book would be turned into a movie. The movie has not been made as of 2024.

In 2015, Eichar produced and wrote the documentary film Soaked in Bleach, which studied the events preceding and surrounding the death of Kurt Cobain as seen through the perspective of private investigator Tom Grant. The film controversially explored the premise that Kurt Cobain's death was not a suicide. Soaked in Bleach had a limited theatrical release, despite statements that Courtney Love attempted to thwart the film release with cease and desist orders sent to all the theatres slated to show the film. The film was also distributed by Netflix after its limited theatrical release.

In 2015, Eichar was the Executive Producer for Discovery Channel's true crime show, The Killing Fields. It explored the unsolved murder case of Louisiana State University graduate student, Eugenie Boisfontaine of Iberville Parish, Louisiana. In the premiere season, the original detective assigned to the case over 20 years ago gets reinstated to solve his decades-old cold case using modern technology. Deadline announced that 2.4 million viewers viewed the season finale. The Killing Fields received an 80% favorable reviews on Rotten Tomatoes. The Los Angeles Times reviewed the first season as, 'It's the smaller, unvarnished, passing moments that sell the show – where its particular poetry, and even its comedy, can be found. The New York Times also gave the show a favorable review.

Eichar was also the creator, executive producer, and writer for a LMN Network pilot titled, The Body Detective. The show was based around renowned American forensic Pathologist Dr. Cyril Wecht's views of a 1997 murder case in which his findings was able to overturn the case from accidental death to murder.

Eichar was a show runner and executive producer of People Magazine Investigates, a 10-part one-hour weekly true crime series focusing on the stories behind headlines. The two-hour, two-part opener focused on the Long Island serial killer case. When it premiered on Investigation Discovery in November 2016, it reached 4 million viewers.

== Dead Mountain ==
Dead Mountain is the first published book by Eichar. The book is an investigative story based on the events that took place at the Dyatlov Pass incident in 1959. Eichar came across the story while carrying out research for an unrelated project. Eichar initially had plans to make a documentary but after traveling to Yekaterinburg for research he decided to author a book instead. After securing a book deal with Chronicle Books, Eichar made a second trip to the location of the incident in the Russian Ural Mountains, uncovering what he claimed was new evidence.

Eichar retraced the steps of the nine Russian hikers to try and reach a conclusion as to why the men and women had died, or what had killed them. His investigation was written into the book, Dead Mountain: The Untold True Story of the Dyatlov Pass Incident, and was released in 2013. The book received mainly positive reviews following its release.

Later in 2013, Eichar was invited to Google to present and answer questions as part of an at GoogleTalks episode. He was also a guest on Coast to Coast AM and was interviewed by George Noory on the subject. In 2014, he was interviewed by National Geographic about Dead Mountain and the evidence that he found.

The New York Times listed Dead Mountain as one of their best sellers in April 2015.

== Personal life ==
Eichar lives in Malibu, California with his wife Julia Ortiz.
