= Who Killed Kurt Cobain? =

1998 book by Ian Halperin and Max Wallace

Who Killed Kurt Cobain?: The Mysterious Death of an Icon
- First edition cover
- Author: Ian Halperin and Max Wallace
- Language: English
- Publisher: Birch Lane Press
- Publication date: 1998 (first edition) 2000 (second edition)
- Publication place: United States
- Media type: Print (paperback and hardcover)
- Pages: 214 (first edition) 248 (second edition)
- ISBN: 978-1559724463
- Followed by: Love and Death

Who Killed Kurt Cobain?: The Mysterious Death of an Icon is a 1998 book that explores the premise that the death of Kurt Cobain, frontman of American rock band Nirvana, was a case of murder and not suicide. It is a collaborative investigative journalism book written by Ian Halperin and Max Wallace. It went on to be an international bestseller.

== Premise ==
The book explores the theory that Cobain's wife, Courtney Love, had been involved in his death and that he died of a heroin overdose before being shot, contrary to the official police report that he died from a self-inflicted gunshot wound. The authors present evidence from Tom Grant who was the private detective initially hired by Love to monitor Cobain, as well as a man named El Duce who claims he was hired to kill Cobain. The latter claimed that he was offered $50,000 to kill Cobain and allegedly passed a lie detector test in this statement that was carried out by the world's top polygraphist. The second edition of the book, released in 2000, also details how Love tried to stop the book being released as well as trying to stop the 1998 documentary, Kurt & Courtney, from being released which also explores the possibility that Cobain's death was murder, not suicide.

In an interview with The New York Times, author Ian Halperin said that he had received a lot more than just letters trying to deter him from writing the book, and that "I've been dogged for two years" and that "I've had private investigators follow me. They've showed up in my back yard and broken into and ransacked my home. I couldn't be bought or shut up".

== Reception ==
The book was an international bestseller. A brief but negative review by British newspaper The Independent stated that "Speaking of tragedies, Who Killed Kurt Cobain? by Ian Halperin and Max Wallace, reveals the shocking truth that the Nirvana singer's middle name was Donald. Oh, they also conclude that he might have been murdered and that Courtney Love might know who did it (so that's saved you reading the thing)". In a review by Deseret News the book is described as having a patchwork of evidence assembled by the authors which "suggests" but does not state "otherwise", and that the book is simply about suspicion, implication and possibility.

== Sequel ==
The authors later published a sequel book, Love and Death in 2004.
