= Steve Broy =

American musician

- Also known as: Dr. Heathen Scum, Pope Heathen Scum
- Born: April 1, 1958 (age 68)
- Origin: Seattle, Washington, United States
- Genres: Heavy metal, punk rock
- Instruments: Electric bass, guitar
- Years active: 1976–present

Steve Broy (born April 1, 1958), also known by the stage names Dr. Heathen Scum and Pope Heathen Scum, is an American musician, best known as a founding member and current bassist of the heavy metal band Mentors. Broy has also collaborated in related bands and released solo records under the Dr. Heathen Scum moniker.

== Career ==
As a teenager, Broy co-founded the Mentors in Seattle, Washington, in 1976 with two classmates at Roosevelt High School, guitarist Eric Carlson (Sickie Wifebeater), and drummer/vocalist Eldon Hoke (El Duce). The band later relocated to Los Angeles, California, and gained extensive notoriety for their extreme shock rock aesthetic.

Broy was in and out of Mentors during their early career due to his preoccupation with pursuing degrees in engineering. His replacement, Mike Dewey, also used the Dr. Heathen Scum moniker during his time with the band, causing confusion regarding contribution credits. Broy returned to the bass in 1985 when The Mentors signed to Death Records, a subsidiary of Metal Blade, and released their debut studio LP, You Axed For It!. Thereafter, Broy was briefly replaced by bassists Ed Danky ("Poppa Sneaky Spermshooter") and Zippy, but returned to the group in 1989. The band continued after Hoke's 1997 death and presently remain active, with Broy often acting as the group's unofficial spokesman. As of Carlson's death in December 2024, Broy is the only surviving member of the You Axed for It! lineup.

Broy has also performed as Dr. Heathen Scum with Hoke on his solo albums, collaborated with many groups, and has made solo albums as Dr. Heathen Scum and Pope Heathen Scum. According to Broy, his band Church of El Duce was formed "immediately after the resurrection of our Lord, El Duce" and Hoke came to him in a dream, telling him to "keep rockin'".

== Discography ==
=== With The Mentors ===
- Get Up and Die (1981 Mystic Records)
- You Axed for It! (1985 Metal Blade/Death Records)
- Up the Dose (1986 Metal Blade/Death Records)
- Rock Bible (1990 Mentor Records)
- To the Max (1991 Mentor Records)
- Over the Top (2005 Mentor Records)
- Ducefixion (2009 Mentor Records)

=== With The Mantors ===
- Lust Muscle (2008 Mad Dog/Mentors Records)
- Matando Emo (2009 Mad Dog/Mentors Records)

=== With El Duce ===
- Musical Pornography (1993 Mind Boggler Records)

=== With Hammerhawk / Mentorhawk ===
- Motel 7 (2000 HMF Records)

=== As Pope Heathen Scum ===
- Lady Killer (2008 Mind Boggler Records)
- Top Notch Rock (2010 Mentors Records)

=== As Dr. Heathen Scum with Hammergirl ===
- Songs of Sex and Love (2009 Mind Boggler Records)

=== With Church of El Duce ===
- The Devils Hand (2005 Usmetal Records)

=== With Mentor Heathen Scum's Church of El Duce ===
- Not Suitable For Anyone (2006 Usmetal Records)
- Ladies Man (2006 Usmetal Records)

=== With Kill Allen Wrench ===
- My Bitch Is A Junky (1998 Wanker Records)
- Full Metal Messiah (2002 Devil Vision Motion Picture Company Records)

== Videography ==
- Get Up and Die (1983)
- Mentors Fuck Movie (1987)
- A Piece of Sinema (1990)
- The Wretched World of The Mentors (1990)
- Mentors Tour De Max '91 (1991)
- El Duce, The Man. The Myth. The Video. (1993)
- Mentors – El Duce Vita DVD (2007)
- The Mentors: Kings of Sleaze Rockumentary (2018)
