= Tsatsa (votive offering) =

Tibetan clay votive plaques

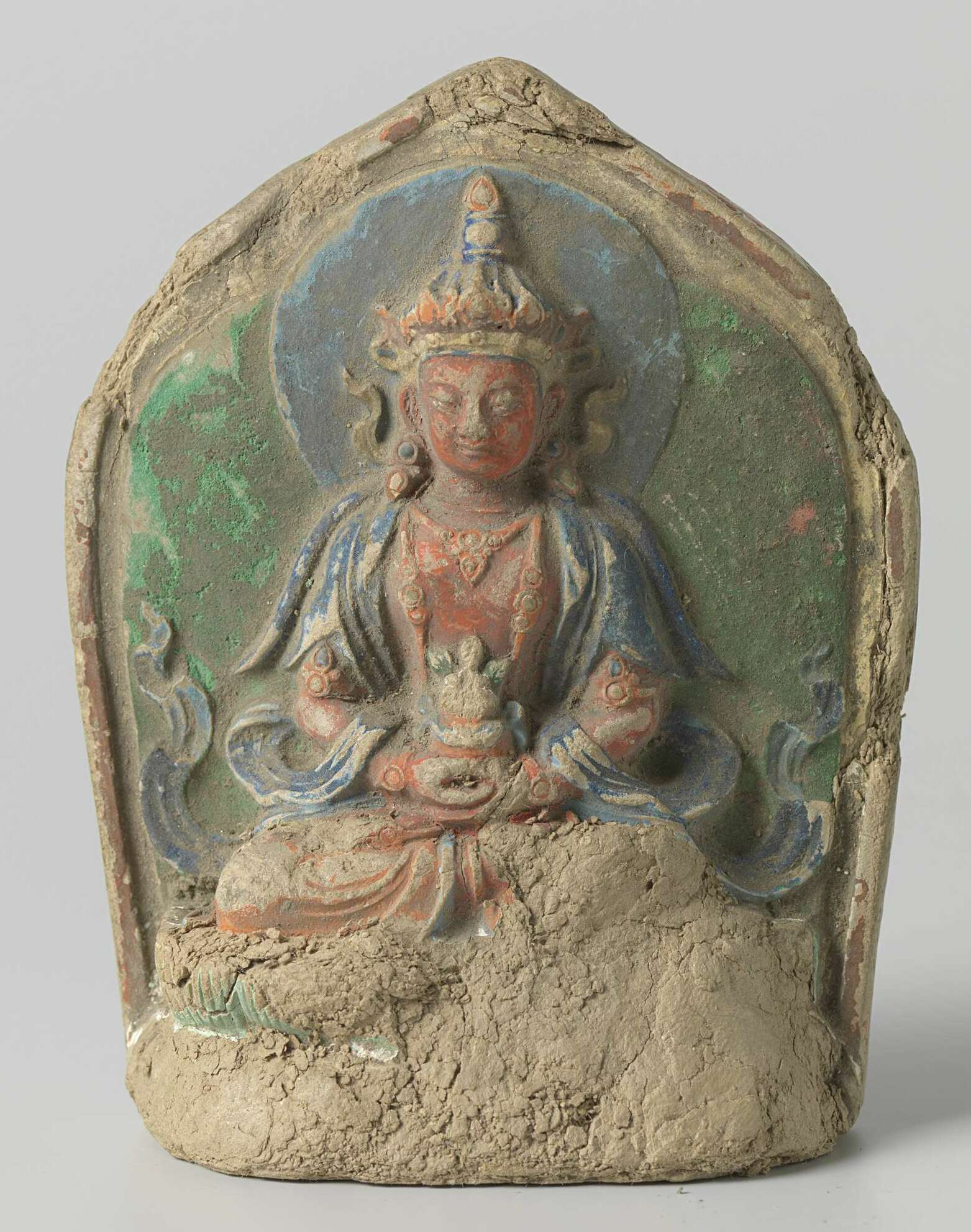
Amitayus, Tibet, 18th-century, in pressed loam

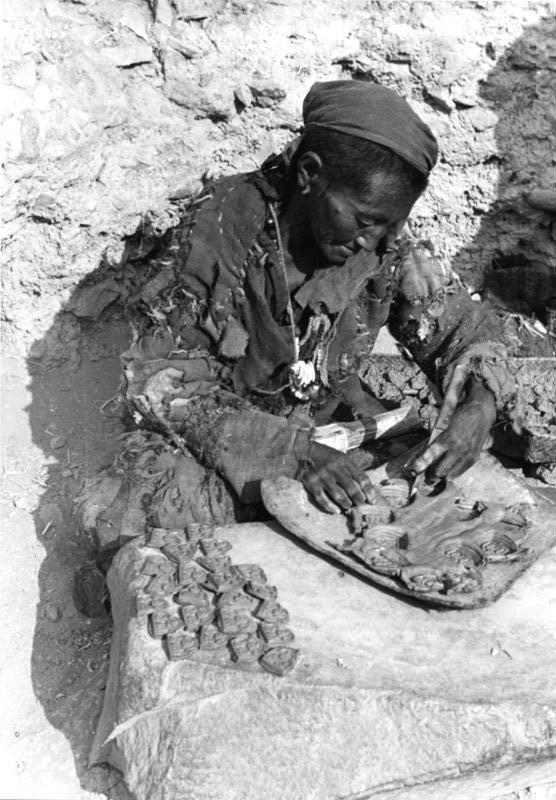
A monk making tsatsas (1938).

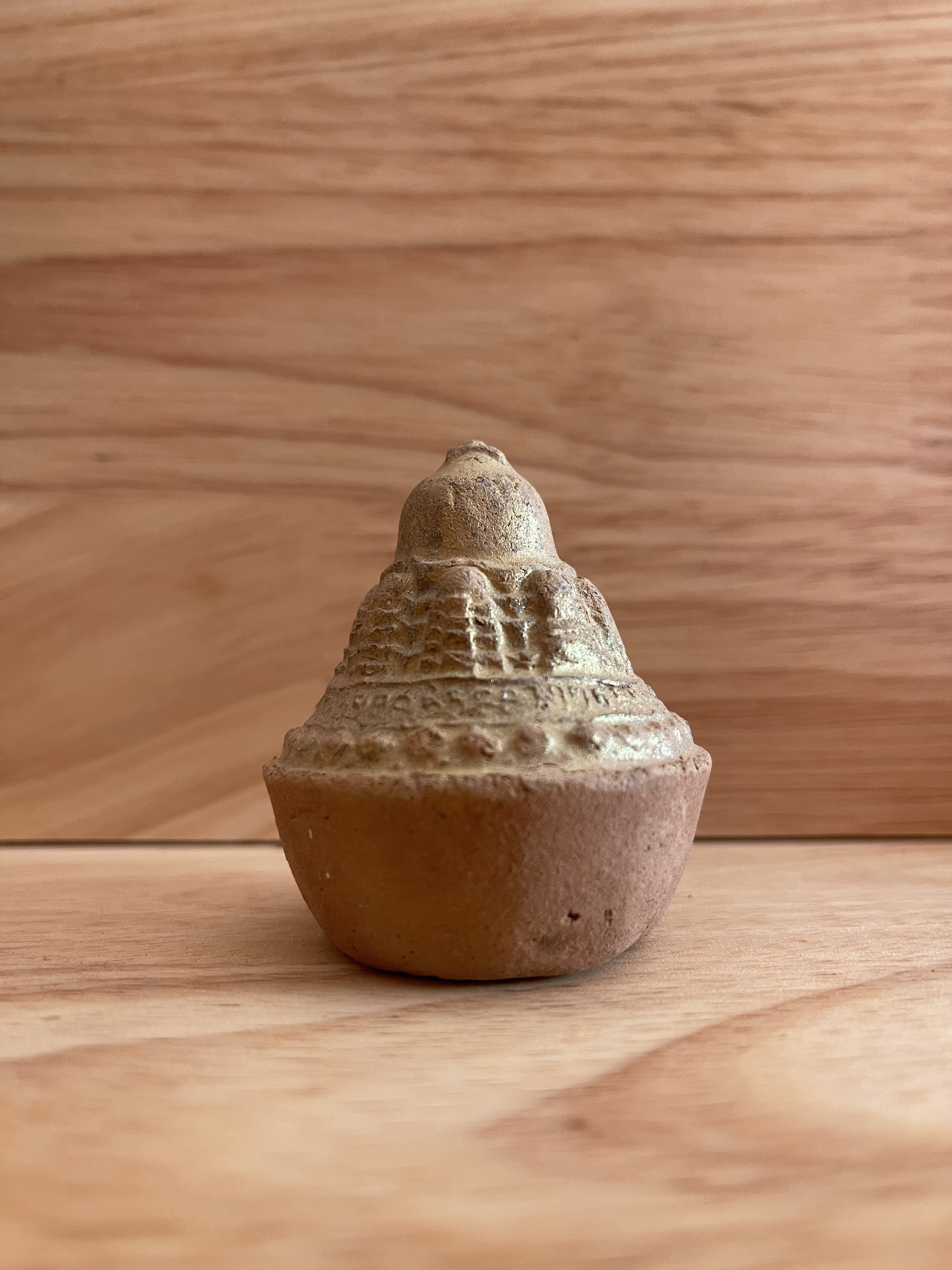
Buddhist Tsatsa

Tsatsa (also tsa-tsa, tsha-tsha, ཚ་ཚ) is a small sculptural votive offering used in Tibetan Buddhism. They are usually small plaques with decoration in relief, made in moulds with clay or rammed earth, but sometimes other materials such as metal may be used. They descend from similar Indian plaques made for pilgrims to Buddhist pilgrimage sites such as Bodh Gaya.

In Bhutan, the usual shape is a small chorten or stupa, also sometimes seen in Tibet, where it has a special funerary form.

== Use ==
Tsatsas often depict figures such as the Buddha, deities, religious teachers or shrines. There may also be inscriptions, sacred syllables, or longer mantras. They are commonly left as votive offerings at special places, such as in caves considered to be holy, or deposited as consecration fillings inside stupas.

Tsatsas are also often produced for special occasions such as birthdays of important religious figures or to commemorate their visit - examples might include a well-known lama.

== Production ==
Most tsatsas are made of clay, although offerings in the form of tsatsas are occasionally made out of metal or more valuable substances. To clay or loam, water and plant fibres might be added to create a malleable mass. The ashes of deceased spiritual teachers (after their cremation) might be added to the clay in small quantities to produce 'blessed' tsatsas as a memorial to the teacher and to retain their presence. Moulds are carved into wood or metal and used to press the clay. After drying or firing in an oven - both unfired and fired tsatsas can be found, the votives might be varnished, engraved, inscribed and/or painted. During the production, mantras are recited. Producing tsatsas is seen as a way to accumulate merit, or good karma, and thus as a viable way to progress along the path of liberation in Buddhism.
