= Anne and Max Bailey Centre =

The Anne and Max Bailey Centre (Centre Anne et Max Bailey) is a Quebec-based non-profit organization continuing the legacy of two prominent Montreal human rights activists, Anne G. Bailey, a prominent Montreal human rights advocate, and Max Bailey, who served as a left-wing Montreal City councillor from 1947 to 1950 and was president of the United Jewish People's Order, Montreal. Max Bailey spearheaded a test case, Switzman v. Elbling, which resulted in the Canadian Supreme Court striking down the Padlock Law in 1957. The Anne G. Bailey Residence at Hillel Montreal is named after Anne

The Anne and Max Bailey Centre for Holocaust Studies funded research into various aspects of the Holocaust and brought in prominent speakers such as Nazi-hunter Beate Klarsfeld and Edwin Black, author of the bestseller, IBM and the Holocaust.

The Anne and Max Bailey Centre for Environmental Studies promoted environmental activism and research, particularly around the harmful effects of pesticides.
