= Love and Death (2004 book) =

Book about the Death of Kurt Cobain

Love and Death: The Murder of Kurt Cobain
- First edition hard cover
- Author: Ian Halperin and Max Wallace
- Language: English
- Publisher: Simon & Schuster
- Publication date: 2004 hardcover, 2005 paperback
- Publication place: United States
- Media type: Print (paperback and hardcover)
- Pages: 304 (hardcover); 288 (paperback)
- ISBN: 978-0743484831
- Preceded by: Who Killed Kurt Cobain?
- Followed by: Case Closed: The Cobain Murder: The Killing And Cover Up of Kurt Cobain (Controversy: Sex, Lies and Dirty Money By The World's Powerful Elite)

Love and Death: The Murder of Kurt Cobain, published by Simon & Schuster, is a collaborative investigative journalism book written by Ian Halperin and Max Wallace purporting to show that Nirvana lead singer and guitarist Kurt Cobain, believed to have committed suicide, was in fact murdered, possibly at the behest of his wife Courtney Love. It is a follow-up to the authors' 1998 bestseller on the same subject, Who Killed Kurt Cobain?. The book is based on 30 hours of audiotaped conversations, exclusively obtained by the authors, between Courtney Love's private investigator, Tom Grant, and her and Cobain's entertainment attorney, Rosemary Carroll, who both dispute the official finding of suicide and believe Cobain was in fact murdered.

Rosemary Carroll says on the tapes that she believes the suicide note was "forged or traced". The authors also interview Cobain's grandfather, who believes Kurt was the victim of foul play, and Courtney's father, who also believes he was murdered. In the book, a prominent forensic pathologist examines the known autopsy evidence and claims that the official suicide scenario was "impossible." She claims that there is compelling and authoritative evidence that Cobain was murdered.

== Reception ==
Love and Death reached No. 18 on The New York Times Bestseller list in April 2004. Shortly after the book's release, the television show Dateline NBC aired a segment critically examining some of the book's conclusions. British newspaper The Guardian described the book as "opportunistic, plain wrong or not, this book is valuably different in tone to everything else you'll read on the subject this week."

== Sequel ==
A sequel book, Case Closed: The Cobain Murder: The Killing And Cover Up of Kurt Cobain (Controversy: Sex, Lies and Dirty Money By The World's Powerful Elite) was published in March 2023.
