= Shock rock =

Music genre

- Other names: Horror rock
- Stylistic origins: Rock; cabaret; hard rock; heavy metal; punk rock; horror fiction; glam rock; science fiction; shock value
- Cultural origins: 1950s–1970s, United Kingdom and United States

Local scenes
- United Kingdom, United States

Other topics
- Glam punk; glam metal; gothic rock

Shock rock (also known as horror rock) is a subgenre of rock music which primarily focuses on highly theatrical live performances emphasizing shock value. The term was originally coined in December 1966 by journalist Robert Shelton to describe Frank Zappa and his group the Mothers of Invention. However, the phrase was later popularized during the late 1960s and early 1970s to refer to acts such as Arthur Brown, Alice Cooper and Iggy Pop. Artists such as Screamin' Jay Hawkins and Screaming Lord Sutch were later regarded as precursors and influences to the genre. By the 1990s and 2000s, "shock rock" was used as a term to describe Marilyn Manson.

Performances may include violent or provocative behavior from the artists, the use of attention-grabbing imagery such as costumes, masks, or face paint, or special effects such as pyrotechnics or fake blood. Shock rock also often includes elements of horror.

== Etymology ==
On December 25, 1966, The New York Times published an article entitled Shock Rock: Take Musical Satire One Step Further by journalist Robert Shelton. In the article, Shelton would coin the term "shock rock" to describe musician Frank Zappa and his group the Mothers of Invention, he stated:

The Mothers of Invention are primarily musical satirists. Beyond that, they are perhaps the first pop group to successfully amalgamate rock 'n' roll with the serious music of Stravinsky and others. Both in their material and in their looks, they are also furthering some of the more outrageous elements of anti-convention, thus contributing to a new style that might be called "shock-rock."

== History ==
=== Influences and precursors ===
Screamin' Jay Hawkins has been seen as a pioneer for shock rock. After the success of his 1956 hit "I Put a Spell on You", Hawkins began to perform a recurring stunt at many of his live shows: he would emerge from a coffin, sing into a skull-shaped microphone and set off smoke bombs. Another artist who performed similar stunts was the British singer-songwriter Screaming Lord Sutch.

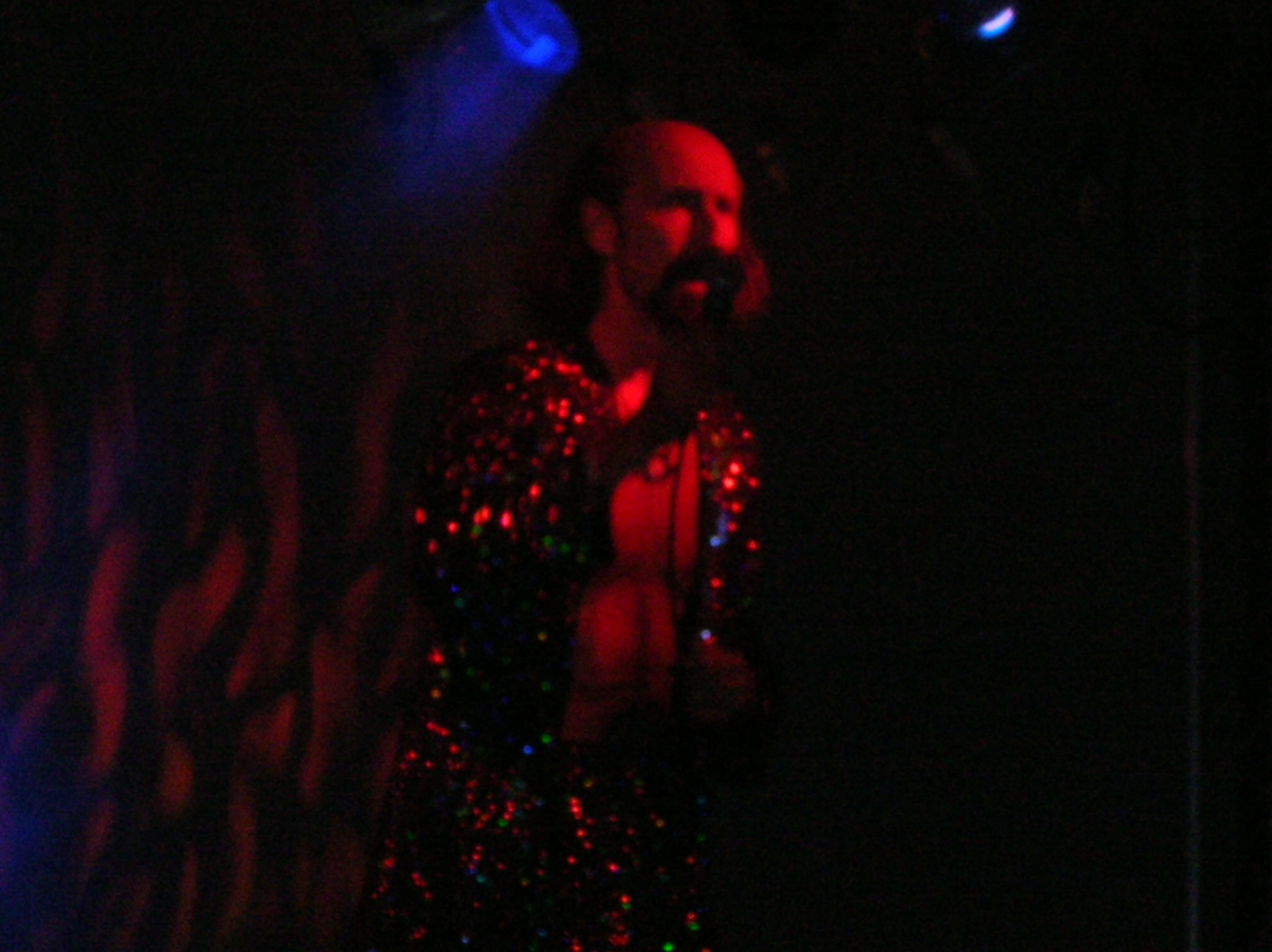
Arthur Brown in 2005. During live performances and in the promotional television video, Brown performed the 1968 song "Fire" wearing black and white makeup (corpse paint) and a burning headpiece.

=== 1960s–1970s: Origins ===
The 1960s brought several proto-shock-rock artists. The term was originally coined to describe the music of Frank Zappa and his group the Mothers of Invention. In England, the Who often destroyed their instruments, the Move did the same to television sets, and Arthur Brown wore vivid makeup and a flaming headpiece. In the US, Jimi Hendrix set his guitar alight at the Monterey Pop Festival in 1967. Detroit musician Iggy Pop of the Stooges adopted a violent, erratic onstage persona which drew influence from Jim Morrison of the Doors. Pop would often throw his body around the stage and was known to wear a dog collar during some performances, along with arm length silver lamé gloves, exemplifying both shock and glam rock sensibilities. At one show in 1970, Pop smeared peanut butter on his body and threw it into the crowd. In 1973, Pop committed self-mutilation on stage with a knife and at a later show exposed himself.

About seeing Arthur Brown, Alice Cooper, often called "The Godfather of Shock Rock", stated: "Can you imagine the young Alice Cooper watching that with all his make-up and hellish performance? It was like all my Halloweens came at once!"

=== 1980s–2000s: Popularity ===
Subsequently, Roky Erickson coined the term "horror rock" in 1980, when describing the music of his band Roky Erickson and the Aliens, whose music influenced by horror movies was retroactively noted by Compass News, as influential to the development of shock rock.

The Plasmatics were an American punk rock band formed by Yale University art school graduate Rod Swenson with Wendy O. Williams. The band was a controversial group known for wild live shows. In addition to chainsawing guitars, blowing up speaker cabinets and sledgehammering television sets, Williams and the Plasmatics blew up automobiles live on stage. Williams was arrested in Milwaukee by the Milwaukee police before being charged with public indecency. Jim Farber of Sounds described the show: "Lead singer/ex-porn star/current weight lifter Wendy Orleans Williams (W.O.W. for short) spends most of the Plasmatics' show fondling her family size breasts, scratching her sweaty snatch and eating the drum kit, among other playful events".

In the 1980s in Richmond, Virginia, Gwar formed as a collaboration of artists and musicians, and since 2024, has been touring consistently for over forty years. The band members make their own lavish monster costumes, which they claim are inspired by many of the creatures from H. P. Lovecraft's literary multiverse, the Cthulhu Mythos. Gwar frequently incorporates extravagant theatrics into their shows, such as mock jousts and pretending to murder each other.

The Mentors cultivated a shock-rock image by wearing executioners' hoods in concert and making deliberately outlandish statements to the press. In the 1990s, vocalist Eldon Hoke also began incorporating onstage sex acts into the band's repertoire.

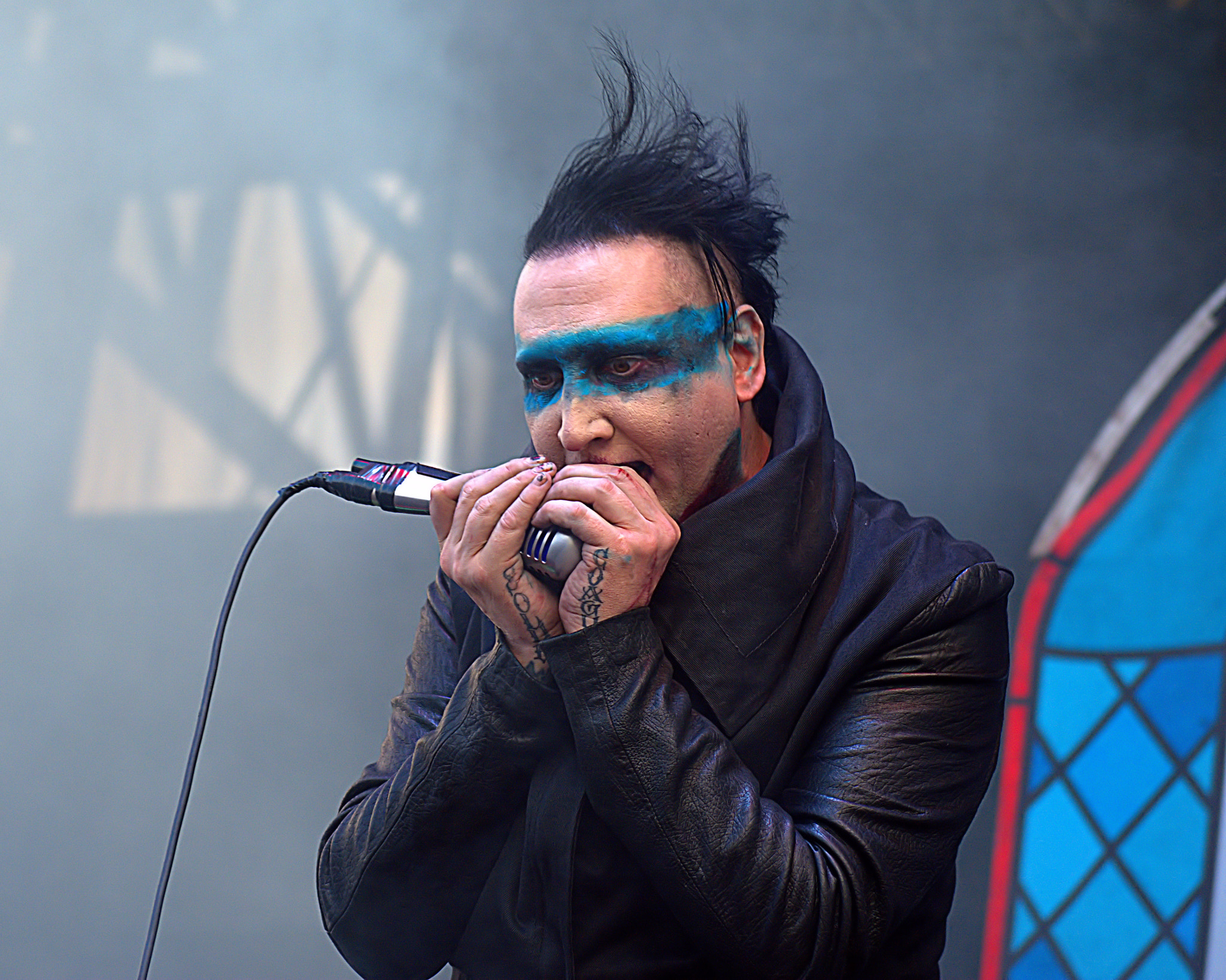
Marilyn Manson has widely been described as a shock rocker.

In the 1990s and 2000s, Marilyn Manson became perhaps the most notable and well known act in shock rock. His band was once dubbed by former US Senator Joseph Lieberman (D-Conn) as "perhaps the sickest group ever promoted by a mainstream record company." Manson's stage antics, such as burning the American flag and ripping pages out of the Bible, have been the focus of protests throughout his career. Manson argued that every artist has their means of presentation and that his visual and vocal styles are merely a way for him to control the angle that his audience and the general public view and interpret what he is trying to convey artistically.

== See also ==
- List of shock rock musicians
