= Mentors (band) =

American heavy metal band

- Origin: Seattle, Washington, U.S.
- Genres: Heavy metal, hard rock, punk rock, shock rock
- Years active: 1976–present (hiatus; 1997–2000)
- Labels: Mentor, Mystic, Metal Blade, Ever Rat
- Members: Steve Broy; Marc Mad Dog DeLeon; Cousin Fister; Paul Van Rijswijk; Manuel Galati
- Past members: Eldon Hoke; Jeff Dahl; Chris Jacobson; Wayne Daddio; Mike Dewey; Ed Danky; Lucinda Rezabek; Keith McAdam; Clark Savage; Jeff Solberg; Jake Huber; Eric Carlson
- Website: thementors.us Church of El Duce

The Mentors are an American heavy metal band, known for their deliberate shock rock lyrics. Originally formed in Seattle, Washington in May 1976, they relocated to Los Angeles, California in 1979.

The band garnered attention both from noted hard rock acts and pro-censorship movements such as the Parents Music Resource Center, but the death of drummer and lead singer Eldon Hoke ("El Duce") in 1997 brought them unprecedented attention.

== History ==
Founding members Eldon Hoke ("El Duce"), Eric Carlson ("Sickie Wifebeater") and Steve Broy ("Dr. Heathen Scum") attended Roosevelt High School together in Seattle, and began experimenting together with crude punk and primitive heavy metal. Upon formation, the Mentors began to tour the Northwest, playing shows with their trademark executioner hoods (it was the idea of El Duce, who adored a horror movie called Mark of the Devil) and bawdy lyrics. In the early days of the band, El Duce would contact venues saying they were a Kiss cover band and send them a dubbed cassette with Kiss songs on it and say it was them. On one occasion he sent a copy of Deep Purple's Live in Japan to what they thought was a club. It was later revealed to be a pizza place and they ended up playing a kid's birthday party. They were forced to stop after one song and were eventually given $50. Broy was in and out of the band during its early career due to his preoccupation with pursuing a degree in engineering. Other bassists from this era include Jeff Dahl, Chris Jacobsen (Jack Shit), and Mike Dewey (Heathen Scum Wezda).

Through Mystic Records, the Mentors released their first EP, The Trash Bag, in 1983. Their first live album, Live at the Whiskey/Cathey de Grande, came out the following year; both records were produced by Phillip (Philco) Raves. In 1985, they signed to Death Records, a subsidiary of Metal Blade, and released their debut studio LP, You Axed for It!, with Broy returning on the bass. During this time, Hoke maintained a strong public presence, making a controversial appearance alongside fellow metal band Gwar on The Jerry Springer Show, where Hoke's band, beliefs and public image were criticized.

The Mentors did not achieve true notoriety until the 1985 Congressional hearings orchestrated by Tipper Gore's Parents Music Resource Center (PMRC). The relatively obscure Mentors caught the attention of the PMRC with their song "Golden Shower", prompting a reading of some of its lyrics on the Congressional floor.

Broy was briefly replaced by bassists Wayne Daddio ("Ripper"), Ed Danky ("Poppa Sneaky Spermshooter"), Lucinda Rezabek ("Scum Bitch") and Keith McAdam ("Zippy"), but later returned to the group. In 1989, the Mentors released their third album, Sex, Drugs & Rock 'n' Roll, a faux-live record. This album caught the attention of the band Revolting Cocks, who invited the Mentors on tour with them.

They released Rock Bible in 1990, with Rick Lomas ("Insect On Acid") sitting in on drums. To the Max followed the next year. Clark Savage ("Moosedick") often filled in for Hoke on drums at live shows, as Hoke's alcoholism had made it difficult for him to play drums and sing simultaneously, eventually taking the position as drummer while Hoke became vocalist exclusively.

The Mentors remained sporadically active thereafter. Hoke began a solo career, while Carlson formed the band Jesters of Destiny. In 1997, while being interviewed for the documentary film Kurt and Courtney, Hoke claimed that Courtney Love had offered him $50,000 to kill her husband Kurt Cobain, whose death was ruled a suicide. Two days after being interviewed, Hoke died after being struck by a freight train while intoxicated. His death was alternately described as an accident and a suicide; however, some conspiracy theorists have claimed there is evidence suggesting foul play.

Carlson, Broy and Savage continued the band and were joined by guitarist Jeff Solberg ("Sickie J") and vocalist Jake Huber ("El Rapo"), releasing Over the Top in 2005. In 2006, singer and drummer Marc DeLeon ("Mad Dog"), of the Mentors tribute band the Mantors, replaced Huber and, later, Savage. Ducefixion, their eighth full-length record, was released in 2009. DeLeon left the Mentors in 2014 during the making of a full-length documentary film called The Mentors: Kings of Sleaze Rockumentary, directed by April Jones.

On May 25, 2017, the Mentors released The Illuminaughty, their first studio album in eight years, with Broy and Lomas sharing the vocal duties.

In 2019, a documentary about the band and Hoke, The El Duce Tapes, was released to the festival circuit, featuring unreleased interviews with Hoke from 1990-91 and discussing the Mentors in the context of modern-day cancel culture. The film was released on Blu-ray, streaming, and limited-edition VHS in 2020.

Carlson died from cancer on December 29, 2024 at the age of 66, leaving Broy as the only surviving member of the classic You Axed for It! lineup.

== Members ==
Current members

- Steve Broy (Dr. Heathen Scum) – bass (1976–1979, 1984–1986, 1989–present), lead vocals (2014–present)
- Rick Lomas (Insect On Acid) – keyboards (1989–1990, 2014–present), backing vocals (2014–present), drums (1989–1990)
- Cousin Fister – rhythm guitar (2014–present)
- Mad Dog – lead vocals, drums, guitar when Don Nutz is on drums (2006–present)
- Don Nutz – The Italian Stallion – drums for Europe and Long Us Tours (2015–present)
- Paul Van Rijswijk – lead guitar – for Europe (2009–present)

Former members

- Eric Carlson (Sickie Wifebeater) – lead guitars (1976–2024, died 2024)
- Eldon Hoke (El Duce) – drums, vocals (1976–1997; died 1997)
- Jeff Dahl – bass (1979–1980)
- Chris Jacobson (Jack Shit) – bass (1980; died 2011)
- Mike Dewey (Heathen Scum Wezda) – bass (1980–1984)
- Ed Danky (Poppa Sneaky Spermshooter) – bass (1986–1989; died 1990)
- Lucinda Rezabek (Scumbitch) – bass (1989)
- Keith McAdam (Zippy) – bass (1989)
- Clark Savage (Moosedick) – drums (1991–2008)
- Jeff Solberg (Sickie Jr.) – rhythm guitar (2001–2010)
- Jake Huber (El Rapo) – vocals (2001–2005; died 2020)
- Marc DeLeon (Mad Dog) – vocals (2005–2014), drums (2008–2014)
- John Christopher (El Chapo aka Viejo Malo) – drums (2014–2022)

== Discography ==
=== Singles/EPs ===
- Get Up and Die (1981, Mystic Records)
- Live in Frisco (1987, Mystic Records)
- Mentorhawk (split CD with Dutch Metal act Hammerhawk 1999, HMF Records)
- "Oblivion Train" (2009, Stool Sample Records)
- "Nuthang" (2018) (Recorded in 1977)
- "Baby You Will Regret Me" (2018)
- "Cornshucker" (2018) (New version)
- "I Am a Peeping Tom" (2018) (New version)

=== Live albums ===
- Live at the Whisky / Cathay De Grande (1983, Mystic)
- Sex, Drugs & Rock 'n' Roll (1989, Ever Rat Records)

=== Studio albums ===
- You Axed for It! (1985, Metal Blade/Death Records)
- Up the Dose (1986, Metal Blade/Death Records)
- Rock Bible (1990, Mentor Records)
- To the Max (1991, Mentor Records)
- Over the Top (2005, Mentor Records)
- Ducefixion (2009, Mentor Records)
- The Illuminaughty (2017, Mentor Records)

=== Compilations ===
- Up the Dose / You Axed for It! (1989, Metal Blade/Death Records)
- Houses of the Horny (1994, Mentor Records)
- West Coast Debauchery (2008, Mentor Records, compilation of the tracks from Live at the Whiskey/Cathay de Grande and Live in Frisco)

== Videography ==
- 1983: Get Up & Die
- 1987: Fuck Movie
- 1990: A Piece of Sinema
- 1990: The Wretched World of the Mentors
- 1991: Hollywood Head Bash
- 1991: Tour De Max '91
- 1993: El Duce: The Man. The Myth. The Video
- 2007: El Duce Vita
- 2010: Perverted Movie
- 2017: The Kings of Sleaze (documentary)
- 2019: The El Duce Tapes (documentary)
