= Lynn Hirschberg =

American journalist

Lynn Hirschberg is an American journalist who has written for Rolling Stone, Vanity Fair and The New York Times. Since 2008, she has been the interviewer of the online video series Lynn Hirschberg's Screen Tests, where she interviews celebrities for W magazine.

== Career ==
In 2008, Hirschberg created Lynn Hirschberg's Screen Tests for T: The New York Times Style Magazine. The Screen Tests were a series of short black and white videos featuring close-ups of celebrities answering questions Hirschberg had posed. In 2010, Hirschberg left T to work at W Magazine and carried over her Screen Tests series.

In 2015, Hirschberg began a new video series, again for W, called Birthday Stories featuring actors, models, and designers discussing their birthdays. In 2020, Hirschberg began a new podcast for W Magazine, 5 things with Lynn Hirschberg, in which she asks high-profile celebrities about a person, place, thing, and two experiences that have affected their lives.

=== Controversies ===
Hirschberg has been the subject of ire from several of her interviewees. In 1992, she wrote a piece for Vanity Fair about Courtney Love, who was then pregnant with her daughter Frances Bean Cobain. The article contained six factual errors, in addition to misrepresenting the medical implications of Love's past heroin usage, but it caused Cobain to be removed from the care of her parents by Child Protective Services shortly after her birth while an investigation was launched. It is also credited for unfairly turning public opinion against Love and Cobain for years to come, as well as incurring enormous legal fees from them. In response to the article, Love left Hirschberg a threatening message on her answering machine. Love also recorded and released a bootleg song called "Bring Me the Head of Lynn Hirschberg" and blamed Hirschberg in part for Cobain's suicide.

In January 1996, Hirschberg wrote an article in the New York Times alleging that Faith Evans cheated on her husband, Christopher "The Notorious B.I.G." Wallace, with Wallace's friend and rival Tupac Shakur, something Evans has consistently denied.

In 1997, she wrote a piece about Jamie Tarses for The New York Times Magazine. A year earlier at age 32, Tarses was named president of entertainment at ABC, the first woman ever to serve as a network's top programmer, and the second-youngest person to be the lead programmer of a network (after her mentor Brandon Tartikoff, who was 31 when he took over at NBC). Tarses had been hired by ABC because she had brought success to NBC: she helped develop Friends and shepherded Mad About You and Frasier; worked on the development of The Fresh Prince of Bel-Air, Wings, and Blossom, and at the beginning of her career, monitored scripts on Cheers. (Her father wrote for the Carol Burnett Show; her brother is a writer.) ABC was "a snakepit" at the time. Hirschberg observed Tarses' hairstyle, way of sitting, and her stress and wrote about "a nervous girl." "Women are emotional, and Jamie is particularly emotional," she wrote quoting an anonymous male. "You think of her as a girl, and it changes how you do business with her."

In 2010, Hirschberg interviewed rapper M.I.A. for T: The New York Times Style Magazine. In the piece, she contrasted the rapper's luxurious lifestyle with her political viewpoints in unflattering ways, leading to criticism from M.I.A., who would later release her own audio of the interview as well as releasing Hirschberg's telephone number through Twitter. In response the editors of T issued a statement clarifying that some of the quotes were taken out of context and published out of order.
