= Eldon Hoke =

American musician

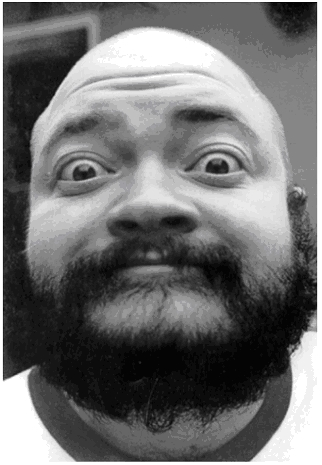

Background information
- Also known as: El Duce
- Born: Eldon Wayne Hoke; March 23, 1958; Seattle, Washington, U.S.
- Died: April 19, 1997 (aged 39) Riverside, California, U.S.
- Genres: Heavy metal, punk rock, shock rock
- Instruments: Vocals, drums
- Years active: 1974–1997
- Labels: Ever Rat, Mentor, Metal Blade, Mystic

Eldon Wayne Hoke (March 23, 1958 – April 19, 1997), nicknamed El Duce, was an American musician best known as the drummer and lead singer of the shock rock band the Mentors, as well as other acts, including Chinas Comidas and the Screamers.

Apart from his musical career, Eldon was also an actor who appeared in several films as an extra, and discussed his band and lifestyle on Jerry Springer and Wally George TV talk-shows.

The Mentors' songs were covered by artists including Black Label Society, GWAR, and Koffin Kats, and quoted by Guns N' Roses (in "Cornshucker"), Anthrax (in "I'm the Man") and Dr. Know (in "Fist F*ck").

== Early life ==
Hoke was born in Seattle, Washington to mother Doris Hope and father Walter Hoke. His father designed bombs for the Vietnam War, and he was also abusive toward Eldon and his sister. He attended Roosevelt High School where he formed the Mentors with school friends Eric Carlson and Steve Broy after he was expelled for repeatedly vandalizing the school.

== Career ==
=== The Mentors ===
Hoke and the Mentors worked to gain attention through farcical demonstrations of political incorrectness. The band's guitarist, Eric Carlson, renamed himself "Sickie Wifebeater", and the group often appeared in public wearing black executioner hoods.

During the 1985 U.S. Senate Committee on Commerce, Science and Transportation's hearings into the proliferation of "obscene" lyrics in popular music, the Reverend Jeff Ling recited the lyrics to the Mentors song, "Golden Shower" to musician Frank Zappa, who opposed the hearings. The lyrics, which included the line, "Bend up and smell my anal vapor/Your face is my toilet paper" prompted Zappa and others to denounce the hearings as a farce.

=== Kurt Cobain death claim ===
After the body of Nirvana frontman Kurt Cobain was discovered in the greenhouse of Cobain's Lake Washington home on April 8, 1994, Hoke began making the claim that Cobain's wife, Courtney Love, had offered to pay him to kill Cobain. Hoke promoted his story in such media outlets as TV's Jerry Springer Show, The National Enquirer weekly tabloid, and in Nick Broomfield's documentary film, Kurt & Courtney. In 1996, Hoke passed a lie detector test when claiming that Love had offered him $50,000 to kill Kurt Cobain. In his interview in the Kurt and Courtney film, recorded on April 11, 1997, El Duce again claimed that Love had offered him $50,000 to "whack" Kurt Cobain, and further claimed that he knew who did kill Cobain (giving the name "Allen", some say from the band Kill Allen Wrench), but said he would "let the FBI catch him".

=== Other appearances ===
In addition to his musical career, Hoke also worked as an extra in television (such talk shows like Hot Seat with Wally George and The Jerry Springer Show, and Tales From The Crypt episode), movies (including the science fiction musical Population: 1, starring his bandmate Tomata Du Plenty; Two Idiots in Hollywood, directed by Stephen Tobolowsky; and Du-beat-e-o, starring Joan Jett), and in music video productions.

In 1998 Backstage Sluts (lately shortened and re-edited as Backstage Pass: Uncensored), directed by Matt Zane, was released — a movie wherein famous rockers (including members of Motörhead, Korn, Limp Bizkit, Sugar Ray and Insane Clown Posse) recount their wildest sexual moments, while actual porn stars acted them out. The film contains a penultimate interview with El Duce from 1997, in which he drunkenly declares his taste in the opposite sex: "I like nasty women. I like... homeless women."

== Death ==
On April 19, 1997, one day after his final performance and talking to Brent Alden, and eight days after filming his interview with Nick Broomfield for the Kurt & Courtney documentary, Hoke was found dead on the railroad tracks in Riverside, California. He was "decapitated in the accident — he was hit full on by a freight train doing 60 MPH", according to Steve Broy, the Mentors' bass player. Subsequent tests indicated a high blood alcohol content and thus Hoke's official cause of death was given by the coroner's office as "misadventure". Al Jourgensen (of the industrial metal band Ministry) wrote in his autobiography that El Duce was killed by the train when some fans on the other side of the railroad tracks called his name and, as he attempted to cross to meet them, his toes became stuck in the track. Another story is that he gave a Nazi salute in front of the train as it mowed him down. Due to the timing of his death (eight days after the Kurt and Courtney interview), some have speculated that his death was related to the statements he made that Courtney Love offered him $50,000 to "whack" Cobain, and that someone named "Allen" took the offer.

According to the self-published book Truth Is Funnier Than Fiction by Mentors bass player Steve Broy, the whole story was concocted by Mentors associate Rev. Bud Green in order to sell supermarket tabloids.

== Discography ==
=== With the Mentors ===
Studio albums

- 1982 – Trash Bag (a.k.a. "Get Up & Die") (EP)
- 1985 – You Axed for It!
- 1986 – Up the Dose
- 1989 – Sex, Drugs & Rock 'n' Roll (live)
- 1990 – Rock Bible
- 1991 – To the Max

Singles

- 2007 – Shotgun Suicide [1997]
- 2009 – Oblivion Train [1977]
- 2018 – Nuthang [1977]

Live albums

- 1983 – Live at the Whisky / Cathay De Grande
- 1987 – Live in Frisco [1983]
- 2017 – To the Max "Live" [1992]

Compilations

- 1994 – Houses of the Horny
- 2023 – "The Rock Bible" Outtakes

Demo tapes

- 1981 – "The Mentors" Demo
- 1989 – "Rock Bible" Demo

Featured on

- 1984 – Various artists – The Sound of Hollywood – Copulation

=== With Gardy-Loo! ===
Studio albums

- 1997 – Perverts on Parade

=== Solo releases ===
- 1991 – The Man, the Myth, the Legend
- 1992 – Booze and Broads
- 1993 – Musical Pornography
- 1993 – Slave to thy Master
- 1995 – Buttfucking Man
- 1996 – Lock Up Yer Daughters
- 1997 – Karaoke King I
- 1997 – Karaoke King II
- 2010 – God [1996]
- 2011 – El Duce's XXX-Mas [1996]
- 2018 – Symphony [1991 & 1996]
- 2018 – Three Second Man (single)
- 2018 – The Man of the House (single)
- 2018 – Harvest Time in Humboldt County (single)
- 2018 – El Duce & The Sex Devils – Man, Myth, Live! [1991]
- 2020 – 1985
- 2021 – Dead Man Rocking (EP)

=== As featured artist ===
- 1987 – Zoetrope – A Life of Crime
- 1991 – Dr. Heathen Scum II – El Magnifico Musicione
- 1991 – Insect on Acid – Sex Sex Sex
- 1996 – Love Sandwich – Hollywood 4-Way
- 1997 – Sloth – Bring On The Gaffs

== Videography ==
- 1981 – Get Up & Die
- 1987 – Fuck Movie
- 1990 – A Piece of Sinema
- 1990 – The Wretched World of The Mentors
- 1991 – Hollywood Head Bash
- 1991 – Tour De Max '91
- 1993 – El Duce: The Man. The Myth. The Video
- 2007 – El Duce Vita
- 2010 – Perverted Movie
- 2017 – The Kings of Sleaze (documentary)
- 2019 – The El Duce Tapes (documentary)

Appearances:

- 1986 – Quiet Riot – The Wild and the Young (promo video)
- 1997 – Nine Inch Nails – Closure (documentary)
- 2011 – Ministry – Fix (documentary)
