= Ian Halperin =

Canadian investigative journalist (born 1964)

- Born: August 17, 1964 (age 62); Montreal, Quebec, Canada
- Website: ianundercover.com

Ian Halperin (born August 17, 1964) is a Canadian investigative journalist, writer and documentary filmmaker. His 2009 book, Unmasked: The Final Years of Michael Jackson was a #1 best-seller on the New York Times list on July 24, 2009. He is the author or coauthor of nine books including Celine Dion: Behind the Fairytale, Fire and Rain: The James Taylor Story and Hollywood Undercover. He coauthored Who Killed Kurt Cobain? and Love and Death: The Murder of Kurt Cobain with Max Wallace. Halperin has contributed to 60 Minutes II and was a regular correspondent for Court TV.

== Michael Jackson biography ==
In late 2008 The Sun and In Touch Weekly cited Halperin as the source in articles stating that Michael Jackson had serious health issues. In December 2008 Halperin had predicted that Jackson had six months to live; Jackson died on June 25, 2009. At the time, the BBC reported that Halperin would release an unauthorized biography on the pop star. Halperin's statements had been denied by a Jackson representative who said in a December 2008 statement, "The writer's wild allegations concerning Mr. Jackson's health are a total fabrication...Mr. Jackson is in fine health and finalizing negotiations with a major entertainment company & television network for both a world tour and a series of specials and appearances." Shortly afterward, Jackson announced a 50-date residency at the O2 Arena, holding a public press conference. Halperin released his biography on Jackson, titled Unmasked: The Final Years of Michael Jackson, in July 2009. Halperin commented on the timing of the book: "I timed it because I knew around this time he was a candidate to die. I'm being totally up-front about that. Google it."

=== Documentary film ===
In 2010, Halperin directed and produced a documentary film about Jackson titled Gone Too Soon. It premiered on the TV Guide Network on June 25, 2010, the one-year anniversary of Jackson's death. The documentary was based on 300 hours of footage Halperin recorded before and immediately after Jackson's death.

== Personal life ==
Halperin is Jewish.

== Bibliography ==
- Kardashian Dynasty: The Controversial Rise of America's Royal Family. Gallery Books. 2016. ISBN 978-1501128882.
- Whitney and Bobbi Kristina. Gallery Books. 2015. ISBN 978-1-50-112074-9.
- The Governator: From Muscle Beach to His Quest For the White House, the Improbable Rise of Arnold Schwarzenegger. HarperCollins Publishers. 2010. ISBN 978-0-06-199004-5.
- Brangelina: The Untold Story of Brad Pitt and Angelina Jolie. Transit Publishing. 2009. ISBN 978-0-9812396-6-8.
- Unmasked: The Final Years of Michael Jackson. Simon Spotlight Entertainment. 2009. ISBN 978-1-4391-7717-4.
- Guy Laliberté: The Fabulous Story of the Creator of Cirque du Soleil. Transit Publishing. 2009. ISBN 978-1926745145.
- Hollywood Undercover: Revealing the Sordid Secrets of Tinseltown. Edinburgh, UK: Mainstream Publishing. 2008. ISBN 978-1-84596-266-1.
- Love & Death: The Murder of Kurt Cobain. Atria. 2004. ISBN 978-0-7434-8483-1. (with Max Wallace)
- Miss Supermodel America. OGO Books. 2004. ISBN 978-0-9684804-8-9.
- Bad And Beautiful: Inside the Dazzling And Deadly World of Supermodels. Citadel. 2002. ISBN 978-0-8065-2310-1.
- Best Ceos: How the Wild, Wild Web Was Won. OGO Books. 2000. ISBN 978-0-9684804-3-4.
- Fire and Rain : The James Taylor Story. Citadel. 2000. ISBN 978-1-55972-533-0.
- Shut Up and Smile: Supermodels, the Dark Side. OGO Books. 1999. ISBN 978-0-9684804-0-3.
- Who Killed Kurt Cobain? The Mysterious Death of an Icon. Citadel. 1998. ISBN 978-1-55972-446-3. (with Max Wallace)
- Celine Dion: Behind The Fairytale – A Very, Very, Unauthorized Biography. Boca Pub Group. 1997. ISBN 978-0-9659583-0-1.

== Filmography ==
- 2005: The Cobain Case (documentary)
- 2008: His Highness Hollywood (documentary)
- 2010: Gone Too Soon (documentary)
- 2012: Chasing Gaga (documentary)
