= Best Reached Horizons =

Compilation album by Angra
- Released: October 24, 2012
- Genre: Power metal
- Label: SPV/Steamhammer

Best Reached Horizons is the first compilation album by the Brazilian power metal band Angra, released on October 24, 2012, via SPV/Steamhammer. This compilation marks the 20th Anniversary of the band and the idea behind the name's choice is based on the first demo released by Angra in 1992, entitled Reaching Horizons.

== Editions ==
- European: Double CD - First CD with 10 music from the era in which André Matos was the lead singer, from 1991 until 2000; And second CD with 10 tracks from the era when Edu Falaschi was the vocalist of the band, from 2001 to 2010.
- Japanese: CD+DVD - One CD with 18 varied songs from all previous releases; And one DVD with all music videos released by Angra.

== Track listing ==
=== European edition ===
Disc One: First Years (1991-2000)
No.	Title	Writer(s)	Original Album	Length
1.	"Carry On"	André Matos	Angels Cry	5:04
2.	"Angels Cry"	Matos, Rafael Bittencourt	Angels Cry	6:49
3.	"Wuthering Heights" (Kate Bush's Cover)	Kate Bush	Angels Cry	4:41
4.	"Evil Warning"	Matos, Bittencourt, Marco Antunes	Angels Cry	6:43
5.	"Nothing To Say"	Matos, Kiko Loureiro, Ricardo Confessori	Holy Land	6:22
6.	"Holy Land"	Matos	Holy Land	6:26
7.	"Carolina IV" (Live)	All Members	Holy Live; originally from Holy Land	13:13
8.	"Freedom Call"	Matos	Freedom Call (EP)	5:04
9.	"Lisbon"	Matos	Fireworks	5:14
10.	"Metal Icarus"	Loureiro, Bittencourt, Confessori	Fireworks	6:23

Disc Two: Nova Era (2000-2012)
No.	Title	Writer(s)	Original Album	Length
1.	"Nova Era"	Edu Falaschi, Loureiro, Bittencourt	Rebirth	4:52
2.	"Rebirth"	Loureiro, Bittencourt	Rebirth	5:16
3.	"Hunters And Prey"	Falaschi, Loureiro, Bittencourt	Hunters And Prey (EP)	6:29
4.	"Spread Your Fire"	Falaschi, Loureiro, Bittencourt	Temple Of Shadows	4:26
5.	"Waiting Silence"	Loureiro, Bittencourt	Temple Of Shadows	4:55
6.	"The Course Of Nature"	Falaschi, Loureiro	Aurora Consurgens	4:31
7.	"Salvation: Suicide"	Loureiro, Bittencourt	Aurora Consurgens	4:21
8.	"Arising Thunder"	Falaschi, Loureiro	Aqua	4:50
9.	"Lease Of Life"	Falaschi	Aqua	4:34
10.	"Kashmir" (Led Zeppelin's Cover)	Jimmy Page, John Bonham, Robert Plant	The Music Remains The Same - A Tribute To Led Zeppelin	7:38

=== Japanese edition ===
CD
No.	Title	Writer(s)	Original Album	Length
1.	"Unfinished Allegro"	André Matos, Franz Schubert	Angels Cry	1:14
2.	"Carry On"	Matos	Angels Cry	5:04
3.	"Angels Cry"	Matos, Rafael Bittencourt	Angels Cry	6:49
4.	"Nothing To Say"	Matos, Kiko Loureiro, Ricardo Confessori	Holy Land	6:22
5.	"Z.I.T.O"	Matos, Loureiro, Confessori	Holy Land	6:05
6.	"Wings Of Reality"	Matos	Fireworks	5:55
7.	"Lisbon"	Matos	Fireworks	5:14
8.	"In Excelsis"	Loureiro	Rebirth	1:03
9.	"Nova Era"	Edu Falaschi, Loureiro, Bittencourt	Rebirth	4:52
10.	"Bleeding Heart"	Falaschi, Bittencourt	Rebirth; originally from Hunters And Prey (EP)	4:04
11.	"Live And Learn"	Loureiro, Bittencourt	Hunters And Prey (EP)	4:12
12.	"Deus Le Volt!"	Loureiro	Temple Of Shadows	0:52
13.	"Spread Your Fire"	Falaschi, Loureiro, Bittencourt	Temple Of Shadows	4:26
14.	"Angels And Demons"	Falaschi, Loureiro, Bittencourt	Temple Of Shadows	4:11
15.	"The Voice Commanding You"	Bittencourt	Aurora Consurgens	5:27
16.	"Scream Your Heart Out"	Loureiro	Aurora Consurgens	4:26
17.	"Arising Thunder"	Falaschi, Loureiro	Aqua	4:50
18.	"Lease Of Life"	Falaschi	Aqua	4:34

=== DVD ===
- Carry On (1993)
- Time (1993)
- Make Believe (1996)
- Rebirth (2001)
- Pra Frente Brasil! (2002)
- Wishing Well (2004)
- The Course of Nature (2006)
- Lease of Life (2010)

== Credits ==
Band members

- Rafael Bittencourt (1991–present) – Lead guitar
- Felipe Andreoli (2001–present) – Bass guitar

Former members

- André Matos (1991–2000) – Lead vocals, keyboards, piano
- Luís Mariutti (1991–2000) – Bass guitar
- Aquiles Priester (2001–2008) – Drums, percussion
- Edu Falaschi (2001–2010) – Lead vocals, acoustic guitar
- Kiko Loureiro (1991–2015) – Lead guitar
- Ricardo Confessori (1993–2000/2009–2014) – Drums, percussion

Guest musicians

- Alex Holzwarth (1993) – Drums, percussion on Angels Cry
- Sabine Edelsbacher (2004) – Lead vocals on "Spread Your Fire" from Temple of Shadows
- Fábio Laguna (2001–2008) – Keyboards
