= Vera Cruz (album) =

Studio album by Edu Falaschi
- Released: May 12, 2021
- Recorded: November 2020
- Studio: Nas Nuvens Studios, Rio de Janeiro
- Genre: Power metal
- Length: 59:39
- Language: English, Portuguese
- Label: MS Metal Records
- Producer: Edu Falaschi, Roberto Barros, Thiago Bianchi

Edu Falaschi chronology
Temple of Shadows – In Concert (2020)	Vera Cruz (2021)	Eldorado (2023)

Vera Cruz is the third solo album by Brazilian heavy metal singer Edu Falaschi, the first with all-new material, released initially on May 12, 2021, in Japan via MS Metal Records, digitally to the rest of the world on May 18, 2021. The album was then released physically, first in Brazil on May 31, 2021, and then to the rest of the world on June 15, 2021.

Released to celebrate the 30 years of his career, it is a concept album that tells an adventure story between Brazil and Portugal around the time of the discovery of Brazil and that features several guests, such as Elba Ramalho and Max Cavalera (who hadn't guest performed in the past 25 years).

== Background ==
Vera Cruz is the first solo album featuring new material only by Falaschi (outside of his project Almah). It comes after two cover albums (Moonlight (2016) and Ballads (2017)), one EP featuring two new songs and some live performances (The Glory of Sacred Truth) and one live release (Temple of Shadows – In Concert) in which he performed Temple of Shadows in its entirety (an album he had released in 2004 with his now former band Angra. It is a work in which he recovers some vocal techniques he used to apply in his time with Angra, but which he temporarily lost due to voice issues.

== Production ==
The album was created at a cost of approximately R$ 100,000, recorded in November 2020 at Nas Nuvens studios in Rio de Janeiro and produced by Falaschi himself alongside Roberto Barros and vocalist Thiago Bianchi (ex-Shaman).

The cover (in a vertical format) and the title were revealed in December 2020, together with the announcement that the album would be released in May 2021 and that the it was available for pre-order on the 4fan website.

=== Plot ===
The album's plot, which begins in 1492 in the Portuguese city of Tomar, follows Jorge, a Portuguese child abandoned soon after birth with a birthmark related to the Ordem da Cruz de Nero (Order of Nero's Cross). As an adult, he goes to Brazil, marries an indigenous woman and join the remaining natives to defend the land from other Portuguese invaders. Falaschi researched the history of the Crusades in order to write the album, drawing inspiration specifically from the fact that some Templars traveled to Brazil.

Falaschi said that since the beginning he knew the album's themes and sound could generate comparisons with Angra, specifically with the album Holy Land, which also discussed the History of Brazil in its lyrics. According to him, however, the similarities are "natural" since he and two of the supporting musicians (keyboardist Fábio Laguna and drummer Aquiles Priester) worked with the band for years.

== Release and promotion ==
The album was released in conventional formats and also in a special box with a digibook, a CD, a DVD, a booklet with the plot summary, the lyrics, some pictures, a T-shirt and a mug.

== Track listing ==
Vera Cruz track listing
No.	Title	Length
1.	"Burden"	2:00
2.	"The Ancestry"	5:50
3.	"Sea of Uncertainties"	4:54
4.	"Skies in Your Eyes"	4:25
5.	"Frol de la Mar"	0:58
6.	"Crosses"	4:40
7.	"Land Ahoy"	9:40
8.	"Fire with Fire"	6:39
9.	"Mirror of Delusion"	5:28
10.	"Bonfire of the Vanities" (featuring Tito Falaschi)	3:29
11.	"Face of the Storm" (featuring Max Cavalera)	7:30
12.	"Rainha do Luar" (Queen of Moonlight (featuring Elba Ramalho))	4:06
Total length:		59:39

Japanese edition bonus track
No.	Title	Length
13.	"Skies in Your Eyes" (Acoustic Version)	4:21
Total length:		63:52

== Personnel ==
Per sources.

- Edu Falaschi – vocals

=== Session musicians ===
- Diogo Mafra – guitar
- Roberto Barros – guitar
- Raphael Dafras – bass
- Fábio Laguna – keyboards
- Aquiles Priester – drums

=== Guest performances ===
- Max Cavalera – vocals on "Face of the Storm"
- Elba Ramalho – vocals on "Rainha do Luar"
- Tito Falaschi – guitar solo on "Bonfire of the Vanities"
- Federico Puppi – cello on "Bonfire of Vanities" and "Rainha do Luar"
- Tiago Mineiro – piano on "Land Ahoy" and "Rainha do Luar"
- Adriano Machado – strings arrangements and conducting
- Rafael Meninão – accordion on "Rainha do Luar"

=== Technical personnel ===
- Dennis Ward – mixing and mastering
- Pablo Greg – orchestrations
- Fábio Caldeira – plot co-writing
- Carlos Fides – cover art
