= Fábio Laguna =

Brazilian musician (born 1977)

- Born: March 1977 (age 49); Mococa, São Paulo, Brazil
- Genres: Heavy metal
- Occupation: Musician
- Instrument: Keyboards
- Years active: 1999–present
- Member of: Hangar
- Formerly of: Angra; Tierramystica

Fábio Laguna (born March 1977) is a Brazilian keyboardist. He is most famous for playing with Angra since 2001 and as a member of Hangar band since 2002. In 2006 he released his last solo album called Freakeys along with members of both bands.

== Early life ==
He was born in Mococa, a small city from São Paulo state in Brazil. Fábio began playing keyboards from an early age. He and his older brother André, took keyboard classes, which Fabio dropped early. As a teenager, he began rehearsing with his first rock band and performing small concerts. After that he played in a small professional night band. For 4 years he toured the states of São Paulo and Minas Gerais in a VW Transporter (commonly known in Brazil as "Kombi", short form of "Kombinationfahrzeug").

After a tough decision of studying law, along with the college he played in other small rock bands, arranged and produced his first records. He worked as a freelancer in several other bands. In 1999 Fábio started playing with heavy metal bands, and recorded his first solo album, All Night Party at Gallamauaka's Land, which he used as a curriculum vitae for his 8 years of music. Record company Mega Hard contacted Hangar and Fábio recorded the Inside Your Soul album.

== Career ==
By 2001, Brazilian band Angra had split and reformed with Hangar's drummer Aquiles Priester. Aquiles asked Fábio to join them for the Rebirth tour. He accepted, dropping all other professional commitments in order to become "a heavy-metal keyboardist in the land of samba". He played 100 concerts in 17 countries on this tour. In 2001 he released All Night Party at Gallamauaka's Land.

2003 had Fábio touring Brazil with Hangar, which he had joined the year before. He recorded keyboards for the debut album of Thalion, Another Sun. His second solo album was Ffreakys, having Angra's and Hangar's members playing progressive metal, which was released in 2006.

In 2016, he was announced as the new keyboardist for folk metal band Tierramystica.

== Discography ==
- Flávio Marx Band - Em um Estado Imaginário
- Spirit Heaven - Aria's Kingdom
- Funeratus - Upcoming Apparition
- Funeratus - Storm of Vengeance
- Eyes of Shiva - Eyes of Shiva
- Thalion - Another Sun
- William Shakespears's Hamlet (various)
- Angra - Rebirth World Tour - Live in São Paulo
- Angra - Hunters and Prey
- Hangar - Inside Your Soul
- Fábio Laguna - All Night Party at Gallamauaka's Land
- Freakeys - Freakeys
- Hangar - The Reason of Your Conviction
- Edu Falaschi - Vera Cruz (2021)
