= No Gravity =

No Gravity may refer to:

- No Gravity (Kiko Loureiro album), the first solo album by Brazilian power metal guitarist Kiko Loureiro
- No Gravity (Shontelle album), the second studio album by Barbadian R&B singer Shontelle
- No Gravity (video game), a space shooter
