= Midas Fate =

Brazilian progressive metal band

- Origin: Brazil
- Genres: Progressive metal
- Years active: 2009–present
- Label: CodiShift Records
- Members: Mike DiMeo, Aquiles Priester, Vitor Campos, Renato Videira
- Website: midasfate.com

Midas Fate is a progressive metal band founded by guitarist Vitor Campos in 2009. The band has released one single entitled "What Dreams May Come" in 2011 with Mike DiMeo, former singer of the bands Riot and Masterplan through CodiShift Records. In 2013 they announced their new drummer, Aquiles Priester (Vinnie Moore, Tony MacAlpine, Hangar, ex-Angra). A full-length album, called "Magnificent Rebel" was set to be released by the end of 2013, but according to the band's Facebook page, there is no release date yet for the new album.

The announcement of the new drummer followed the release of the music video of the song "Stillborn Reason" taken from the DVD – Aquiles Priester's 100 TOP DRUM FILLS (2013). This music video features an exclusive instrumental version of the song, to be released in the "Magnificent Rebel" album with vocals.

== Band members ==
- Mike DiMeo – lead vocals (2010–present)
- Aquiles Priester – drums (2013–present)
- Vitor Campos – guitars (2009–present)
- Renato Videira – bass (2009–present)

=== Guest and session musicians ===
- Rafael Videira – session violin and viola (2010)
- Mário Videira – session piano (2013)

== Discography ==
=== Studio albums ===
- Magnificent Rebel (no release date yet)

=== Singles/EPs ===
- What Dreams May Come (2011)

=== Music videos ===
- "Stillborn Reason" (music video taken from the DVD Aquiles Priester's 100 Top Drum Fills (2013)
