= Fireworks (Angra album) =

Studio album by Angra
- Released: July 14, 1998
- Recorded: London, April–June 1998
- Genre: Heavy metal, progressive metal, power metal
- Length: 57:32
- Label: Lucretia/Steamhammer
- Producer: Chris Tsangarides

Angra chronology
| Holy Land (1996) | Fireworks (1998) | Rebirth (2001) |

Professional ratings
Review scores
| Source | Rating |
|---|---|
| AllMusic | 4/5 stars |
| Metal Storm | 7.4/10 |

Fireworks is the third studio album by the Brazilian power metal band Angra. It was released in 1998 on Lucretia Records. It was their last album to feature Andre Matos on vocals and Luís Mariutti on bass, and the last to feature drummer Ricardo Confessori until Aqua in 2010.

== Background ==
According to guitarist Kiko Loureiro, vocalist Andre Matos had decided to leave Angra right after the Holy Live tour to work on his solo project Virgo (a collaboration with Sascha Paeth), and the band had started to rehearse with Edu Falaschi as his probable replacement. However, a French executive from the record company talked to them over dinner to help patch their differences. Even so, Kiko recalls feeling that Andre was distant, mostly working on his own compositions alone instead of collaborating with the other members.

== Track listing ==
| No. | Title | Lyrics | Music | Length |
|---|---|---|---|---|
| 1. | "Wings of Reality" | Andre Matos | Matos | 5:54 |
| 2. | "Petrified Eyes" | Chris Tsangarides | Rafael Bittencourt | 6:05 |
| 3. | "Lisbon" | Matos | Matos | 5:13 |
| 4. | "Metal Icarus" | Bittencourt | Bittencourt, Kiko Loureiro, Ricardo Confessori | 6:23 |
| 5. | "Paradise" | Matos | Bittencourt, Loureiro, Matos | 7:38 |
| 6. | "Mystery Machine" | Tsangarides, Confessori | Bittencourt, Loureiro, Matos | 4:11 |
| 7. | "Fireworks" | Matos | Bittencourt, Loureiro, Matos, Confessori | 6:20 |
| 8. | "Extreme Dream" | Matos | Bittencourt, Loureiro | 4:16 |
| 9. | "Gentle Change" | Bittencourt | Bittencourt, Luis Mariutti, Confessori | 5:35 |
| 10. | "Speed" | Matos | Loureiro | 5:57 |
| Total length: | | | | 57:32 |

Japanese edition bonus track
| No. | Title | Lyrics | Music | Length |
|---|---|---|---|---|
| 11. | "Rainy Nights" | Matos | Bittencourt, Loureiro, Matos | 5:03 |
| Total length: | | | | 62:35 |

== Personnel ==
- Andre Matos - vocals, keyboards
- Kiko Loureiro - guitars
- Rafael Bittencourt - guitars
- Luis Mariutti - bass
- Ricardo Confessori - drums

== Recording information ==
- Recorded at Metropolis and Rainmaker Studios, London, England, from April to June 1998.
- Additional recordings at Marcus Studios, London, June 1998.
- Orchestra recorded at Abbey Road Studios, London, May 1998.
- Mixed by Chris Tsangarides at Rainmaker Studios, June 1998.
- Mastered by Ian Cooper
- Cover concept by Ricardo Confessori
- Cover artwork & Sleeve design by Isabel de Amorium at Arsenic, Boulogne, France.

== Charts ==
| Chart (1998) | Peak position |
|---|---|
| French Albums (SNEP) | 41 |
| Japanese Albums (Oricon) | 15 |
