= Tierramystica =

Brazilian folk metal band

- Origin: Porto Alegre, Rio Grande do Sul, Brazil
- Genres: Folk metal, power metal, andean music
- Years active: 2008–present
- Label: Voice Music
- Members: Ricardo "Chileno" Durán; Alexandre Tellini; Luciano Thumé; Gui Antonioli; TH Costa
- Past members: Dan Rubin; Fabiano Muller; Rafael Martinelli; Eduardo Gomes; Bruno Lacerda; Gustavo Strapazon; Fábio Laguna; Ricardo Confessori; André Nascimento; Jesus Hernades; Rafael Dachary
- Website: http://www.tierramysticaofficial.com

Tierramystica is a Brazilian folk metal band from Porto Alegre, Rio Grande do Sul, founded in 2008. The band is noted for blending heavy/power metal with elements of andean music. As an opening act, they have performed with names such as Angra, Sepultura, Symphony X, Epica, Paul Di'Anno and Scorpions.

== History ==
The band was formed on January 28, 2008, when guitarist Fabiano Muller and vocalist Ricardo "Chileno" Durán quit the band Toccata Magna and joined guitarist Alexandre Tellini for a new musical venture. The line up was later completed with bassist Rafael Martinelli, keyboardist Luciano Thumé, drummer Eduardo "Duca" Gomes and vocalist André Nascimento.

Their debut EP, named New Eldorado and containing the title-song and "Spiritual Song", sold a total of 100,000 copies. During the recording sessions of their first album, André left the band and was replaced by Gui Antonioli, who is also vocalist for the Brazilian progressive metal band Anaxes and guest sang with also Brazilian metal opera project SoulSpell.

In 2010, the band was one of the six finalists of the Brazilian leap of the Wacken Metal Battle, a contest of novice bands in which the winner of each country performs at the W.E.T. Stage of the Wacken Open Air. However, the winners and Brazilian representatives ended up being Pernambuco-based band Cangaço.

In 2015 and 2016, the band underwent several changes in its lineup. In September 2015, vocalist Gui Antonioli left the group and was temporarily replaced by Dan Rubin (ex-Magician, SoulSpell). In March 2016, he was hired as a full-time member. On 13 July 2016, they announced a great change in the lineup: longtime Alexandre Tellini, Rafael Martinelli, Luciano Thumé and Eduardo Gomes left and were replaced by guitarist Bruno Lacerda, bassist Gustavo Strapazon, and the already notorious Fábio Laguna on the keyboards (ex-Angra, Hangar) and Ricardo Confessori on the drums (ex-Angra, Shaman). They also announced that a new song would be released later in 2016 and that recordings for a new album should start in January 2017, with a still unknown release date.

On December 22, 2020, after the band had been out of action for 3 years, a different lineup was presented to the fans, bringing back members of the original line-up, a new fan page and a new page on Instagram with Ricardo Chileno being the only one to stay from the previous formation, with the presentation of a new song, "Beyond the Cape of Storms", in the program Quarentena Rock Fest of the channel Heavy Talk now present in all music streaming platforms.

== Discography ==
=== EP ===
- New Eldorado (2008)

=== Studio albums ===
- A New Horizon (2010)
- Heirs of the Sun (2013)

=== DVD ===
- A New Legend, a New Journey (2012; live show/documentary)

== Members ==
- Alexandre Tellini — guitars, acoustic guitar and zampoña (2008–2016; 2020—present)
- Ricardo "Chileno" Durán — vocal, ocarina, charango and acoustic guitar (2008—present)
- Luciano Thumé — keyboards (2008–2016; 2020—present)
- Gui Antonioli — vocals and percussion (2009–2015; 2020—present)
- TH Costa - baixo (2020—present)

=== Touring/session members ===
- Ademar Farinha - wind instruments

=== Former members ===
- Dan Rubin — vocals (2015–2016 as a session musician; 2016—present full-time)
- Bruno Lacerda — guitar (2016—present)
- Rafael Martinelli — bass, quena, zampoña and backing vocals (2008–2016)
- Fabiano Muller — guitar, acoustic guitar and quena (2008—present)
- Eduardo "Duca" Gomes — drums (2008–2013; 2008–2016)
- Gustavo Strapazon — bass (2016—present)
- Rafael Dachary — drums (2013)
- André Nascimento — vocals (2008)
- Jesus Hernandes — charango, ocarinas, quenas and zampoñas (2008)
- Fábio Laguna — keyboards (2016—present)
- Ricardo Confessori — drums (2016—present)
