= Di'Anno (album) =

Studio album by Di'Anno
- Released: 1984
- Recorded: Rockfield Studios, Wales
- Genres: Hard rock, AOR
- Length: 43:50
- Label: FM Coast to Coast
- Producer: Ian Wilson

Di'Anno chronology
Di'Anno (1984)	Nomad (2000)

Di'Anno is the 1984 self-titled album of the band of the same name. The lead singer Paul Di'Anno had been the frontman of the British heavy metal band Iron Maiden for three years, before being dismissed for his erratic behaviour. The band bearing his name and playing very commercial heavy rock was his first and short-lived solo project.

This album was actually released in Japan first with strange album title Two Swimmers & a Bag of Jockies. This was actually intended as a tribute to their friend and ex-drummer Mark Stewart, a cockney from East London. Two swimmers refers to fish, and jockeys' whips is slang for chips - so literally: 2 fish and a bag of chips.

The album reached only No. 105 on the UK Albums Chart and the band disbanded at the conclusion of the short tour supporting the release.

== Track listing ==
All tracks by DiAnno, Browne, Slater, Venables and Ward, except "Heartuser" by Terry Britten & Sue Shifrin.

1. "Flaming Heart" - 3:49
2. "Heartuser" - 4:03
3. "Here to Stay" - 4:51
4. "The Runner" - 3:16
5. "Tales of the Unexpected" - 6:06
6. "Razor Age" - 5:18
7. "Bright Lights" - 3:40
8. "Lady Heartbreak" - 4:18
9. "Antigua" - 4:35
10. "Road Rat" - 3:54

== Personnel ==
- Paul Di'Anno - lead vocals
- Lee Slater- guitar, backing vocals
- P.J. Ward - guitar, backing vocals
- Mark Venables - keyboards, backing vocals
- Kevin Browne - bass, backing vocals
- Dave Irving - drums
