= Fullblast =

Studio album by Kiko Loureiro
- Released: March 25, 2009
- Studio: Norcal Studios, São Paulo
- Genre: Heavy metal, neo-classical metal, progressive metal
- Length: 55:40
- Label: JVC/Victor Entertainment
- Producer: Dennis Ward

Kiko Loureiro chronology
Universo Inverso (2006)	Fullblast (2009)	Sounds of Innocence (2012)

Fullblast is the third solo album by Brazilian heavy metal guitarist Kiko Loureiro. Like the others, it is totally instrumental.

== Track listing ==
All music is composed by Kiko Loureiro

No.	Title	Length
1.	"Headstrong"	4:50
2.	"Desperado"	5:46
3.	"Cutting Edge"	3:53
4.	"Excuse Me"	4:27
5.	"Se entrega, Corisco!"	6:31
6.	"A Clairvoyance"	3:19
7.	"Corrosive Voices"	4:28
8.	"Whispering"	5:54
9.	"Outrageous"	6:11
10.	"Mundo verde"	1:48
11.	"Pura vida"	4:11
12.	"As It Is, Infinite"	2:17
Total length:		57:23

== Personnel ==
- Kiko Loureiro – guitar, keyboards, additional percussion, programming, and production.
- Felipe Andreoli - bass guitar
- Mike Terrana – drums
- DaLua - percussion
- Yaniel Matos - Rhodes piano on "Whispering"
- Brendan Duffey - Co-Production, Engineering, Mixing
- Adriano Daga - Co-Production, Engineering, Mixing
