= ØMNI =

Studio album by Angra
- Released: February 16, 2018
- Genre: Progressive metal; power metal
- Length: 60:44
- Label: JVC/Victor Entertainment (Japan); Shinigami Records (Brazil); Edel Music (United States, Canada, Russia and Europe)
- Producer: Jens Bogren

Angra chronology
Secret Garden (2014)	ØMNI (2018)	Cycles of Pain (2023)

Professional ratings
Review scores
Source	Rating
Blabbermouth.net	9.5/10

ØMNI is the ninth studio album by the Brazilian power metal band Angra. It is the first album by the band with guitarist Marcelo Barbosa (known for his work with Almah) replacing Kiko Loureiro, who left the band to join Megadeth. It was elected the 2nd best metal album of 2018 by the traditional Japanese heavy metal magazine Burrn!.

== Track listing ==
All lyrics are written by Rafael Bittencourt.

No.	Title	Music	Length
1.	"Light of Transcendence"	Rafael Bittencourt, Fabio Lione, Felipe Andreoli, Bruno Valverde, Marcelo Barbosa	4:36
2.	"Travelers of Time"	Barbosa, Lione, Bittencourt, Andreoli	4:27
3.	"Black Widow's Web" (feat. Sandy Lima and Alissa White-Gluz)	Andreoli, Bittencourt, Lione, Valverde	5:49
4.	"Insania"	Bittencourt, Lione, Andreoli	5:31
5.	"The Bottom of My Soul"	Bittencourt, Andreoli, Valverde	4:19
6.	"War Horns"	Bittencourt, Andreoli, Lione, Kiko Loureiro, Barbosa	4:43
7.	"Caveman"	Bittencourt, Andreoli, Valverde, Barbosa	5:53
8.	"Magic Mirror"	Andreoli, Bittencourt, Lione, Barbosa, Valverde.	6:58
9.	"Always More"	Bittencourt	4:43
10.	"ØMNI – Silence Inside"	Bittencourt, Andreoli, Valverde	8:31
11.	"ØMNI – Infinite Nothing"	Bittencourt, Andreoli, Lione, Barbosa, Valverde	5:14
Total length:			60:44

== Personnel ==
Angra

- Fabio Lione – vocals
- Rafael Bittencourt – guitars, vocals on "The Bottom of My Soul"
- Marcelo Barbosa – guitars
- Felipe Andreoli – bass
- Bruno Valverde – drums

Guest appearances

- Sandy Lima – vocals on "Black Widow's Web"
- Alissa White-Gluz – vocals on "Black Widow's Web"
- Kiko Loureiro – guitar solo on "War Horns"

Production

- Jens Bogren – production, recording

== Charts ==
Chart (2018)	Peak position
Belgian Albums (Ultratop Wallonia)	133
Japanese Albums (Oricon)	42
Swiss Albums (Schweizer Hitparade)	88
