= Secret Garden (album) =

Studio album by Angra
- Released: December 17, 2014 (Japan); January 16, 2015 (Brazil, North America, Europe)
- Recorded: August 2014
- Studio: Fascination Street Studios, Örebro, Sweden
- Genre: Progressive metal; power metal
- Length: 54:00
- Label: JVC/Victor Entertainment (Japan); Universal Music (Brazil); Edel Music (United States, Canada, Russia and Europe)
- Producer: Jens Bogren; Roy Z (pre-production)

Angra chronology
Aqua (2010)	Secret Garden (2014)	ØMNI (2018)

Secret Garden is the eighth studio album by the Brazilian power metal band Angra, released on 17 December 2014 in Japan and with a release date of January 2015 in Brazil and Europe. It is band's first album with singer Fabio Lione and drummer Bruno Valverde, as well as the last to feature guitarist Kiko Loureiro, who left to join Megadeth. The album also features lead vocals by guitarist Rafael Bittencourt and guest performances by Simone Simons from Epica and Doro Pesch.

Regarding the album, Loureiro commented in June 2014:

The musical changes always happen because we change as persons as well. So not only the lineup changes. So you can expect some changes, of course, with Fabio, a different voice. We try to search for new ways of doing music, so for sure you guys are gonna hear some different and new stuff, but the core and the essence of Angra is gonna be always there anyway.

== Track listing ==
No.	Title	Lyrics	Music	Lead vocals	Length
1.	"Newborn Me"	Bittencourt	Kiko Loureiro, Rafael Bittencourt, Felipe Andreoli, Fabio Lione	Lione	6:13
2.	"Black Hearted Soul"	Bittencourt	Loureiro, Bittencourt, Lione	Lione	4:48
3.	"Final Light"	Andreoli	Angra	Lione	4:24
4.	"Storm of Emotions"	Lione, Bittencourt, Andreoli	Lione, Bittencourt, Andreoli	Lione, Bittencourt	4:56
5.	"Synchronicity II" (The Police cover)	Sting	Sting	Lione, Bittencourt	5:03
6.	"Violet Sky"	Loureiro, Bittencourt	Loureiro, Bittencourt	Bittencourt	4:48
7.	"Secret Garden"	Maria Ilmoniemi	Maria Ilmoniemi	Simone Simons	4:03
8.	"Upper Levels"	Bittencourt	Loureiro, Andreoli, Lione	Lione	6:28
9.	"Crushing Room"	Ilmoniemi, Bittencourt	Ilmoniemi, Loureiro	Bittencourt, Doro Pesch	5:07
10.	"Perfect Symmetry"	Bittencourt	Bittencourt	Lione	4:22
11.	"Silent Call"	Bittencourt	Bittencourt	Bittencourt	3:48
Total length:					54:00

== Personnel ==
Angra

- Fabio Lione - lead vocals (tracks 1–5, 8, and 10)
- Kiko Loureiro - guitars, backing vocals, keyboard arrangements
- Rafael Bittencourt - guitars, lead vocals (on tracks 4–6, 9, and 11), backing vocals, acoustic guitar, artwork co-conception
- Felipe Andreoli - bass, keyboards arrangements, backing vocals, additional rhythm guitar
- Bruno Valverde - drums

Guest appearances

- Simone Simons - vocals on "Secret Garden"
- Doro Pesch - vocals on "Crushing Room"

Production

- Jens Bogren - production, recording
- Roy Z - pre-production
- Rodrigo Bastos Didier - artwork conception and creation

== Charts ==
Chart (2014)	Peak position
Belgian Albums (Ultratop Wallonia)	195
French Albums (SNEP)	174
Japanese Albums (Oricon)	20
