= Universo Inverso =

Studio album by Kiko Loureiro
- Released: September 23, 2006
- Genre: Heavy metal, jazz fusion
- Length: 55:33
- Label: Victor Entertainment/Seoul
- Producer: Dennis Ward

Kiko Loureiro chronology
No Gravity (2005)	Universo Inverso (2006)	Fullblast (2009)

Universo Inverso is the second solo album of Brazilian heavy metal guitarist Kiko Loureiro. Like No Gravity, Universo Inverso is completely instrumental. This album has strong influences of jazz and bossa nova, being considered Brazilian fusion.

Loureiro said about this album: "I always liked adventuring into different musical styles. I tried to know different styles and searched my own musical identity going through many sources. Even being rock, I tried to include my natural music, the 'Brasileiras' music. This work is the result of all this willing."

== Track listing ==
1. "Feijão-de-Corda" (pt: Black-eyed pea)– 5:34
2. "Ojos Verdes" (es: Green eyes) – 6:26
3. "Havana" – 5:27
4. "Anastácia" – 6:18
5. "Monday Mourning" – 4:21
6. "Arcos da Lapa" (pt: Lapa arches) – 4:19
7. "Samba da Elisa" (pt: Elisa's samba) – 4:39
8. "Camino a Casa" (es: The way home) – 5:21
9. "Realidade Paralela" (pt: Parallel reality) – 5:44
10. "Recuerdos" (es: Regards) – 4:41
11. "Espera Aí" (pt: Wait a second)– 2:40

== Personnel ==
- Kiko Loureiro – Guitar
- Cuca Teixeira – Drums
- Carlinhos Noronha - Bass
- Yaniel Matos - Piano
