= Di'Anno =

Defunct British rock band

- Past members: Paul Di'Anno; Aquiles Priester; Chico Dehira; Dave Irving; Felipe Andreoli; Frank Noon; Kevin Browne; Lee Slater; Mark Venables; P.J. Ward; Paulo Turin

Di'Anno was a band featuring former Iron Maiden singer Paul Di'Anno, whom the band was named after.

The band was originally called Lonewolf, with an initial line-up featuring Di'Anno, Peter Ward and John Wiggins on guitar, Mark Venables on keyboards, Kevin Browne on bass, and Mark Stuart drumming. The band released albums Di'Anno in June 1984, and Live from London. In the year 2000, the album Nomad was released under the band name of Di'Anno, with different musicians.

For the album, drummer Stewart was replaced by Dave Irving, who in turn was replaced by ex-Def Leppard, Waysted and Roadhouse drummer Frank Noon. The debut album Di'Anno was not a commercial success and the band split up later that same year. After this, Paul Di'Anno was hired to join Gogmagog with future Iron Maiden guitarist Janick Gers, former Iron Maiden drummer Clive Burr, along with other musicians to form this "supergroup".

== Discography ==
- Di'Anno (1984)
- Live from London (1985)
- Nomad (2000)
