= Felipe Andreoli =

Musical artist (born 1980)

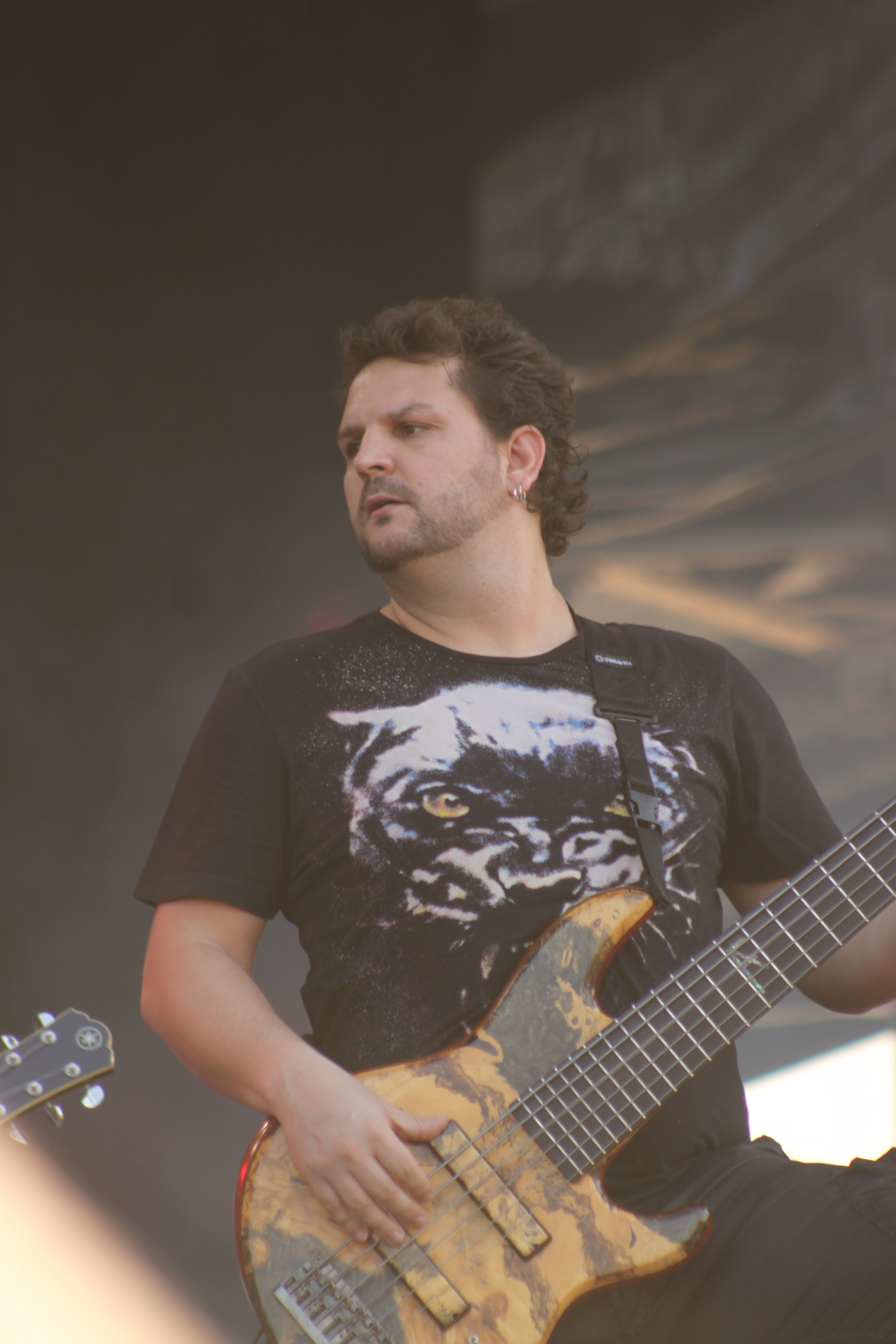
- Felipe Andreoli at the 2014 Hellfest

Background information
- Born: March 7, 1980 (age 45); São Paulo, Brazil
- Origin: Brazilian
- Genres: Heavy metal, progressive metal, power metal
- Occupation: Bassist
- Instrument: Bass
- Years active: 1993–present
- Member of: Angra
- Website: www.felipeandreoli.com

Felipe Andreoli (born March 7, 1980) is a Brazilian musician best known as the bassist for the power metal band Angra. He also acted as a fill in bassist for progressive metal supergroup Sons of Apollo in August 2022.

Andreoli first started playing the bass at age 13, when a school band needed a bass player. After joining Angra at age 20, he started an international career, recording albums and touring. He is also a music instructor, currently having online courses.

Andreoli plays Ibanez SR and BTB basses with D'Addario strings and Aguilar amps.

== Discography ==
=== Di'Anno ===
- Nomad (2000)

=== Angra ===
- Rebirth (2001)
- Hunters and Prey (2002)
- Rebirth World Tour - Live in São Paulo (2003)
- Temple of Shadows (2004)
- Aurora Consurgens (2006)
- Aqua (2010)
- Angels Cry 20th Anniversary Tour (2013)
- Secret Garden (2014)
- Ømni (2018)
- Cycles Of Pain (2023)

=== Karma ===
- Inside the Eyes (2000)
- Leave Now!!! (2005)

=== FireSign ===
- The Top Of The Mountain (2000)

=== Vox ===
- Original (2006)

=== Freakeys ===
- Freakeys (2006)

=== Time Out ===
- The Journey (2008)

=== Almah ===
- Fragile Equality (2008)
- Motion (2011)

=== Kiko Loureiro ===
- Fullblast (2008)
- Sounds of Innocence (2012)
- The White Balance (2013)
- Open Source (2020)

=== Bittencourt Project ===
- Brainworms I (2008)

=== 4Action ===
- Live in San Francisco (2013)
- Live in São Paulo at Mosh Studios (2018)

=== One Arm Away ===
- Carpe Ludus (2016)

=== Rec/All ===
- Rec/All (2017)

=== Other participations ===
- Alirio Netto - Joao de Deus (2016)
- Marcelo Barbosa - Nego (2019)
- Paulo Schroeber - Freak Songs (2011)
- Rafael Nery - My Heaven (2014)
- Lari Basilio – Golden (2011)
- Vivaldi Metal Project - The Four Seasons (2016)
- Mello Jr. - Reflections (2019)
- Indireto - Lesf!! (2011)
- Sevencrows - Deep Thoughts (2020)
- Furia Inc. - Murder Narture (2014)
- Eduardo Lira - The First Concept Project (2016)
- Lucas Bittencourt - Lucas Bittencourt (2012)
- Nenel Lucena - Inside My Head (2015)
- Samuel Zechin - Back On The Road (2014)
- Metris - The Beginning (2020)
- Krusader - Battle Memories (2016)
