= Reaching Horizons =

Demo album by Angra
- Released: 1993
- Recorded: July 1992 (tracks 1–7); January 1993 (tracks 8–9)
- Studio: Guidon Studios (tracks 1–7) & Anonimatos Studios (tracks 8–9), São Paulo
- Genre: Power metal
- Length: 53:24

Angra chronology
Reaching Horizons (1993)	Angels Cry (1993)

Professional ratings
Review scores
Source	Rating
AllMusic	4/5 stars

Reaching Horizons is the first demo album by the Brazilian power metal band Angra, released in 1993 through Limb Music. The original cassette contained six songs, with some re-recorded for their debut album Angels Cry. In 1997, the record-company re-released the album, adding three bonus tracks. It is the only release by the band that features Antunes on drums before he was replaced during the sessions for their debut album.

== Track listing ==
No.	Title	Lyrics	Music	Length
1.	"Carry On"	Andre Matos	Andre Matos	6:35
2.	"Queen Of The Night"	Rafael Bittencourt	Rafael Bittencourt	4:56
3.	"Angels Cry"	A. Matos	R. Bittencourt	7:16
4.	"Time"	A. Matos	R. Bittencourt	5:40
5.	"Evil Warning"	A. Matos	R. Bittencourt	6:24
6.	"Reaching Horizons"	R. Bittencourt	R. Bittencourt	5:35
7.	"Carry On (first try) (1997 re-release bonus track)"			6:37
8.	"Don't Despair (1997 re-release bonus track)"	Andre Matos	Andre Matos	5:11
9.	"Wuthering Heights (Speed Version) (1997 re-release bonus track)"	Kate Bush	Kate Bush	5:10

== Credits ==
- Andre Matos – vocals, keyboards
- Kiko Loureiro – lead and rhythm guitars
- Rafael Bittencourt – rhythm and lead guitars
- Luís Mariutti – bass
- Marco Antunes – drums
