= No Gravity (Kiko Loureiro album) =

Studio album by Kiko Loureiro
- Released: March 10, 2005
- Recorded: April–May 2004
- Studio: House of Audio, Karlsdorf-Neuthard, Germany
- Genre: Progressive metal, instrumental rock
- Length: 54:04
- Label: Replica
- Producer: Dennis Ward

Kiko Loureiro chronology
No Gravity (2005)	Universo Inverso (2006)

No Gravity is the first solo album of Brazilian heavy metal guitarist Kiko Loureiro. Kiko recorded with Mike Terrana in drums. It had a worldwide release in 2005. Both a "No Gravity" songbook and a playback CD were also issued and are highly sought after by musicians and fans alike.

The title, "No Gravity" comes from the feeling that musicians feels while playing: "The further we know and dominate the rational and mathematical part of the music, the intuitive parts take control of us and really take us to 'travel' with the music we're playing. It's this point that the musician wanna hit the people, but he must achieve with himself first. For this feeling I have chosen this term: 'No Gravity'".

== Track listing ==
1. "Enfermo" – 04:02
2. "Endangered Species" – 05:10
3. "Escaping" – 05:34
4. "No Gravity" – 04:23
5. "Pau-de-Arara" – 07:00
6. "La Force de L'âme" – 04:32
7. "Tapping Into My Dark Tranquility" – 02:12
8. "Moment of Truth" – 04:29
9. "Beautiful Language" – 02:00
10. "In a Gentle Way" – 05:33
11. "Dilemma" – 04:12
12. "Feliz Desilusão" – 03:39
13. "Choro de Criança" – 01:10

== Personnel ==
- Kiko Loureiro – guitar, classical guitar, percussion, keyboards, piano and bass
- Mike Terrana – drums
