= Aurora Consurgens (album) =

Studio album by Angra
- Released: October 30, 2006
- Recorded: House of Audio (Germany); Via Musique Estúdios (Brazil)
- Genres: Power metal; progressive metal
- Length: 50:42
- Label: Paradoxx Music / SPV
- Producer: Dennis Ward

Angra chronology
Temple of Shadows (2004)	Aurora Consurgens (2006)	Aqua (2010)

Professional ratings
Review scores
Source	Rating
AllMusic	3.5/5 stars
Lords of Metal	(8.5/10)
About.com	3.5/5 stars

Aurora Consurgens is the sixth studio album by the Brazilian power metal band Angra. It was released in October 2006 by Paradoxx Music in Brazil and SPV label Steamhammer in the rest of the world. This is the last album to feature drummer Aquiles Priester.

== Description ==
The title comes from the medieval text of the same name attributed to Thomas Aquinas, which was later used by Carl Jung for relating dreams to the different states of mind. The album is not a concept album as Temple of Shadows was, but it rather focuses all lyrics on the different mental disturbances, such as suicide, schizophrenia, sociopathy, bipolar disorder, etc. The cover was also taken from an illustration of the Aurora consurgens book.

The album is heavier than its predecessors, although maintaining the regional influences, rhythms and arrangements that mark the band. The composition process involved all members this time, resulting in more diverse music.

The drums were recorded in House of Audio Studios in Germany under the production of Dennis Ward; the remaining members were recorded in "Via Musique" studios in São Paulo, Brazil, under the co-production of Thiago Bianchi (Karma and Shaman).

A single called "The Course of Nature" was released as a virtual single for download in the band's official website.

The Japanese edition of the album comes with a bonus track, "Out of This World", which was written in honor of the first Brazilian astronaut, Marcos Pontes. It features Rafael Bittencourt for the first time on the leading vocals.

== Track listing ==
No.	Title	Lyrics	Music	Length
1.	"The Course of Nature"	Edu Falaschi	Falaschi, Kiko Loureiro	4:30
2.	"The Voice Commanding You"	Rafael Bittencourt	Bittencourt	5:27
3.	"Ego Painted Grey"	Bittencourt	Loureiro	5:38
4.	"Breaking Ties"	Felipe Andreoli	Falaschi	3:29
5.	"Salvation: Suicide"	Bittencourt	Loureiro	4:21
6.	"Window to Nowhere"	Bittencourt	Loureiro	6:02
7.	"So Near So Far"	Loureiro	Loureiro	7:09
8.	"Passing By"	Andreoli	Andreoli	6:32
9.	"Scream Your Heart Out"	Loureiro	Loureiro	4:25
10.	"Abandoned Fate"	Loureiro	Loureiro	3:09
Total length:				50:42

=== Bonus track (Japanese edition) ===
No.	Title	Lyrics	Music	Length
11.	"Out of This World"	Bittencourt	Bittencourt	4:36
Total length:				55:18

== Personnel ==
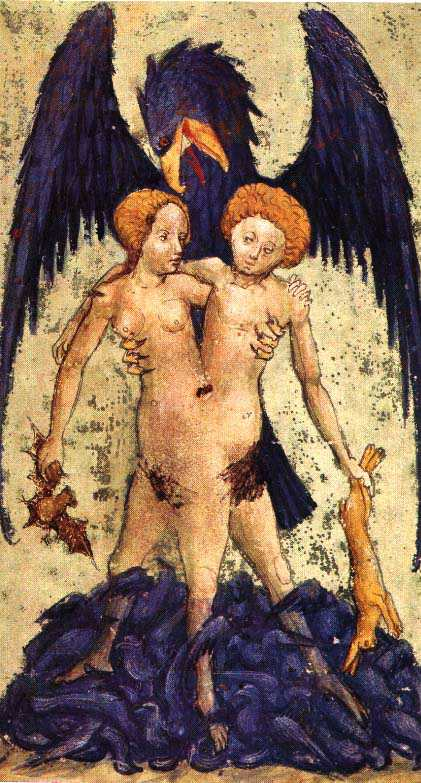
An illustration of the Aurora consurgens book, depicting an hermaphrodite. This illustration was the basis for the album's cover.

- Edu Falaschi – lead vocals except on #11
- Kiko Loureiro – guitars; keyboards & orchestral arrangements on #03, 05, 06, 07, 09, 10; bouzouki on #07
- Rafael Bittencourt – guitars; lead vocals on #11, all backing vocals, madrigal choirs on #02
- Felipe Andreoli – bass, upright bass on #10; intro guitars on #08
- Aquiles Priester – drums

Guest musicians

- Mauricio Alves – percussion
- Fabrizio Di Sarno – keyboards & orchestral arrangements on #01, 02, 04, 08
- Rita Maria – madrigal choirs on #02
- Zeca Loureiro – madrigal choirs on #02
- Patricia Zanzoti – madrigal choirs on #02

== Charts ==
Chart (2006)	Peak position
Brazilian Albums (ABPD)	14
French Albums (SNEP)	147
Japanese Albums (Oricon)	17
