= Aqua (Angra album) =

Studio album by Angra
- Released: August 11, 2010
- Recorded: February – May 2010
- Genre: Progressive metal; power metal
- Length: 49:15
- Label: JVC/Victor, SPV/Steamhammer
- Producer: Angra, Brendan Duffey and Adriano Daga

Angra chronology
Aurora Consurgens (2006)	Aqua (2010)	Secret Garden (2014)

Aqua is the seventh studio album by the Brazilian power metal band Angra. It was released on August 11, 2010 and August 17, 2010 in Japan and Brazil, respectively. It is their last recording to feature Edu Falaschi on lead vocals, and their only studio album on which drummer Ricardo Confessori returns.

== Overview ==
The album features returning drummer Ricardo Confessori, who had left the band with Andre Matos and Luís Mariutti in 2000 and had been since then replaced by Aquiles Priester.

According to guitarist Rafael Bittencourt, the album was based on William Shakespeare's The Tempest. Bittencourt also states that:

Besides all the qualities of the text, we found out that the element 'water' is one of the main characters of the history. It transforms itself during the cycles and changes the things around. It represents the rage of high tides and tempests, and then the forgiveness and wisdom in calm. Everything happens after a violent storm that occurs in the sea, in an island hill. While the wild waters come from up and down, a ship and the entire crew are fighting for surviving. As from this point, we developed one very interesting narrative that will get the attention of the listeners.

Aqua was released through major labels internationally, but in Brazil the band decided to self-release it, so that they can keep control of everything related to the album, says vocalist Edu Falaschi.

== Reception ==
Professional ratings
Review scores
Source	Rating
Allmusic	3/5 stars
Danger Dog	(4.75/5)
BW&BK	(7/10)
Black Wind Metal	4.5/5 stars

== Track listing ==
No.	Title	Lyrics	Music	Length
1.	"Viderunt te Aquæ"	(instrumental)	Rafael Bittencourt	0:59
2.	"Arising Thunder"	Edu Falaschi	Falaschi, Kiko Loureiro	4:52
3.	"Awake from Darkness"	Felipe Andreoli	Falaschi, Bittencourt, Andreoli	5:54
4.	"Lease of Life"	Falaschi	Falaschi	4:33
5.	"The Rage of the Waters"	Bittencourt	Bittencourt, Ricardo Confessori, Andreoli	5:33
6.	"Spirit of the Air"	Falaschi	Falaschi, Loureiro	5:22
7.	"Hollow"	Andreoli	Bittencourt, Andreoli	5:30
8.	"A Monster in Her Eyes"	Bittencourt	Bittencourt	5:15
9.	"Weakness of a Man"	Bittencourt, Loureiro	Bittencourt, Loureiro	6:12
10.	"Ashes"	Loureiro	Loureiro	5:05
Total length:				49:15

=== Japanese bonus track ===
No.	Title	Lyrics	Music	Length
11.	"Lease of Life" (different remix)	Falaschi	Falaschi	5:34
Total length:				54:49

=== Double digipack limited edition ===
==== Disc 1 ====
No.	Title	Length
1.	"Viderunt te Aquæ""	1:01
2.	"Arising Thunder"	4:52
3.	"Awake from Darkness"	5:55
4.	"Lease of Life"	4:34
5.	"The Rage of the Waters"	5:43
6.	"Spirit of the Air"	5:23
7.	"Hollow"	5:31
8.	"A Monster in Her Eyes"	5:16
9.	"Weakness of a Man"	6:13
10.	"Ashes"	5:12

==== Disc 2 (bonus disc: Edu Falaschi era) ====
No.	Title	Lyrics	Music	Length
1.	"Nova Era"	Bittencourt, Andreoli	Falaschi, Loureiro	4:52
2.	"Rebirth"	Bittencourt	Loureiro, Bittencourt	5:15
3.	"Hunters and Prey"	Bittencourt	Aquiles Priester	6:29
4.	"Spread Your Fire"	Bittencourt	Loureiro, Falaschi	4:25
5.	"Wating Silence"	Bittencourt	Loureiro, Bittencourt	4:55
6.	"The Course of Nature"	Falaschi	Falaschi, Loureiro	4:31
7.	"Salvation: Suicide"	Bittencourt	Loureiro	4:22

=== LP ===
==== Side one ====
No.	Title	Length
1.	"Viderunt te Aquæ""	1:01
2.	"Arising Thunder"	4:52
3.	"Awake from Darkness"	5:55
4.	"Lease of Life"	4:34

==== Side two ====
No.	Title	Length
5.	"The Rage of the Waters"	5:43
6.	"Spirit of the Air"	5:23
7.	"Hollow"	5:31

==== Side three ====
No.	Title	Length
8.	"A Monster in Her Eyes"	5:16
9.	"Weakness of a Man"	6:13
10.	"Ashes"	5:12

==== Side four (bonus tracks) ====
No.	Title	Length
1.	"Nova Era"	4:52
2.	"Spread Your Fire"	4:25
3.	"The Course of Nature"	4:31

== Personnel ==
- Edu Falaschi – vocals
- Kiko Loureiro – guitars, choirs
- Rafael Bittencourt – guitars, choirs
- Felipe Andreoli – bass, additional guitars on #04, choirs
- Ricardo Confessori – drums, additional percussion

=== Additional musicians ===
- Amon Lima – violin on #01, 03, 06, 07, 08
- Yaniel Matos – cello on #01, 03, 07, 08
- Guga Machado – percussion on #03, 04, 05, 06, 08, 09, 10
- Maria Ilmoniemi – piano on #04, 08, 10; hammond organ on #04
- Fabrizio di Sarno – keyboards and orchestration on #05
- Nei Medeiros – keyboards and orchestration on #01, 08
- Felipe Grytz – keyboards and orchestration on #02, 04, 06, 10
- Fernanda Gianesella – choirs on #01, 06, 09
- Miriam Chiurciu – choirs on #01, 06, 09
- Gisela Freire – choirs on #01, 06, 09
- Isa Elisabetsky – choirs on #01, 06, 09
- Katya Delfino – choirs on #01, 06, 09
- Zuma Duarte – choirs on #01, 06, 09
- Luiza Gianesella – choirs on #01, 06, 09
- Debora Reis – choirs on #10
- Annah Flavia – choirs on #04
- Tito Falaschi – choirs on #01, 06, 09
- Zeca Loureiro – choirs on #01, 09
- Rodrigo Ninrod – choirs on #01

=== Technical ===
- Angra – producer
- Brendan Duffey – producer, engineer, mixer
- Adriano Daga – producer, engineer, mixer
- Thiago "Hóspede" – engineer
- Maor Appelbaum – mastering

== Charts ==
Chart (2010)	Peak position
Brazilian Albums (ABPD)	11
French Albums (SNEP)	147
Japanese Albums (Oricon)	22
