= Temple of Shadows =

Studio album by Angra
- Released: September 6, 2004
- Recorded: January–July 2004
- Studios: Mosh Studios, São Paulo, Brasil, The House of Audio, Germany
- Genres: Progressive metal; power metal; neoclassical metal
- Length: 66:53
- Labels: Paradoxx Music; SPV/Steamhammer
- Producer: Dennis Ward

Angra chronology
Rebirth (2001)	Temple of Shadows (2004)	Aurora Consurgens (2006)

Professional ratings
Review scores
Source	Rating
AllMusic	4/5 stars
Blabbermouth	8.5/10 stars
Novo Metal	9.5/10 stars
Whiplash	10/10 stars

Temple of Shadows is the fifth studio album by the Brazilian power metal band Angra, released in 2004 by Paradoxx Music in Brazil and SPV label Steamhammer in the rest of the world. SPV also released a limited edition containing a bonus DVD with the complete video material of the concert that was previously released on their album Rebirth World Tour – Live in São Paulo. The record was classified as a concept album and the 21st best power metal album of all time by the metal magazine Loudwire.

== Track listing ==
All lyrics are written by Rafael Bittencourt

No.	Title	Music	Length
1.	"Deus Le Volt!" ((instrumental))	Kiko Loureiro	0:54
2.	"Spread Your Fire"	Loureiro, Edu Falaschi	4:27
3.	"Angels and Demons"	Loureiro, Falaschi	4:12
4.	"Waiting Silence"	Loureiro, Rafael Bittencourt	4:57
5.	"Wishing Well"	Falaschi	4:01
6.	"The Temple of Hate" (feat. Kai Hansen)	Loureiro	5:15
7.	"The Shadow Hunter"	Loureiro, Bittencourt	8:08
8.	"No Pain for the Dead" (feat. Sabine Edelsbacher)	Loureiro, Bittencourt	5:07
9.	"Winds of Destination" (feat. Hansi Kürsch)	Loureiro, Bittencourt	6:58
10.	"Sprouts of Time"	Loureiro	5:11
11.	"Morning Star"	Loureiro, Bittencourt	7:41
12.	"Late Redemption" (feat. Milton Nascimento)	Loureiro, Nascimento	4:57
13.	"Gate XIII" ((instrumental))	Loureiro, Falaschi, Bittencourt	5:05
Total length:			66:53

== Story ==
The 13 tracks tell a story written by guitarist Rafael Bittencourt about the life of a crusader in the 11th century - known as The Shadow Hunter - questioning the ideals of the Catholic Church.

- "Deus Le Volt!", Spread Your Fire: The story starts as a man, later named the Shadow Hunter, is chosen by God as a Jewish Rabbi tells him his fate.
- "Angels and Demons": As he accepts his destiny, the Shadow Hunter goes off to spread a new belief, against the teachings of the Catholic Church, who define him as a heretic.
- "Waiting Silence": As time passes, the Shadow Hunter falls in love with a Muslim lady and has two sons. He is conflicted by his choice between filling out his destiny or living a normal life. As his anxiety builds, the Crusaders of the Roman Catholic Church attack the city the family lives in.
- "Wishing Well": Completely separate from the coming battle, this vignette carries through the Shadow Hunter's mind, as the Rabbi's voice constantly replays itself, telling him "No matter where you throw your coins, whether it be in a church or a well, it's your faith! If there is a God, he has no home: He is everywhere!"
- "Temple of Hate": Jerusalem is stormed by an army of the Holy Roman Church, in correspondence with the real event occurring in July 1099, and overcome with their zeal for Christianity, annihilate every single inhabitant. The Shadow Hunter's wife and two children are killed in this attack. The Reign of Jerusalem was founded upon the fanatic, intolerant and ignorant ideals of The Temple of Hate, against the will of those who lived in the Holy Land before their invasion.

"The entire population of the Holy city was put to the sword, Jews as well as Muslims, 70,000 men, women and children perished in a holocaust which raged for three days. In places men waded in blood up to their ankles and horsemen were splashed by it as they rode through the streets. Weeping, these devout conquerors went barefoot to pray at the Holy Sepulcher before rushing eagerly back to the slaughter." - Desmond Sweard, The Monks of War.

- "The Shadow Hunter": The Shadow Hunter continues his travels and runs across a Gypsy prostitute. Instead of giving him pleasure, she reads him cards, telling him love will drag him from his path. The Shadow Hunter, seeking answers to questions that plague him, is even more baffled by the woman. At this point, he also discovers the death of his family.
- "No Pain for the Dead": Continuing from the previous song, The Shadow Hunter buries his family, overcome with loss and sadness, but is comforted by knowing they are free from mortal suffering and emotions. He then questions whether all this has been worth doing.
- "Winds of Destination": Some time passes and he ends up in the assault of Xerigordon Fortress, held up by Kilij Arslan. During the conquest of Xerigordon Fortress, The Shadow Hunter is injured and has to run away to escape from the troops of Kilij Arslan. Losing blood, he collapses before getting back to Constantinople. While unconscious, he dreams about the lost scrolls hidden in the ruins of the Temple of Solomon and inside lost caves by the Dead Sea.
- "Sprouts of Time": The Shadow Hunter starts a new religion, gathering people around him to spread the truth revealed for him. Words of peace and love were sown like seeds in the hearts of the wise, but fruitlessly dropped on the rocky soil of the hearts of the blind. The future is a consequence of what we do now. The present exposes the Sprouts of Time to everyone. It is unclear whether this actually happens, or if he is hallucinating this event, as the next song states that he is just waking up.
- "Morning Star": When he wakes up, two Muslim men are carrying him away on a type of hammock hanging on a long piece of wood. Weak and frightened, he can't react. Right above his head, while the sun is dawning, the Morning Star shines in the new day's sky. The six-pointed star presents a cross and the trident together as one. He understands the first sign given to him by the Rabbi as the wolves are howling. At that very moment, the first prophecy is accomplished. He will find out later that the two men are brothers. Inside, their sister, named Laura, will tend to his wounds. As he finds strength to move again, the Shadow Hunter waits for dawn as it seems the Morning Star is giving him the chance to decide whether he lives or dies.
- "Late Redemption": On his deathbed, whether it is immediately after this or some time in the future, the Shadow Hunter is still in doubt about the long journey which has brought him here; he remains beset by the questions: "Was I right? Was I wrong?" Memories and thoughts twist his mind. As death approaches, the Hunter is visited by angels - or are they demons? Who knows? How can the purest heart judge evil? The Angel of Death stretches his arms and offers a comfortable eternal silence. The Shadow Hunter delivers his body and soul, sure of his Late Redemption.
- "Gate XIII" is an orchestral instrumental, reprising riffs, progressions, and other musical themes from many of the other songs, symbolizing that as life lives by taking the lives of others, one life ends, more life begins. The snake eats its tail.

== Personnel ==
- Edu Falaschi – lead vocals
- Kiko Loureiro – guitars, keyboards
- Rafael Bittencourt – guitars, keyboards, backing vocals
- Felipe Andreoli – bass, backing vocals
- Aquiles Priester – drums, percussion

Technical staff

- Dennis Ward – producer, recorder, engineer, mixing
- Jürgen Lusky – mastering

== Guest appearances ==
The album is featured by several guest musicians:

- Fábio Laguna – keyboards, orchestration on track 11
- Sabine Edelsbacher of Edenbridge – co-lead vocals on No Pain for the Dead, backing vocals on Spread Your Fire
- Kai Hansen of Helloween and Gamma Ray – co-lead vocals on The Temple of Hate
- Hansi Kürsch of Blind Guardian – co-lead vocals on Winds of Destination
- Milton Nascimento – co-lead vocals on Late Redemption
- Tobias Sammet of Edguy - co - lead vocals on Morning Star

== Additional information ==
- Gate XIII is not in promotional releases, but it is part of the album.

== Charts ==
Chart (2004)	Peak position
Brazilian Albums (ABPD)	10
French Albums (SNEP)	110
Japanese Albums (Oricon)	22
