= Angels Cry (album) =

Studio album by Angra
- Released: 3 November 1993
- Recorded: July–September 1993
- Studios: Hansen Studios and Horus Sound Studio, Hamburg, Germany
- Genres: Power metal; progressive metal
- Length: 55:48
- Labels: Eldorado, Victor, Polydor
- Producers: Charlie Bauerfeind, Sascha Paeth

Angra chronology
Reaching Horizons (1993)	Angels Cry (1993)	Holy Land (1996)

Professional ratings
Review scores
Source	Rating
AllMusic	4/5 stars
Metal Storm	8.6/10
Scream Magazine	5/6

Angels Cry is the debut studio album by the Brazilian power metal band Angra. It was released in 1993 and recorded in Germany at Kai Hansen's studios in Hamburg.

The opening track is a short rendition of the first movement of Franz Schubert's "Symphony No. 8", commonly known as his "Unfinished Symphony". In addition, the title track features a brief arrangement of "Caprice no. 24" by Niccolò Paganini, whereas "Evil Warning" features a brief arrangement of "Winter" by Antonio Vivaldi. The opening of the track "Never Understand" features a brief arrangement of the song "Asa Branca" by Luiz Gonzaga. The opening section of the closing track "Lasting Child", entitled "The Parting Words", is an adaptation of the theme of Felix Mendelssohn's "Variations sérieuses", Op. 54.

== Production and recording ==
When commenting on the production and recording of the album, vocalist Andre Matos said that recording the album was difficult due to the inexperience of him and his bandmates, and also due to the difference of musical influences between them and the producers. He also referred to the recording as "an exile":

We were there for months old until the album was taking a final shape. And it was kind of creepy also. [...] we were recording this album at Kai Hansen's studio in Hamburg, the Gamma Ray studio. And it happened that the studio sat inside a Second World War bunker. There were no windows, there was no air, there was no light. So it was a strange atmosphere for this first album that we did in Germany, but in the end everything went out okay.

Producer Charlie Bauerfeind was not confident that drummer and co-founder Marcos Antunes would be skillful enough for the music he expected to put in the album, so he told the band they could either fire him and hire Alex Holzwarth as a session musician or use electronic drums - or otherwise he would leave the project. The band decided to do as he said and replaced Antunes with Holzwarth, a decision Matos regards as being very difficult.

One of the songs, however, was performed by a different drummer: Kate Bush cover "Wuthering Heights", played by then Gamma Ray drummer Thomas Nack. Matos said Nack was a big fan of Bush and "could play those lines perfectly".

The inlays and photo shoots for the album display drummer Ricardo Confessori, but he would only join the band after its recording. Antunes appears on the back sleeve and inlays of the Japanese first press of the album instead of Confessori.

=== Cover ===
The album cover depicts a reproduction of an angel statue, which can be found at Cemitério São Paulo, in a wheat field under a red sky. The image was composed by Alberto Torquato and Paulo Caciji and the album liner notes credit Matos for the concept, as he knew the statue from his school times. However, guitarist Rafael Bittencourt claims to be the original author, because even before Matos joined the band he already envisioned a cover with an angel statue.

== Track listing ==
All lyrics are written by Andre Matos except Stand Away by Rafael Bittencourt and Wuthering Heights by Kate Bush.

No.	Title	Music	Length
1.	"Unfinished Allegro"	Franz Schubert, Matos	1:13
2.	"Carry On"	Matos	5:05
3.	"Time"	Bittencourt	5:57
4.	"Angels Cry"	Bittencourt	6:48
5.	"Stand Away"	Bittencourt	4:57
6.	"Never Understand"	Bittencourt	7:50
7.	"Wuthering Heights" (Kate Bush cover)	Kate Bush	4:39
8.	"Streets of Tomorrow"	Loureiro, Matos	5:03
9.	"Evil Warning"	Bittencourt	6:42
10.	"Lasting Child: I. "The Parting Words"; II. "Renaissance""	Matos	7:34: 4:00; 3:34
Total length:			55:48

1999 bonus tracks
No.	Title	Length
11.	"Evil Warning" (Different Vocals)	6:40
12.	"Angels Cry" (Re-mix)	6:48
13.	"Carry On" (Re-mix)	5:09
Total length:		74:25

== Personnel ==
=== Band members ===
- André Matos – lead vocals, keyboards, piano and cover concept
- Kiko Loureiro – lead and rhythm guitars
- Rafael Bittencourt – rhythm and lead guitars
- Luís Mariutti – bass guitar

=== Guest musicians ===
- Alex Holzwarth – drums, percussion except in Track #7
- Dirk Schlächter – lead guitar in Track #6
- Kai Hansen – lead guitar in Track #6
- Sascha Paeth – acoustic and lead guitars in Track #6

=== Additional musicians ===
- Thomas Nack – drums in track #7

== Charts ==
Chart (1993)	Peak position
Japanese Albums (Oricon)	17
