= Rebirth (Angra album) =

Studio album by Angra
- Released: November 13, 2001
- Recorded: House of Audio, Karlsdorf-Neuthard, Germany; Anonimato Studios, Brazil; June - August 2001
- Genre: Progressive metal; power metal; neoclassical metal
- Length: 52:48
- Label: Paradox Music (Brazil); SPV/Steamhammer (Germany); Victor (Japan)
- Producer: Dennis Ward

Angra chronology
Fireworks (1998)	Rebirth (2001)	Temple of Shadows (2004)

Back cover

Professional ratings
Review scores
Source	Rating
AllMusic	3/5 stars
Blabbermouth.net	(8.5/10)
Metal Storm	(8.6/10)
Sea of Tranquility	4.5/5 stars
Whiplash.net	9/10 stars

Rebirth is the fourth studio album by the Brazilian power metal band Angra, the first since a major restructuring of the band's line-up. In 2019, Metal Hammer ranked it as the 15th best power metal album of all time.

== Track listing ==
All lyrics are written by Rafael Bittencourt except Nova Era by Felipe Andreoli and Bittencourt

No.	Title	Music	Length
1.	"Nova Era. In Excelsis. Nova Era"	Loureiro, Edu Falaschi	5:56. 1:03. 4:53
2.	"Millennium Sun"	Loureiro, Bittencourt	5:11
3.	"Acid Rain"	Bittencourt	6:07
4.	"Heroes of Sand"	Falaschi	4:39
5.	"Unholy Wars: I. "Imperial Crown"; II. "Forgiven Return""	Loureiro, Bittencourt	8:13
6.	"Rebirth"	Loureiro, Bittencourt	5:17
7.	"Judgement Day"	Loureiro, Falaschi, Aquiles Priester	5:40
8.	"Running Alone"	Bittencourt	7:14
9.	"Visions Prelude" (Adapted from Chopin's Op. 28 No. 20 in C minor)	Loureiro	4:32
Total length:			52:49

=== Bonus track for Japan ===
No.	Title	Music	Length
11.	"Bleeding Heart"	Falaschi	4:04
Total length:			56:52

== Personnel ==
Band members

- Edu Falaschi – lead and backing vocals, vocal arrangements
- Kiko Loureiro – guitars, acoustic guitar on "Rebirth", backing vocals, keyboard arrangements
- Rafael Bittencourt – guitars, acoustic guitar on "Rebirth", backing vocals, keyboard arrangements, strings and vocal arrangements
- Felipe Andreoli – bass, backing vocals
- Aquiles Priester – drums

Additional musicians

- Gunter Werno – piano, keyboards
- Andre Kbelo, Zeka Loureiro, Maria Rita, Carolin Wols – backing vocals
- Roman Mekinulov – cello
- Douglas Las Casas – percussion
- Mestre Dinho & Grupo Woyekè – Maracatu voices on "Unholy Wars"

Production

- Dennis Ward – producer, engineer, mixing, choir arrangements
- Andre Kbelo – assistant engineer
- Jürgen Lusky – mastering
- Antonio D. Pirani – executive producer

== Charts ==
Chart (2001)	Peak position
French Albums (SNEP)	74
Japanese Albums (Oricon)	18
