= Aquiles Priester =

South African-Brazilian drummer (born 1971)

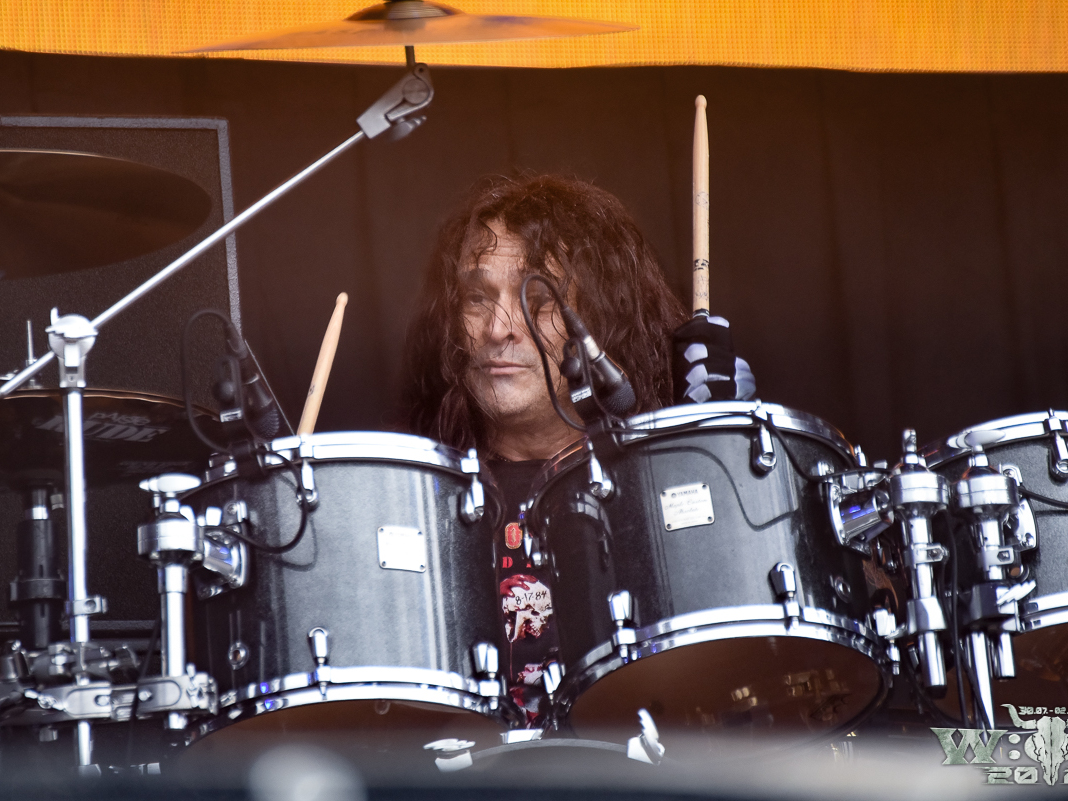
- Priester in 2025
- Born: 25 June 1971 (age 55); Outjo, South West Africa (now Outjo, Namibia)
- Citizenship: Brazil
- Occupation: Drummer
- Years active: 1987–present
- Musical career
- Origin: São Paulo, Brazil
- Genres: Heavy metal; progressive metal; power metal; speed metal; thrash metal; melodic death metal; symphonic metal
- Instrument: Drum kit
- Member of: Hangar; All Metal Stars; W.A.S.P; Midas Fate; Tony MacAlpine; Gustavo Carmo
- Formerly of: Angra; Edu Falaschi; Freakeys; Paul Di'Anno; Primal Fear; DragonForce; Vinnie Moore; Noturnall; House of Bones; Apocalipse Now
- Website: aquilespriester.com

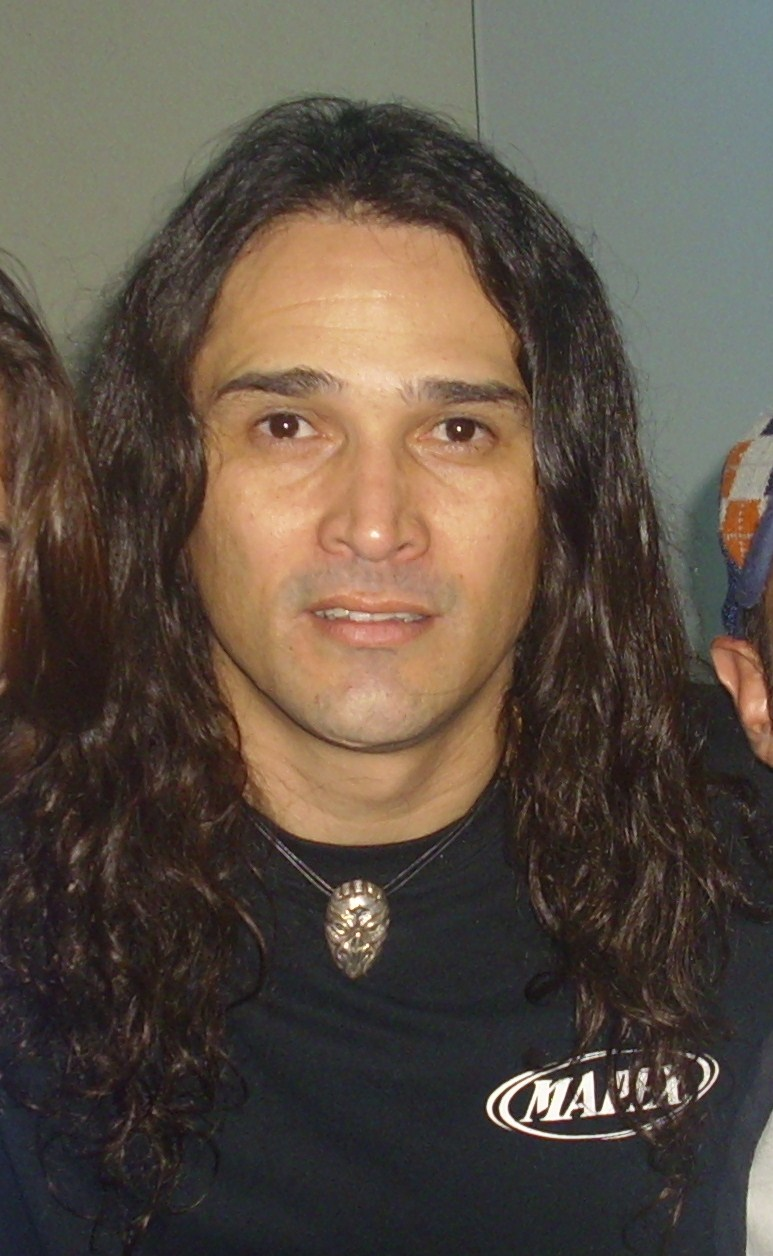
Priester in 2011

Aquiles Priester (Brazilian Portuguese pronunciation: [aˈkiliʃ ˈpɾisteʁ], Afrikaans: [aˈkələs ˈpriester]; born 25 June 1971) is a Brazilian drummer, clinician, educator, and producer. He is currently the drummer of Brazilian power metal band Hangar and progressive metal band Midas Fate. As a tour drummer, Priester has played with Paul Di'Anno, Vinnie Moore, Tony MacAlpine, W.A.S.P. and DragonForce. From 2001 to 2007, he was the drummer of Angra, recording three albums which were certified gold. And in 2013 to 2018, he was also a drummer of Noturnall, recording three albums like Noturnall, Back To Fuck You Up!, and 9.

== Biography ==
Priester was born in Outjo, South West Africa (now Namibia) to Brazilian parents. His first exposure to the instrument was at age four while watching a jazz ensemble perform on television.

He moved to Brazil in 1977, and played football in teams like Foz do Iguaçu in Paraná, ABC, and Guairacá Flamenguinho until 1985. In 1985 he attended the Rock in Rio festival where he decided to become a drummer. Although he began playing on cans, he would eventually assemble a set consisting of a snare, tom (which he borrowed from his school), bass drum, hihat, and a cymbal, which he hung from his roof. His biggest influences are Nicko McBrain of Iron Maiden and Deen Castronovo of Journey.

A local television band called The Tropical Band observed his performances and invited him to play a couple of songs; later the band Stylo Livre (freestyle) recruited him. Priester would struggle for years to come, but eventually find success with metal outfits throughout Brazil, and eventually receive the chance to audition for Angra, in 2000.

A notable student of Priester was Eloy Casagrande, who is currently the drummer of nu-metal band Slipknot.

In 2006, Priester participated in Fábio Laguna's Freakeys project.

He continued to play with Angra until their hiatus at the end of 2007 but eventually left the band to focus on his other band, Hangar. In 2010, he auditioned, along with six other drummers, for the chance to replace Dream Theater's former drummer, Mike Portnoy. The band ultimately decided to hire Mike Mangini as their new drummer.

In 2013, it was announced that Priester had joined the prog metal band Midas Fate.

On 9 September 2014, Priester was announced as Primal Fear's new drummer on the band's official Facebook page but left the band only months after.

In January 2018, he left Noturnall where he is replaced by Henrique Pucci at the same year, along with Leo Mancini.

Following after he left Noturnall, he also left Edu Falaschi's solo band, where he got replaced by Jean Gardinalli from the bands Eigenflame, Luttera, and Northtale in May 2024.

== Equipment ==
Priester has used Mapex Drums since 2001. He also endorses: Paiste Cymbals, Roland, AKG Microphones, JBL, Gibraltar Hardware, Evans Drum Heads, Pro-Mark Sticks, LP Percussion, Planet Waves, Czarcie Kopyto Pedals, Boss, Ahead Armor Drum Cases, Xtreme Ears, Urban Boards PsychoShoes, Power Click, Consulado do Rock and Lady Snake Rock Wear.

== Live musician ==
- Almah (2007)
- Tony MacAlpine (2012–present)
- Vinnie Moore (2013)
- Primal Fear (2014–2015)
- W.A.S.P. (2017–present)
- Edu Falaschi (2017–2024)
- DragonForce (2020)

== Discography ==
=== With Angra ===
- Rebirth (2001)
- Hunters and Prey (EP) (2002)
- Rebirth World Tour: Live in São Paulo (2003)
- Temple of Shadows (2004)
- Aurora Consurgens (2006)

=== With Di'Anno ===
- Nomad (2000)

=== With Freakeys ===
- Freakeys (2006)

=== With Hangar ===
- Last Time (1999)
- Inside Your Soul (2001)
- The Reason of Your Conviction (2007)
- Last Time Was Just the Beginning (2008)
- Infallible (2009)
- Acoustic, but Plugged In! (2011)
- The best of 15 years: Based on a true history (2014)
- Stronger Than Ever (2016)
- Live in Brusque/SC Brazil (DVD) (2016)

=== With Noturnall ===
- Noturnall (2014)
- First Night Live (Live DVD) (2014)
- Back to F*ck You up! (2015)
- 9 (2017)

=== With House Of Bones ===
- House Of Bones EP(2012)

=== With About 2 Crash ===
- About 2 Crash EP (2015) (only digital)

=== With Serj Buss ===
- Liquid Piece of Me (2007)

=== With Tony MacAlpine ===
- Concrete Gardens (2015)

=== With Edu Falaschi ===
- The Glory of the Sacred Truth (2018)
- Vera Cruz (2021)
- Eldorado (2023)

== Videography ==
=== As a solo artist ===
- Inside My Drums (2004)
- The Infallible Reason of my Freak Drumming (2010)
- Aquiles Priester's TOP 100 Drum Fills (2013) – Daniel Piquê as video director
- The PsychOctopus Play Along – 10 tracks of Hangar (2014)
- Our Lives, 15 Years Later… Live in Studio! (2016)
- All Access to Aquiles Priester's Drumming (2019)
- All Secrets Of Vera Cruz Drumming + Unraveling Aquiles Priester’s Double Bass Technique (2022)

=== With Hangar ===
- Live in Brusque/SC, Brazil (2016)
