= Holy Land (album) =

Studio album by Angra
- Released: March 23, 1996
- Recorded: 1995–1996
- Studios: Hansen Studio, Hamburg; Big House Studios, Hannover; HG Studio, Wolfsburg; Vox Klangstudio, Bendestorf (vocal, piano and organ recordings); Djembe Studio, São Paulo (guest performances)
- Genres: Power metal, folk metal, progressive metal
- Length: 56:59
- Label: JVC Victor/Paradoxx Music/Gravadora Eldorado
- Producers: Charlie Bauerfeind and Sascha Paeth

Angra chronology
Angels Cry (1993)	Holy Land (1996)	Fireworks (1998)

Professional ratings
Review scores
Source	Rating
AllMusic	4/5 stars

Holy Land is the second album by Brazilian metal band Angra. It is a concept album whose theme is centered on the Brazilian land by the time it was discovered in the 16th century from a European perspective, as depicted in the art surrounding the album release. Once fully opened, the cover illustration turns out to be an old 15th-century map. Title track "Holy Land" contains many indigenous and folkloric influences taken from Brazilian music, but also includes classical arrangements symbolizing Europe at the time.

The opening track "Crossing" features a rendition of O Crux Ave by Giovanni Pierluigi da Palestrina. The following songs deal with life in the "holy land" prior to its colonization by the Portuguese and subsequent changes Brazil underwent upon their arrival.

According to drummer Ricardo Confessori, for whom this album marked his studio debut with the band, the track "Nothing to Say" was developed around a drum riff he created around 1994 at a small rural property owned by guitarist Rafael Bittencourt. His band mates heard it and soon joined in to create the rest of the song, including the single-note opening riff.

== Track listing ==
No.	Title	Lyrics	Music	Length
1.	"Crossing"	(instrumental)	Giovanni Pierluigi da Palestrina	1:57
2.	"Nothing to Say"	Andre Matos	Matos, Kiko Loureiro, Ricardo Confessori	6:24
3.	"Silence and Distance"	Matos	Matos, Loureiro	5:35
4.	"Carolina IV"	Matos, Rafael Bittencourt	Bittencourt, Loureiro, Matos, Confessori, Luis Mariutti	10:37
5.	"Holy Land"	Matos	Matos	6:28
6.	"The Shaman"	Matos	Matos	5:25
7.	"Make Believe"	Bittencourt	Bittencourt, Matos	5:55
8.	"Z.I.T.O."	Bittencourt	Bittencourt, Loureiro, Matos	6:06
9.	"Deep Blue"	Matos	Matos	5:50
10.	"Lullaby for Lucifer"	Bittencourt	Loureiro, Bittencourt	2:42
Total length:				56:59

Japanese bonus track
No.	Title	Lyrics	Music	Length
11.	"Queen of the Night"	Bittencourt	Bittencourt	4:37
Total length:				61:36

Limited Edition Bonus MCD Live Acoustic at Fnac
No.	Title	Writer(s)	Length
1.	"Angels Cry"	Matos, Bittencourt	9:55
2.	"Chega de Saudade"	Antonio Carlos Jobim, Vinicius de Moraes	2:56
3.	"Never Understand"	Matos, Bittencourt	6:22
Total length:			19:13

== Personnel ==
Angra

- Andre Matos – lead vocals, piano, orchestral arrangements, keyboards, organ
- Kiko Loureiro – guitars, backing vocals, additional percussion on "Holy Land"
- Rafael Bittencourt – guitars, backing vocals, additional percussion on "Holy Land"
- Luís Mariutti – bass
- Ricardo Confessori – drums, percussion on "Holy Land"

Guests

- Alto vocals – Mônica Thiele
- Soprano vocals – Celeste Gattai
- Bass vocals – Reginaldo Gomes
- Conductor – Naomi Munakata
- Choir – The Farrambamba Vocal Group
- Computer, keyboard programming and orchestral arrangements – Sascha Paeth
- Flute – Paulo Bento
- Strings (berimbau) – Pixu Flores
- Viola – Ricardo Kubala
- Whistle, tamborim and percussive effects – Castora
- Double bass – Holger Stonjek

== Recording information ==
- Recorded at Hansen Studios in Hamburg, Big House Studios in Hannover and HG Studio in Wolfsburg, Germany 1995.
- Vocal, piano and organ recordings at Vox Klangstudio, Bendestorf, Germany 1995-1996.
- Mixed by Charlie Bauerfeind at Vox Klang Studio and Hansen Studios, January 1996.
- Engineered by Charlie Bauerfeind and Sascha Paeth
- Brazilian, Latin percussion parts and percussion (congas, djembe, timbales, claves, triangle, repinique, toms) production by Tuto Ferraz
- All guest performances recorded at Djembe Studio, São Paulo, Brazil, August/October 1995.
- Flute solo on "Carolina IV" is a citation/variation from "Bebê", a theme by Hermeto Pascoal.
- Taiko excerpts & sounds on track 5 taken from the album "Ondekoza New".
- Speech & sounds on "The Shaman" taken from the album "Musica Popular do Norte n°4".

== Charts ==
Chart (1996)	Peak position
Japanese Albums (Oricon)	17
