= Kiko Loureiro =

Brazilian guitarist

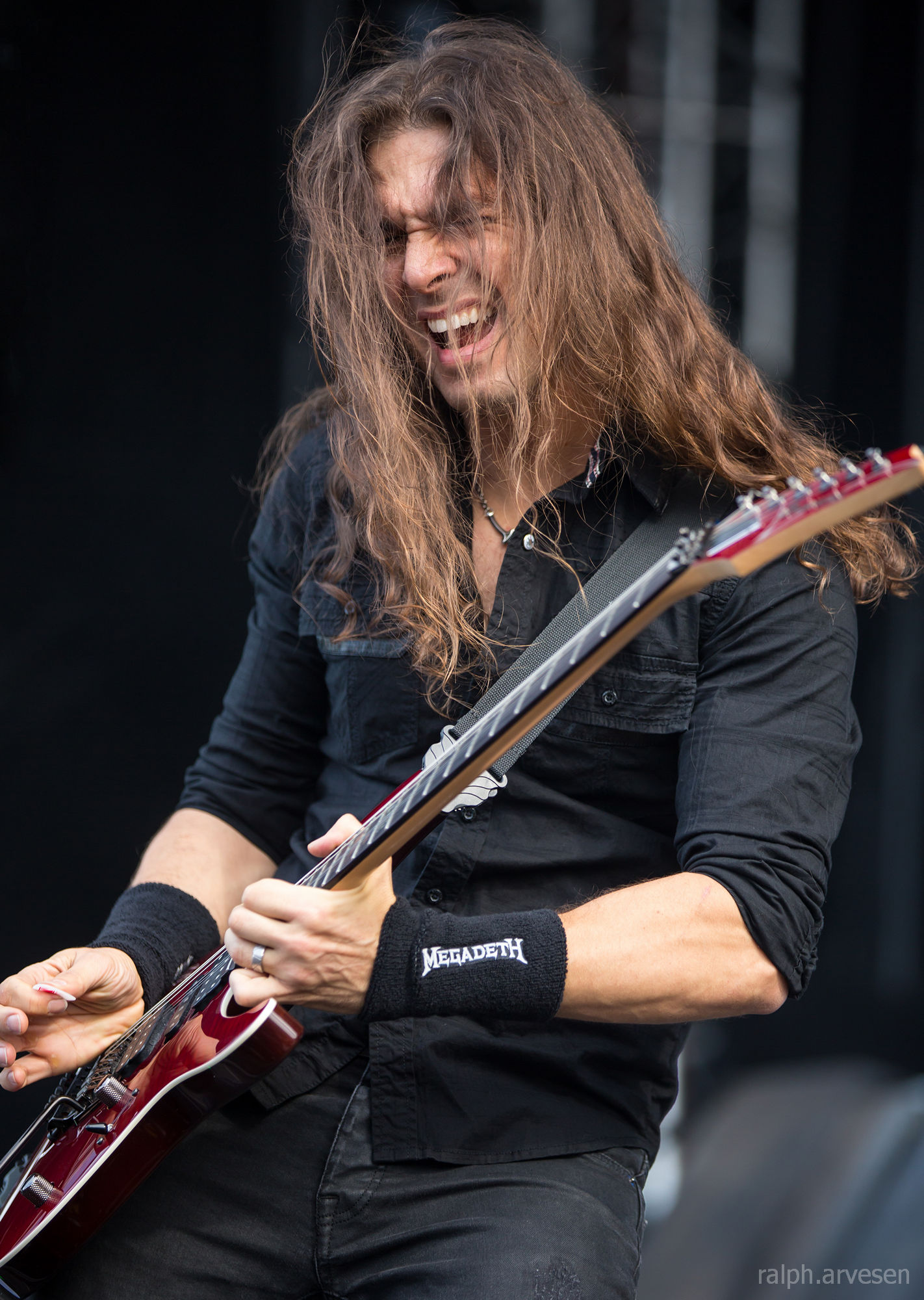
- Loureiro performing with Megadeth in 2016

Background information
- Born: Pedro Henrique Loureiro; 16 June 1972 (age 54); Rio de Janeiro, Brazil
- Genres: Power metal; progressive metal; neoclassical metal; thrash metal; jazz fusion; Eurobeat
- Occupation: Guitarist
- Years active: 1988–present
- Formerly of: Angra; Megadeth
- Website: kikoloureiro.com

Pedro Henrique "Kiko" Loureiro (Portuguese: [loˈɾejɾu]; born 16 June 1972) is a Brazilian guitarist. He has been a member of several heavy metal bands, including Angra and Megadeth.

== Career ==
Loureiro began studying music and playing acoustic guitar at age 11. He studied with two famous Brazilian musicians: Pedro Bueno and Mozart Mello. Inspired by various artists, including Eddie Van Halen, Jimmy Page, Jimi Hendrix, and Randy Rhoads, he moved to the electric guitar at 13 and by 16 had already joined two bands, Legalize (with Edu Mello on vocals, Dennis Belik on bass and Alja on drums) and A Chave, and was playing in nightclubs in São Paulo. At 19, he was invited to join the Brazilian power metal band Angra.

Due to the increase in popularity of power metal, Loureiro has become quite successful, both playing in Angra and as a solo artist.

In addition to his rock/metal achievements, Loureiro has also played guitars on several Eurobeat songs in collaboration with Dave Rodgers, including "Fevernova", "Ring of Fire" and "The Final Game".

On 2 April 2015, it was announced that Loureiro had joined the American thrash metal band Megadeth, replacing Chris Broderick.

In 2016, he alongside Dave Mustaine won Dimebag Darrell Best Guitarist award at that years Revolver Golden Gods Awards.

On 12 February 2017, Loureiro, along with Dave Mustaine, David Ellefson and Chris Adler, won the "Best Metal Performance" Grammy Award for the Megadeth song "Dystopia" at the 59th Grammy Awards.

In March 2022, Loureiro made public The Kiko Loureiro Guitar Academy, an online school offering guitar courses. Loureiro began hosting a mentorship program the same year.

Loureiro performed and co-wrote songs on Megadeth's 2022 release The Sick, the Dying... and the Dead!, which received critical appraisal.

Loureiro announced in September 2023 that he would be taking a break from Megadeth. On 19 November 2023, Loureiro announced that he was extending his break into 2024, later confirming that he had officially left Megadeth in a podcast interview on 28 November.

== Musical style ==
Loureiro is known for his technical skill on the guitar, frequently incorporating such techniques as two handed tapping, sweep picking (full swept arpeggios), alternate picking, hybrid picking, artificial and natural harmonics and combining legato and staccato in the same run or phrase. He is also well known for both his instructional and demonstration videos as well as for writing columns for and appearing on the cover of magazines Cover Guitarra, Guitar & Bass, and Young Guitar.

Despite being a right-handed guitarist, Loureiro is naturally left-handed. As such, he spends most of his pre-warmups focusing on his right-hand techniques.

== Personal life ==
Loureiro married Finnish pianist and keyboardist Maria Ilmoniemi in 2011. The two met during Loureiro's tenure in Tarja Turunen's Storm World Tour in 2008. Their first daughter was born on 29 September 2011. On 21 November 2016, they welcomed twins. The family moved to Finland in 2020.

Loureiro is a vegetarian. He has tried being a vegan in the past but he switched to vegetarianism after six months.

== Discography ==
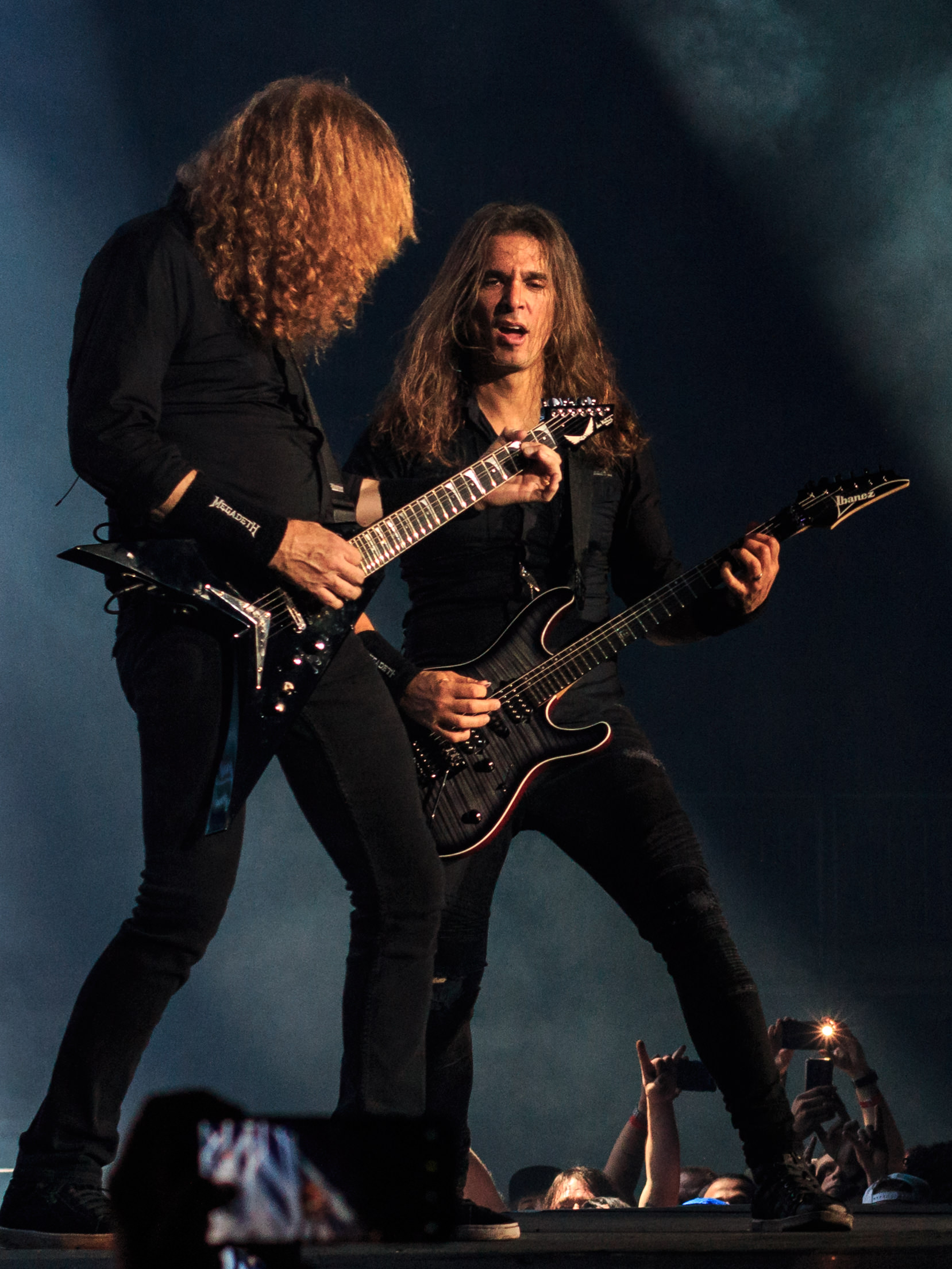
Loureiro (right) with Megadeth in 2016

Kiko Loureiro - EDM (E-Dependent Mind)

=== Solo ===
- No Gravity (2005)
- Universo Inverso (2006)
- Fullblast (2009)
- Sounds of Innocence (2012)
- The White Balance (DVD, 2013)
- Open Source (2020)
- Theory of Mind (2024)

Video lesson and instructional

- Guitarra Rock (1993)
- Os Melhores Solos e Riffs do Angra (2003)
- Tecnica e Versatilidade (2003)
- Guitarra Tecnica Para Iniciantes (2009)
- Rock Fusion Brasileiro (2009)
- Creative Fusion (2010)

=== Angra ===
- Reaching Horizons (originally released in 1992, reissued in 1997)
- Angels Cry (JVC Japan, 1993)
- Evil Warning EP (1994)
- Holy Land (Gravadora Eldorado, 1996)
  - Make Believe Part 1 single (1996)
  - Make Believe Part 2 single (1997)
  - Make Believe Part 3 single (1997)
  - Make Believe Part 4 single (1997)
- Freedom Call EP (1996)
- Holy Live live EP (1997)
- Fireworks (SPV GmbH/Century Media Records, 1998)
  - Lisbon single (1998)
  - Rainy Nights single (1998)
- Rebirth (SPV GmbH/Steamhammer, 2001)
  - Acid Rain single (2001)
- Hunters and Prey EP (SPV GmbH/Steamhammer, 2002)
- Rebirth World Tour – Live in São Paulo live album and video (BMG/Victor Entertainment, recorded in 2001 and released in 2003)
- Temple of Shadows (SPV GmbH/Steamhammer, 2004)
  - Wishing Well single (2004)
- Aurora Consurgens (SPV GmbH/Steamhammer, 2006)
  - The Course of the Nature single (2006)
- Aqua (SPV GmbH/Steamhammer, 2010)
- Angels Cry 20th Anniversary Tour (JVC/Victor Entertainment, Substantial Music, SPV/Steamhammer, 2013)
- Secret Garden (JVC, Universal Music, Edel Music, 2014)
- Ømni (2018) - guitar solo on "War Horns" as a guest
- Cycles of Pain (2023) - guitar solo on "Tears of Blood (Speed Version)" as a guest

=== Tribuzy ===
- Execution (2005)
- Execution – Live Reunion (2007)

=== Tarja ===
- My Winter Storm (2007)
- The Seer (EP) (2008)

=== Neural Code ===
- Neural Code (2009)

=== Paco Ventura ===
- Black Moon (2015) - on the song "Arabestia"

=== Megadeth ===
- Dystopia (2016)
- Warheads on Foreheads - compilation (2019)
- The Sick, the Dying... and the Dead! (2022)

| Preceded by Chris Broderick | Megadeth lead guitarist 2015–2023 | Succeeded by Teemu Mäntysaari |
