= Angra (band) =

Brazilian power metal band

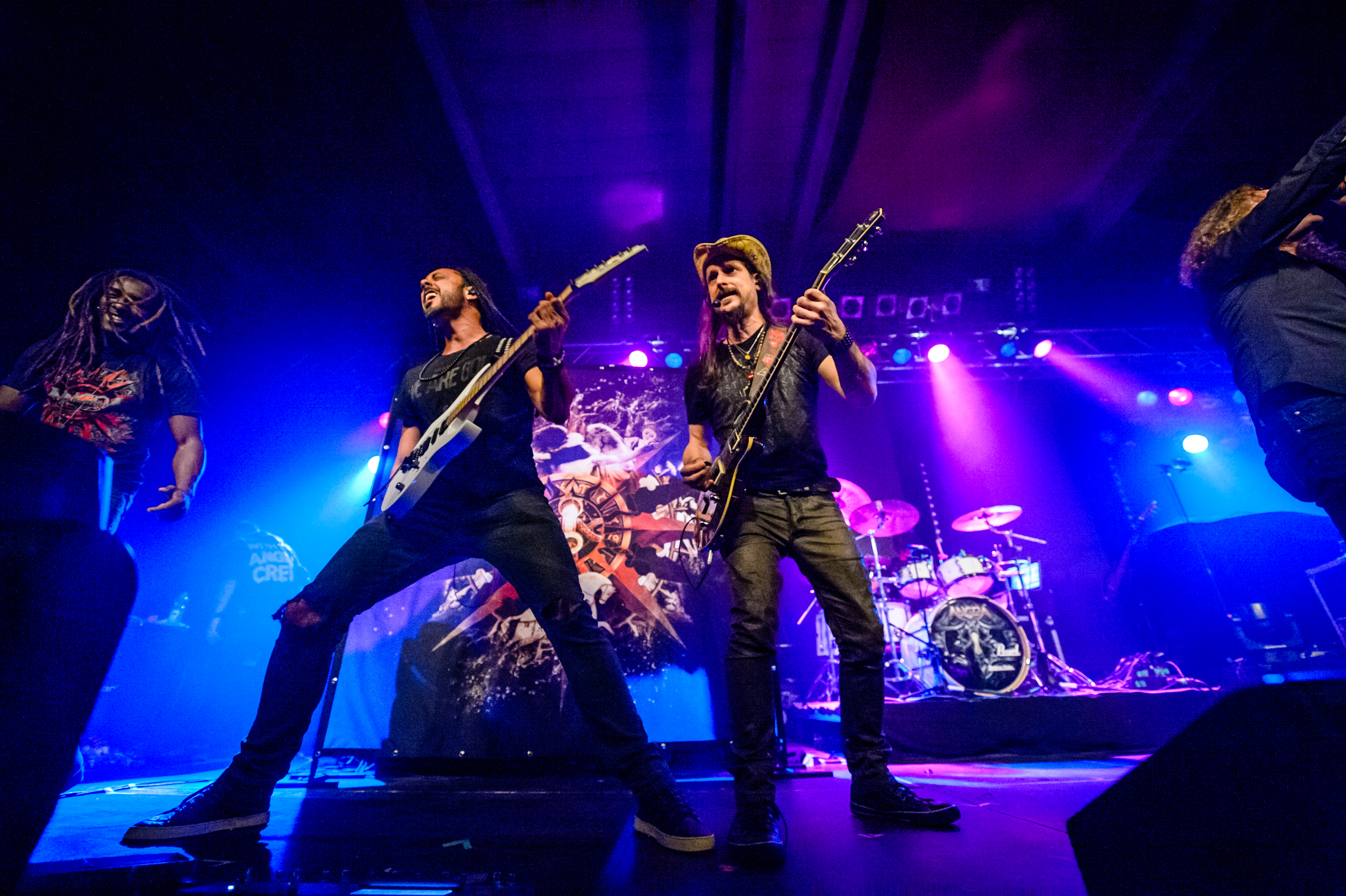
- Angra performing in 2016

Background information
- Origin: São Paulo, Brazil
- Genres: Power metal; progressive metal
- Years active: 1991-present (Note: Hiatuses: 1999–2001, 2007–2009, 2025)
- Labels: Victor Entertainment; Edel earMUSIC; SPV; Universal; Atomic Fire
- Spinoffs: Shaman
- Members: Rafael Bittencourt; Felipe Andreoli; Bruno Valverde; Marcelo Barbosa; Alirio Netto
- Past members: Andre Matos; Kiko Loureiro; André Linhares; Marco Antunes; André Lichewitz; Luis Mariutti; André Hernandes; Edu Falaschi; Aquiles Priester; Ricardo Confessori; Fabio Lione
- Website: angra.net

Angra is a Brazilian progressive and power metal band formed in 1991. They have released ten regular studio albums, six EPs, and seven live CD/DVDs to date. Led by Rafael Bittencourt, the band has gained a degree of popularity in Japan and Europe.

Emerging in the early 1990s, Angra spearheaded a national movement for melodic, progressive, and power metal. They proved that Brazilian bands could achieve technical mastery, paving the way for other melodic metal bands in Latin America and diversifying the country's musical export. Angra broke new ground by seamlessly integrating fast-paced European-style power metal and intricate progressive metal with classical music orchestration and indigenous Brazilian regional rhythms, such as baião, frevo, and maracatu. This innovative fusion, most notably showcased on their critically acclaimed early albums Angels Cry (1993) and Holy Land (1996), established a completely new paradigm within the global melodic metal subgenre.

Beyond their home country, Angra achieved international success, most notably in Japan. The Japanese market, known for its appreciation of virtuosic musicianship and neo-classical arrangements, embraced the band. During their peak, Angra achieved multiple gold records, embarked on numerous sold-out tours across the country, and became frequent cover stars on major Japanese rock magazines like Burrn!.

On 2 April 2015, guitarist Kiko Loureiro left Angra to join American thrash metal band Megadeth.

== History ==
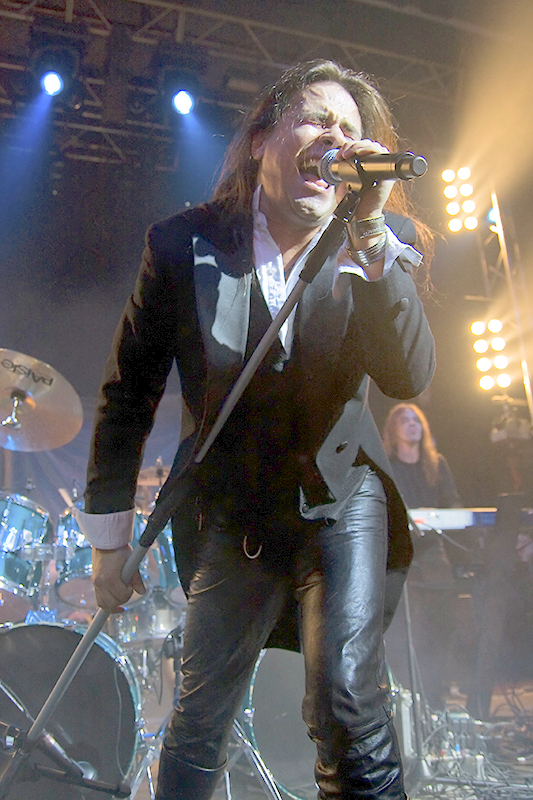
Andre Matos, original lead singer of the band

=== Formation (1991–1992) ===
Angra was formed in November 1991 by former Viper vocalist Andre Matos and guitarists Rafael Bittencourt and André Linhares, in a collaboration with music promoter and Rock Brigade magazine owner Antônio "Toninho" Pirani. The trio was joined by drummer Marco Antunes, a former bandmate of Bittencourt's, and bassist André Lichewitz - quickly replaced by Luis Mariutti. Bittencourt and Matos were the primary songwriters in the band's early days.

Early in 1992, Linhares left the band and was replaced by André Hernandes, who quit in the same year to be replaced by Kiko Loureiro. With Loureiro in the line-up, Angra recorded their first demo tape Reaching Horizons, which was released in 1993 through the German label Limb Music. Among the tracks, "Queen of the Night", originally titled "Rainha" ("Queen"), had been previously composed for Bittencourt and Antunes' previous band; and "Evil Warning" was written during Hernandes' brief stint as guitarist.

=== Angels Cry (1993–1995) ===
During the recording sessions for their first album Angels Cry, Marcos Antunes left the band. A number of session drummers, including Alex Holzwarth were used to finish the album. Ricardo Confessori was later installed as a permanent replacement. This line-up change established a stable line-up and lasted from 1993 to 2000. Angels Cry was recorded at Gamma Ray guitarist Kai Hansen's studio in Hamburg, Germany. Besides Hansen, the album included guest performances by Heavens Gate guitarist Sascha Paeth and Dirk Schlächter.

The album was released in Brazil in 1993 through Eldorado Records and contained a number of classical influences as well as a cover of Kate Bush's "Wuthering Heights". The album had some success both in Brazil as well as Japan. The band were managed by Antonio Pirani, also editor of Rock Brigade magazine. Due to the album's success in Japan, the Evil Warning EP was released in 1994 through Victor, which included remixed versions of songs "Evil Warning", "Angels Cry", "Carry On" and "Wuthering Heights". In the following year the album was made available in Germany through Dream Circle, and in France by CNR Music.

=== Holy Land (1996–1997) ===
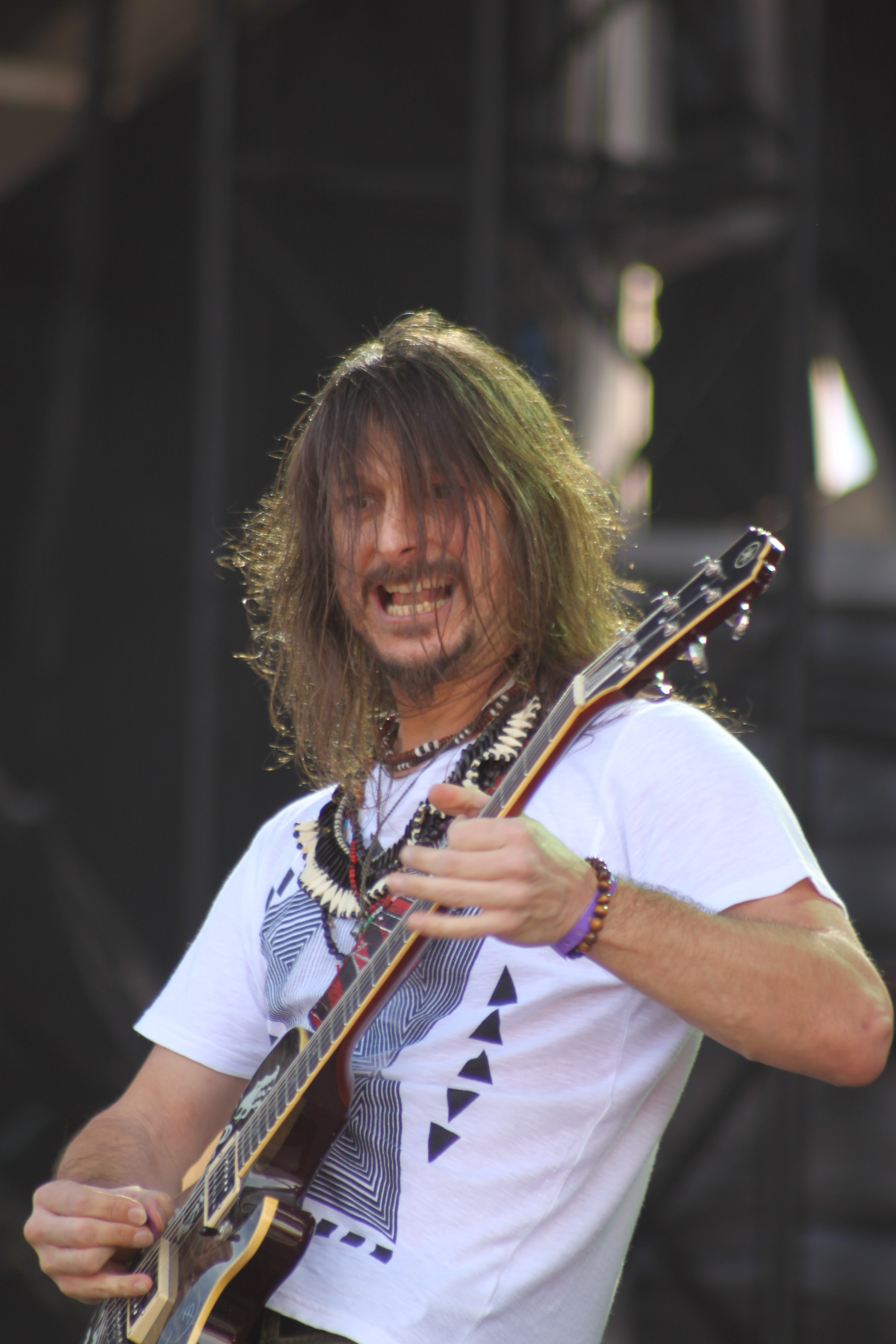
Rafael Bittencourt, guitarist and main composer

In 1996, Angra opened for AC/DC in Brazil and was invited to the inaugural Brazilian Monsters of Rock Festival. Following the festival, the band embarked on a Brazilian tour, with further dates in Europe in 1995. Holy Land - an ambitious project involving orchestration, choirs, and Brazilian rhythms - was released in 1996. The production was handled by Sascha Paeth and Charlie Bauerfiend. Holy Land proved successful and the Japanese Victor release, which included the bonus track "Queen of the Night", went gold. The band toured Japan for the first time following the album's success, while in France the single "Make Believe" was released. That same year the EP Freedom Call was released, containing cover versions of Judas Priest´s "Painkiller". After the tour in support of the album, the band released a six-track live album Holy Live, recorded in Paris in 1996. The Holy Box was released in 1998 by Lucretia Records (Italy), which included seven acoustic tracks.

=== Fireworks (1998–2000) ===
In 1998, the band released the single Lisbon, followed by the album Fireworks, produced by Chris Tsangarides. Fireworks was a departure from Angra's earlier experimental sound, focusing more on a neo-classical metal sound and lacking the Brazilian rhythms that were included in Holy Land. The album was the first for the Steamhammer label and appeared in North America through Century Media. A lengthy world tour was set up in support for the album. The band appeared at the Buenos Aires edition of Monsters of Rock, while they co-headlined shows in Europe with Time Machine and Stratovarius in 1999. Bruce Dickinson made a guest appearance during the Paris show, while the band also performed at the Wacken Open Air festival.

=== Matos' departure and Rebirth (2000–2004) ===
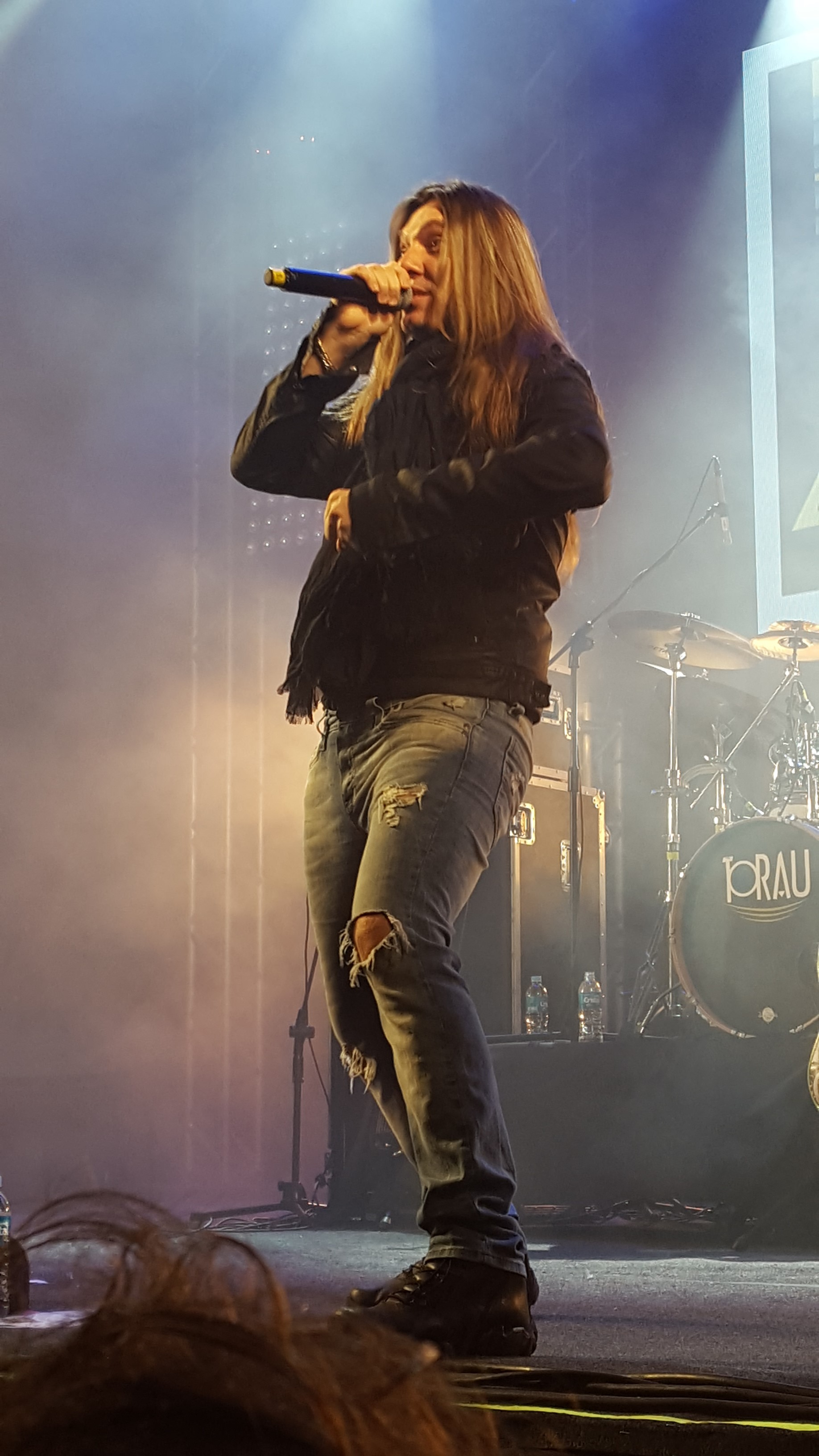
Edu Falaschi, who recorded four albums with Angra as lead singer

In August 2000, Angra split, parting ways with vocalist Andre Matos who took bassist Luis Mariutti and drummer Ricardo Confessori with him. In March 2001, the two remaining members, Kiko Loureiro and Rafael Bittencourt, announced the new line-up that included Symbols' vocalist Edu Falaschi, drummer Aquiles Priester (Hangar) and bassist Felipe Andreoli (Karma).

This line-up began recording instantly and the album Rebirth was released in 2001, produced by Dennis Ward. The album was both a critical and commercial success in Brazil and internationally, selling over 100,000 copies worldwide. The album went gold in Brazil that same year. The EP Hunters and Prey was released in 2002 which included acoustic takes of Rebirth songs, as well as other new material, a cover of "Mama" by Genesis, and their first song with lyrics in Portuguese, "Caça e Caçador" ("Hunter and Prey").

Angra would play live in Japan, appearing in Rock Machine in Spain, Wacken Open Air in Germany and ProgPower in Atlanta, Georgia, which was their first visit to the United States. Following the tour, the band submitted their version of Kashmir to the compilation The Music Remains The Same (A Metal Tribute to Led Zeppelin).

=== Temple of Shadows (2004–2006) ===
Temple of Shadows recording sessions started in January 2004 at Mosh Studios in São Paulo, once again produced by Dennis Ward. The album featured guest vocalists Kai Hansen (Gamma Ray), Sabine Edelsbacher (Edenbridge), Hansi Kürsch (Blind Guardian) and Brazilian Música popular brasileira legend Milton Nascimento. Temple of Shadows was a concept album based around a character known as The Shadow Hunter, a crusader knight disputing the expansionist ideals of the Catholic Church in the eleventh century.

The band toured Brazil and Europe, headlining shows in Southern Europe throughout Spain, Italy, and France in February 2005. For the first time since its creation, the band played at a UK show at The Mean Fiddler in London, supported by DragonForce, and later joined Finnish band Nightwish for the Japanese dates in March. The band then went to Taiwan and after, for the first time, they played in Oceania, headlining shows in Australia. Angra resumed the Brazilian tour and then returned to Europe for the Lorca Roch Festival, Live in Italy and Bull Rock Festival, sharing stages with big heavy metal names like Iron Maiden.

=== Aurora Consurgens and Confessori's return (2006–2009) ===
Later in 2006, Angra worked once again with producer Dennis Ward on their new album, entitled Aurora Consurgens, focusing on a non-concept album as Rebirth was. Instead, they pursued a close relative of the idea, a theme album. Also in 2006, Fábio Laguna composed a solo progressive instrumental album called Freakeys along with drummer Aquiles Priester and bassist Felipe Andreoli. In mid-2007, the band took a break due to an unresolved situation with its manager, who was also the owner of the Angra brand. As result, other non-resolved situations between the members arose, culminating in an indefinite hiatus until a solution was reached.

In 2008, singer Edu Falaschi was originally reported as saying that Angra "has been terminated," but this was later revealed to be both a misunderstanding and a misreporting of his words. Edu later clarified what was meant by his earlier comments: "Angra is not done; we're taking a break, a pause. The band is going through some difficult management issues, and all of us are doing our best to get back on the road." In 2009, the band's official site was taken down. Instead, the home page announced that the site was under construction and news would be released soon. In March 2009, the band's official site announced the return of drummer Ricardo Confessori after a 9-year hiatus to Angra, replacing Aquiles Priester, who left the band to dedicate full force to his band Hangar. The band went out on tour along with fellow Brazilian band Sepultura during 2009.

=== Aqua, and departure of Falaschi and Confessori (2010–2014) ===
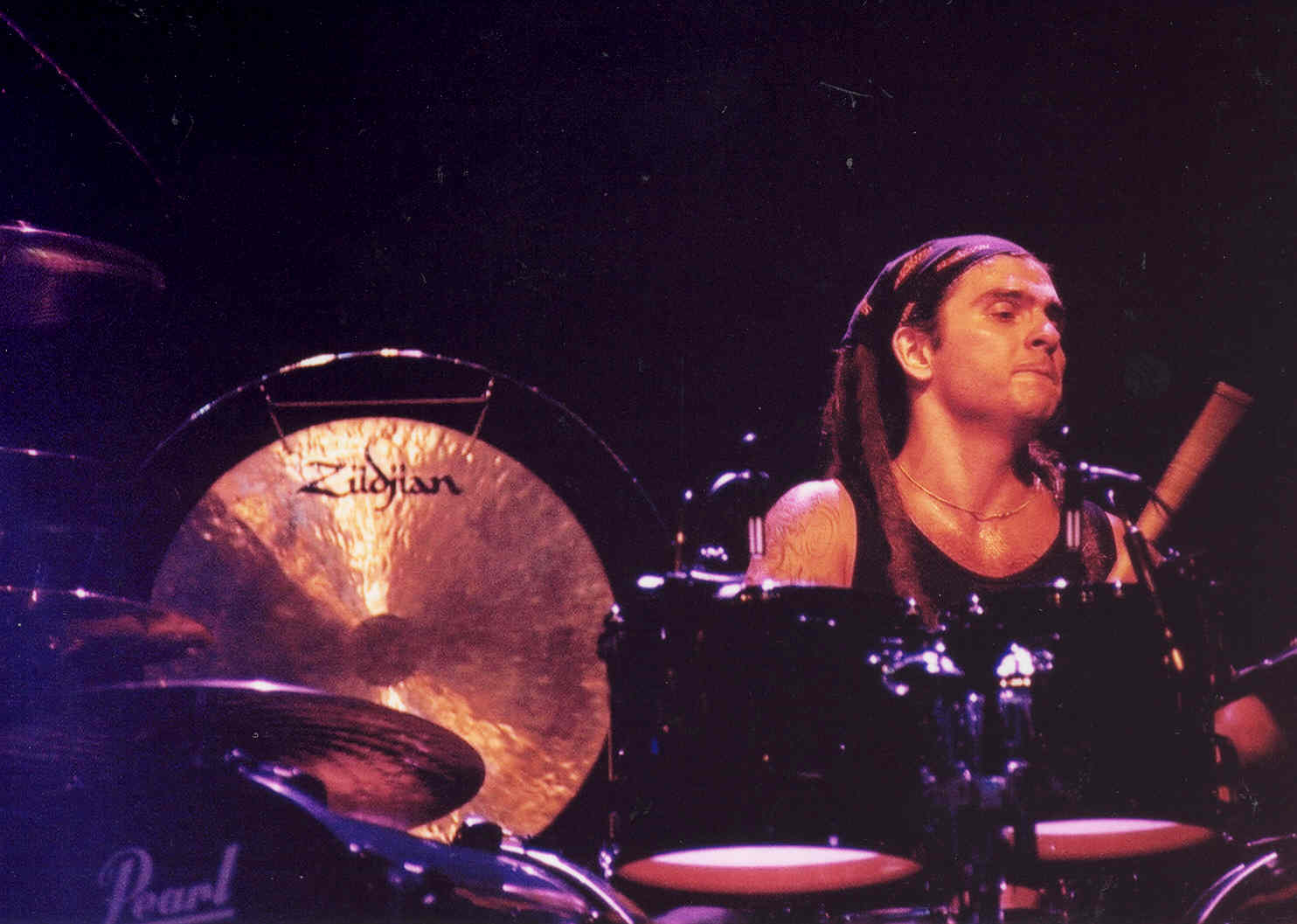
Former Angra drummer Ricardo Confessori in 2002

In the beginning of 2010, Angra started writing songs for their upcoming yet unnamed album due out in mid-2010. The album was composed partly at the members' houses and partly at Confessori's ranch, where they rehearsed and improved the arrangements of the new songs. In February, they came into Norcal Studios in São Paulo, to start recordings. The band members made home videos from the writing/recording process and released them to the fans almost weekly.

On July 5, the band unveiled the cover and track list of the new album, named Aqua. On July 10, the first single "Arising Thunder" was released. On July, 15 a new song, called "Lease of Life", was played for the first time on Brazilian radio station Kiss FM. The radio program featured an interview with Loureiro and Falaschi, followed by a high quality play of the song. On August 11, Aqua was officially released in Japan and the Aqua Tour began with a series of pocket shows, being followed by a Brazilian tour through several venues around the country.

On May 23, 2012, Edu Falaschi issued an open letter in which he announced his departure from Angra. Despite not explaining why, he said he would focus on his future projects, including Almah. Management of the band approached Matos for a possible return, but he declined. Fabio Lione (ex-Labyrinth, Rhapsody of Fire) became the third vocalist for the band.

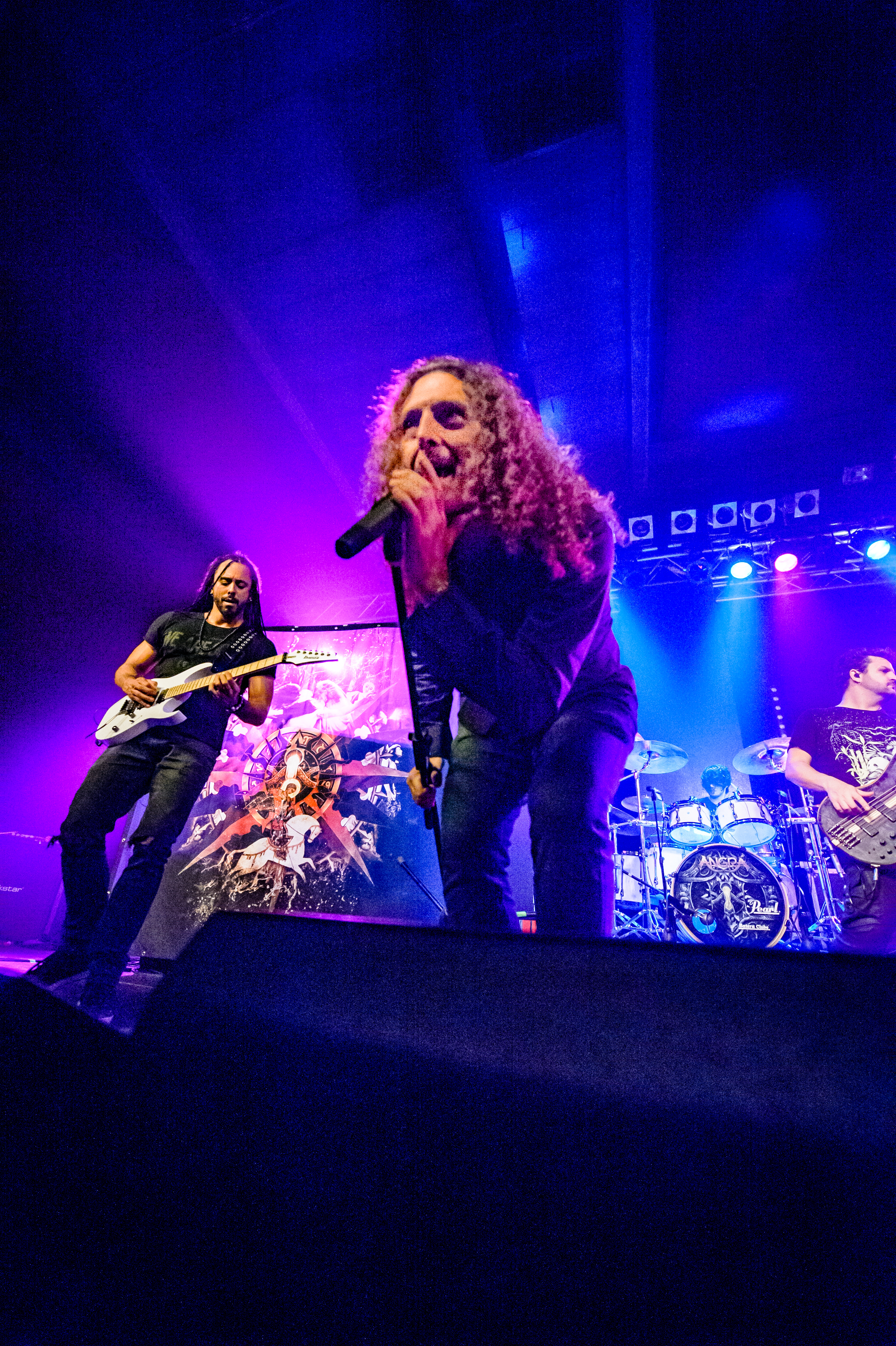
Fabio Lione performing with Angra in 2016

In 2014, drummer Ricardo Confessori announced he would end his second tenure with the band. He was later replaced by 23-year-old Bruno Valverde.

=== Secret Garden, Kiko's departure, and ØMNI (2014–2021) ===
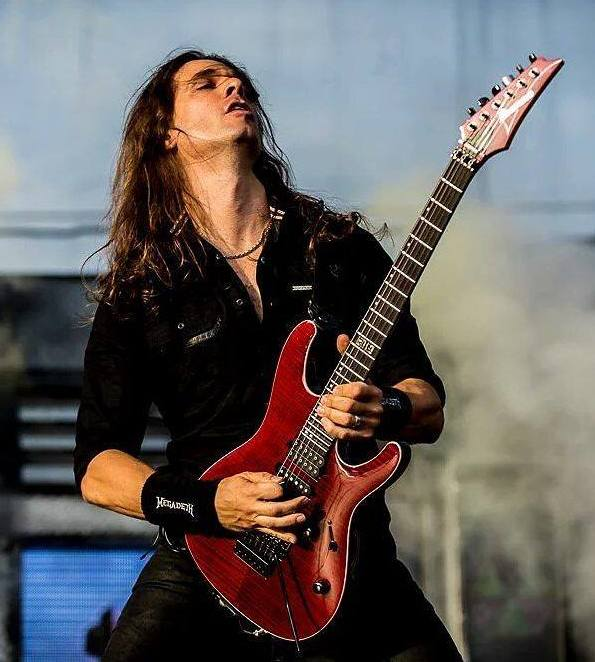
Kiko Loureiro, former guitarist of both Angra and the American thrash metal band Megadeth

In November 2014, the band announced their eighth studio album, Secret Garden, that was released on December 17 in Japan and on January 16, 2015, in Brazil and Europe. On September 19, 2015, Angra performed at Rock in Rio with special guests Doro Pesch and Dee Snider. A third, surprise guest was also announced mid-show: lead guitarist Marcelo Barbosa, who was revealed as Loureiro's touring replacement after the latter had joined Megadeth earlier in the year. The band released their ninth studio album, ØMNI, on February 16, 2018, worldwide.

Former vocalist Andre Matos died on 8 June 2019. A heart attack was cited as the cause.

In 2021, the band released a graphic novel based on the history of the album Temple of Shadows, called "O Templo das Sombras".

=== Cycles of Pain (2021–present) ===
In November 2023 Angra released their tenth album, Cycles of Pain. It was their first album with the Atomic Fire label.

On September 2, 2024, the band announced that they would take a touring and recording hiatus after finishing the tour celebrating the 20th anniversary of their album Temple of Shadows in March 2025. The band reunited for the Bangers Open Air festival on April 26, 2026, with the return of their 2001–2008 lineup that included guitarist Kiko Loureiro, drummer Aquiles Priester, and vocalist Edu Falaschi. This was the band's final performance with Fabio Lione whose departure from the band was announced on November 23. It was also the first show with new vocalist Alirio Netto.

== Musical style ==
Their musical style has been described as power metal, progressive metal, and neoclassical metal.

== Band members ==
=== Current ===
- Rafael Bittencourt – guitars, backing vocals (1991–present), occasional lead vocals, keyboards, piano (2012–present)
- Felipe Andreoli – bass, backing vocals (2001–present), keyboards (2015–present)
- Bruno Valverde – drums (2014–present)
- Marcelo Barbosa – guitars (2015–present)
- Alirio Netto – lead vocals, keyboards (2026–present)

=== Former ===
- André Linhares – guitars, backing vocals (1991–1992)
- Marco Antunes – drums (1991–1993)
- Andre Matos – lead vocals, keyboards, piano (1991–2000; died 2019)
- André Lichewitz – bass (1991)
- Luis Mariutti – bass (1991–2000)
- André "Zaza" Hernandes – guitars, backing vocals (1992)
- Kiko Loureiro – guitars, keyboards, piano, backing vocals (1992–2015, guest in 2026)
- Ricardo Confessori – drums (1993–2000, 2009–2014), backing vocals (During live shows) (1993–2000)
- Aquiles Priester – drums (2001–2008, guest in 2026)
- Edu Falaschi – lead vocals, acoustic guitar (in Unplugged shows) (2000–2012, guest 2026)
- Fabio Lione – lead vocals (2013–2026)

=== Session and touring ===
- Alex Holzwarth – drums (1993, studio)
- Fábio Ribeiro - keyboards (1992 – 1993, 1999 Fireworks tour)
- Fábio Laguna – keyboards, backing vocals (2001–2007, touring)
- Dio Lima - keyboards (2022, Rebirth 20th Anniversary Tour)

== Discography ==
=== Studio albums ===
- Angels Cry (1993)
- Holy Land (1996)
- Fireworks (1998)
- Rebirth (2001)
- Temple of Shadows (2004)
- Aurora Consurgens (2006)
- Aqua (2010)
- Secret Garden (2014)
- ØMNI (2018)
- Cycles of Pain (2023)

=== Demos ===
- Reaching Horizons (1993)

=== Extended plays ===
- Freedom Call (1996)
- Holy Live (1997)
- Hunters and Prey (2002)

=== Live/video albums ===
- Rebirth World Tour • Live in São Paulo (2002)
- Angels Cry (20th Anniversary Tour) (2013)
- ØMNI Live (2021)
- Acoustic - Live at Opera de Arame (2024)

=== Singles ===
- "Carry On" (1994)
- "Make Believe" (1996)
- "Lisbon" (1998)
- "Rainy Nights" (1998)
- "Acid Rain" (2001) (demo version)
- "Wishing Well" (2004) - No. 85 Brazilian charts
- "The Course of Nature" (2006) (free download only)
- "Arising Thunder" (2010) (free download only)
- "Lease of Life" (2010) (free download only)
- "Newborn Me" (2014) (free download only)
- "Travelers of Time" (2018)
- "Black Widow's Web" (feat Sandy Lima and Alissa White-Gluz) (2018)
- "War Horns" (feat Kiko Loureiro) (2018)
- "Hollow (Aqua 2020 Remix)" (2020)
- "Ride into the Storm" (2023)
- "Tide of Changes Part II" (feat Vanessa Moreno) (2023)
- "Gods of the World" (2023)
