= Edu Falaschi =

Brazilian heavy metal singer (born 1972)

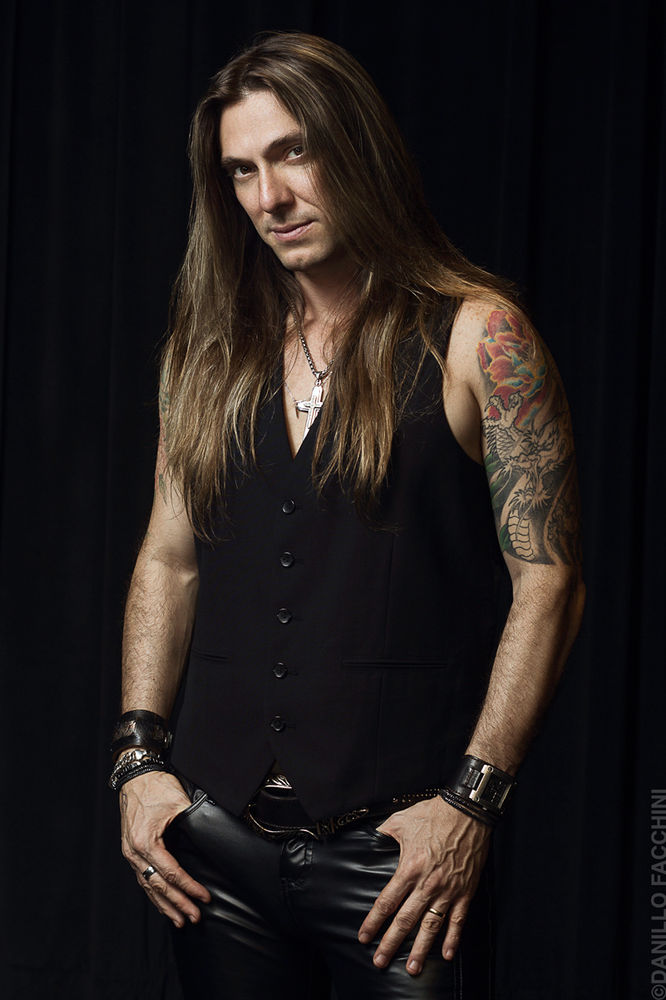
- Falaschi in 2023

Background information
- Born: Eduardo Teixeira da Fonseca Vasconcellos; May 18, 1972 (age 54); São Paulo, Brazil
- Genres: Power metal, progressive metal, neoclassical metal
- Occupations: Musician, songwriter, producer
- Instruments: Vocals, guitar, bass, drums, keyboards
- Member of: Almah
- Formerly of: Angra, Symbols, Mitrium, Venus
- Website: edufalaschi.com.br

Eduardo Teixeira da Fonseca Vasconcellos, known as Eduardo "Edu" Falaschi (born May 18, 1972), is a Brazilian musician. He is best known as the former lead singer and songwriter of São Paulo-based power metal band Angra. With Angra, Falaschi recorded four albums (Rebirth, Temple of Shadows, Aurora Consurgens, and Aqua) and an EP, Hunters and Prey.

He is also noted for his solo band Almah, which started as a side project featuring a number of guest musicians and is now his main and only band.

== Early life and first musical experiences ==
When he was one year old, Falaschi's parents moved to Rio de Janeiro, where he lived until the age of 12. His mother decided to move back to São Paulo, and then São Vicente, influenced by factors including the death of Falaschi's father.

Falaschi's first experience with music began as a child. Some of his relatives were non-professional musicians, and he used to sing with his father and uncles during family meetings. By the time he was 14 years old, he was taking guitar lessons and his interest in music increased. Although he was strongly influenced by the singers Ronnie James Dio and Bruce Dickinson, Falaschi decided to play instrumental songs instead.

He played the drums for six months in a blues band with his friends, and also played bass and guitar and sang backing vocals in a cover band. In 1989, he was invited by school friends to join a band as a singer to play at a music contest. They recorded a demo tape and played for 5,000 people. Subsequently, in 1990, some of the band members decided to form Mitrium, a rock band, in which they played their own compositions.

== Career with Mitrium ==
Mitrium began Falaschi's professional career as vocalist and composer. In 1991, they recorded their first demo tape with the song "Just Remember". Afterwards, they recorded a second demo with the songs "The Shadows" and "You Can Choose The Side of Darkness", both written by Falaschi.

The band grew quickly in São Vicente, so they decided to look for opportunities in São Paulo. There, they signed a record deal with a record company which released a split-LP called Eyes of Time with four tracks: "Eyes of Time", "Run From the Fire", "Lives So Close", and "The Shadows", all written by Falaschi.

In 1994, the heavy metal band Iron Maiden was looking for a new singer through an international contest sponsored by the band, resulting in thousands of tapes being sent in by would-be rock stars. With the increasing recognition of Mitrium, Falaschi had the chance to participate in the contest. Unexpectedly, he was one of the selected singers from Brazil along with Andre Matos, then vocalist of Angra, and later from all around the world, getting in contact with Dick Bell, production director of Iron Maiden Holding LTD. Ultimately, the band did not pick Falaschi.

Despite the professional career success, on August 5, 1994, Falaschi was forced to leave Mitrium due to personal problems. However, he continued to play for fun with his friends, and later recorded a demo with eight simple rock n' roll songs with a band called Opium.

== Career with Symbols, Angra and Almah ==
Falaschi decided to take a break for almost four years. In the middle of 1998, he was invited by the band Symbols, led by his brother Tito Falaschi, to produce their first album. Falaschi ended up producing the album and being a member of the band. While their first album, self-titled Symbols, was being released, he was invited to perform in the album Ordinary Existence by Venus. In 2000, Symbols released their second album, called Call to the End.

The Brazilian band Angra was looking for new members, and, after a trial among other vocalists, Falaschi was invited to join the band in 2000. In2012, Falaschi left Angra due to health issues and problems within the band.

In 2006, under the project name Almah, he released his first solo album, self-titled. In 2008, as a full band, Almah released their second album, Fragile Equality.

== Discography ==
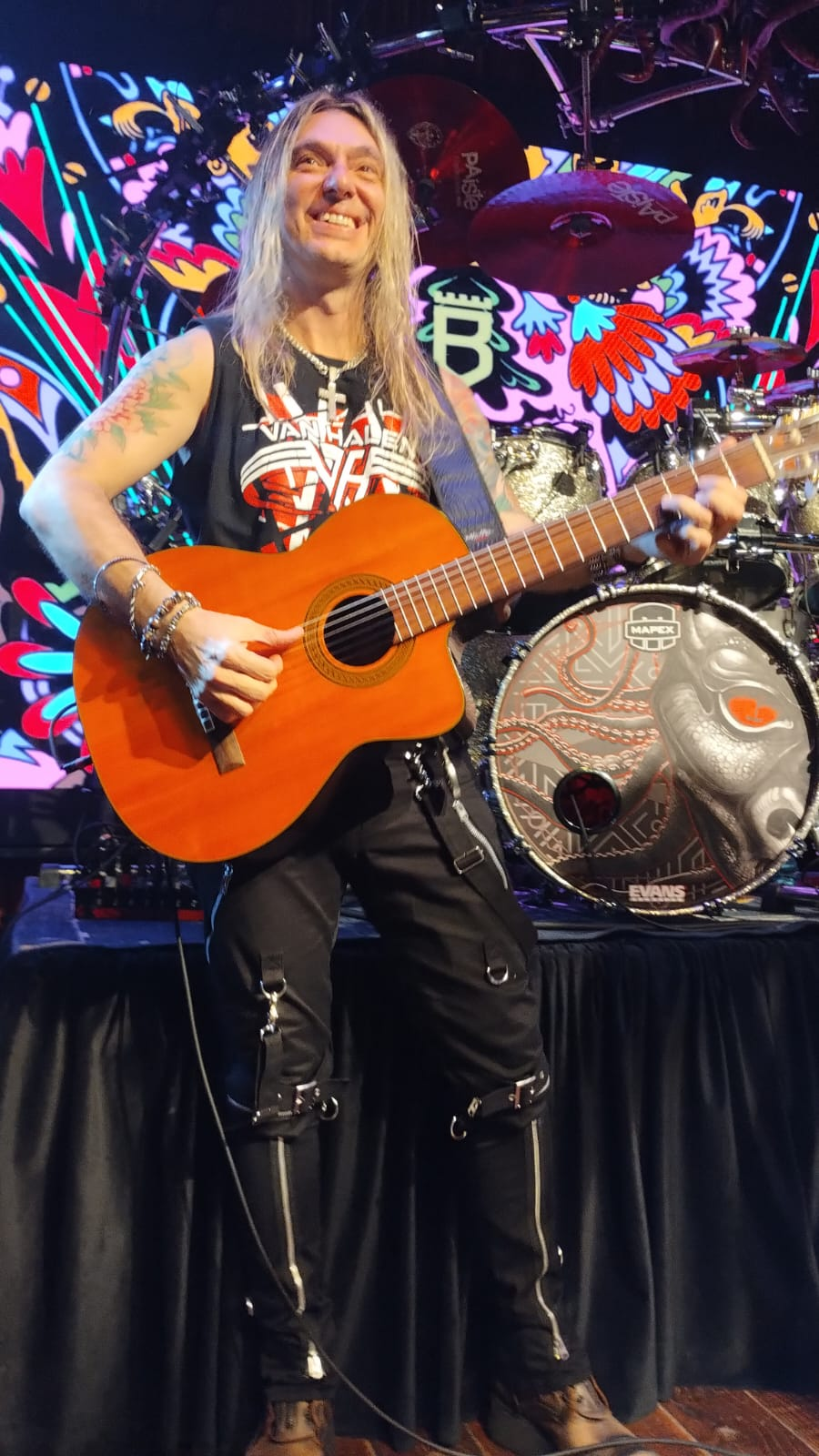
Falaschi performing in 2023

=== Mitrium ===
- Eyes of Time (1993)

=== Symbols ===
- Symbols (1998)
- Call to the End (2000)

=== Venus ===
- Ordinary Existence (1998)

=== Angra ===
- Rebirth (2001)
  - "Acid Rain" (2001) – single
  - "Hunters and Prey" (2002) – EP
  - "Rebirth World Tour – Live in São Paulo" (2001) – live album
- Temple of Shadows (2004)
  - "Wishing Well" (2004) – single
- Aurora Consurgens (2006)
- Aqua (2010)
  - "Arising Thunder" (2010) – single

=== Almah ===
- Almah (2006)
- Fragile Equality (2008)
- Motion (2011)
- Unfold (2013)
- E.V.O (2016)

=== Solo ===
- Moonlight (2016)
- Ballads (2017)
- The Glory of Sacred Truth (2018) – EP
- Temple of Shadows in Concert (2020)
- Vera Cruz (2021)
- Eldorado (2023)
- Vera Cruz - Live in São Paulo (2025)
- Mi'raj (2026)

=== Brazilian Portuguese versions of Japanese anime songs ===
- Pegasus Fantasy (Saint Seiya Sanctuary and Hades Chapter)
- Blue Forever (Saint Seiya Sanctuary and Hades Chapter)
- Never (Saint Seiya Heaven Chapter: Overture)
- Next Generation (Saint Seiya Omega) featuring Ricardo Cruz, Rodrigo Rossi, and Larissa Tassi

=== Guest appearances ===
- Genius Rock Opera Episode 2: In Search of the Little Prince (2002)
- Stilverlight (Russian band) Stilverlight (2014)
- Marius Danielsen The Legend of Valley Doom Part 1 (2015)
- Stardust Reverie Project Proclamation of Shadows (2015)
