= Massacration =

Parody heavy metal band

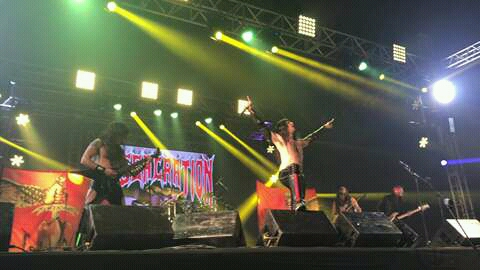
- The band performing in Fortaleza, 2017

Background information
- Origin: Fictional: United States; Actual: Brazil
- Genres: Heavy metal; thrash metal; speed metal; power metal; comedy metal; parody
- Years active: 2004–2012; 2016–present
- Labels: Fictional: Shusi Records; Actual: Deckdisc, EMI, Top Link Music, Shinigami Records
- Members: Detonator (Bruno Sutter); Red Head Hammett (Franco Fanti); Metal Avenger (Marco Antônio Alves); Headmaster (Adriano Silva); Jimmy the Hammer (Felipe Torres)
- Past members: Blondie Hammett (Fausto Fanti)
- Website: massacration.net

Massacration is a fictional American heavy metal band created by Brazilian humorists and musicians Bruno Sutter (as vocalist Detonator), Fausto Fanti (as lead guitarist Blondie Hammett) and Marco Antônio Alves (as bassist Metal Avenger), and actors Adriano Silva (as rhythm guitarist Headmaster) and Felipe Torres (as drummer Jimmy the Hammer), all of them part of the comedy troupe Hermes & Renato. Heavily influenced by the similar semi-fictional metal act Spinal Tap and self-styled as "a banda da galera" (roughly translated into English as "the people's/crowd's band"), Massacration is a light-hearted parody of heavy metal subculture and "metalhead/headbanger" stereotypes, lampooning the music and aesthetics of such famous metal bands as Black Sabbath, Iron Maiden, Judas Priest, Manowar, Sepultura, Angra, among others. The band's music features humorous lyrics written in a combination of intentionally broken English and Portuguese, sung in an exaggerated falsetto by Sutter.

Following Fanti's suicide in 2014 and a hiatus that lasted four years, the band eventually announced its comeback in 2016 with some lineup changes: Alves, formerly the bassist, took over the role of lead guitarist, and Fanti's brother, Franco, joined the group as the fictional bass player "Red Head Hammett".

Although Silva, Franco and Torres are credited as rhythm guitarist, bassist and drummer respectively and appear in the group's promotional materials, they are not musicians. For Silva, the rhythm guitar parts were initially handled by Fausto Fanti himself through overdubs, and later by Marco Antônio Alves; for Franco, the bass by session musician Marco Klein (under the moniker "El Muro"); and for Torres, the drums have been recorded by three session musicians: Fernando Lima (under the moniker "Straupelator"), Igor Cavalera (under the moniker "El Covero"), and Ricardo Confessori (under the moniker "El Perro Loco").

== History ==
=== Fictional history ===
MTV Brasil and Hermes & Renato produced a short, 10-minute mockumentary showcasing the band's fictional backstory in 2005 to promote the release of their then-upcoming debut Gates of Metal Fried Chicken of Death. Massacration's origins trace back to 1979 (in a nod to the same year when Spinal Tap was formed) in the United States, when petty criminal and talented guitarist John "Blondie" Hammett (played by Fausto Fanti), after being arrested for the sixth time, became cellmates with quail smuggler and castrato singer David "Detonator" Sutter (played by Bruno Sutter); united by their mutual tastes on rock and heavy metal music, they soon developed a very strong friendship. Having renounced crime following their release from prison, the duo got acquainted with up-and-coming tambourine player Donald Polai (played by Lecuk Ishida, a producer for MTV at the time who occasionally made one-time appearances for Hermes & Renato's sketches) and they decided to form a band, Death Mania; the trio performed their first gig at a bar south of Phoenix, Arizona, but Death Mania only lasted for a day as Polai soon after committed suicide, apparently influenced by the group's "ominous" name.

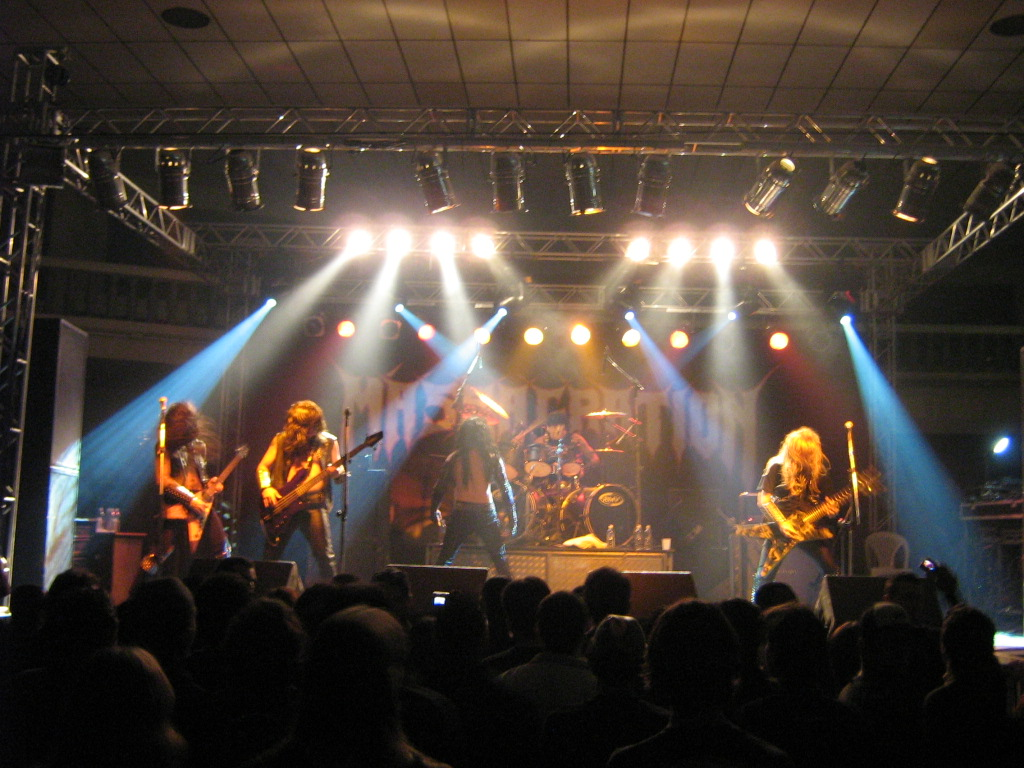
Massacration in Atibaia in 2007

Crestfallen over the death of their friend, Detonator and Hammett sunk into a deep depression; they eventually became regular customers of popular Italian restaurant Massas Crézio (or "Crézio's Pasta"), where they would constantly binge-eat to the point of growing morbidly obese. Touched by their situation, the restaurant's owner, Italian Brazilian immigrant Crézio, intervened and conceded them a rent-free room at his house where they could live and rehearse until recovering their spirits, and so they overcame their depression and lost all the extra weight they had gained. Motivated to start anew and form another group, they put an ad in a local newspaper looking for personnel; coincidentally, the spots were filled by Crézio's employees Jimmy "The Hammer" Lombardo (played by Felipe Torres), Klaus "Headmaster" Bissonette (played by Adriano Silva) and Rick "Metal Avenger" Banday (played by Marco Antônio Alves). As a homage to Crézio and his restaurant the band was initially christened Massascrézio, but as time went by the name was changed to Massacrézio, Massacrétion and, finally, Massacration.

Shortly after their very first show, Massacration was approached by world-renowned record producer Dick Dornelle (played by then-Hermes & Renato member Gil Brother), who had previously worked with bands and artists such as Queen, Iron Maiden and Michael Jackson. They then signed to his label Shusi Records and spent the following two months (due to the song's "high level of complexity") at a studio in North Carolina to record their first single, "Metal Massacre Attack (Aruê Aruô)", which was a critical and commercial hit, debuting at number one on Billboard Hot 100 – anachronistically in front of contemporary names like Usher, Maroon 5 and Gavin DeGraw – and awarding them a "Gremlin Award". However, success quickly went to Detonator's head and he began squandering the band's fortune on frivolities and inhalants (to which he became strongly addicted), what led to a deterioration of the relations between him and his colleagues. Following a racist joke made by a heavily intoxicated Detonator during a benefit concert in Somalia, the remaining members of Massacration expelled him from the band and returned to their former jobs at Crézio's restaurant, effectively ending the group's activities.

Many years later, Detonator, now a homeless beggar living in obscurity, ran into Hammett by chance; instantly recognizing themselves, they settled their differences and decided to reunite Massacration, recording the singles "Metal Bucetation" and "Metal Milkshake", the latter of which selling over 12 billion copies and awarding them both a "Sixfold Diamond" certification by the RIAA and the elusive "Nobel Prize in Music", which had only been previously given to Mozart, Beethoven and Frank Sinatra. Pleased by their massive success, the "God of Metal" decided to adopt Detonator as his legitimate son, and created for him and his bandmates the paradise of "Metal Land", where they continued to live since.

Amidst Massacration's 2012–16 hiatus, Bruno Sutter gave an interview to newspaper Folha de S.Paulo in-character as Detonator in 2014, explaining that, emboldened by the success of the TV series The Walking Dead, zombies invaded Metal Land and he was forced to escape (in an allusion to the plot of his then-recently released rock opera Metal Folclore: The Zoeira Never Ends...); he and his bandmates were separated, and Blondie Hammett was unfortunately killed during the zombies' raid. When they reunited safely, in 2016, Blondie was replaced by his long-lost brother Red Head Hammett so that they could continue performing.

=== Real history ===
Massacration (initially written as Massacrassion) was conceived in the early 2000s by the Brazilian comedy troupe Hermes & Renato, who at the time had their own sketch comedy television show broadcast by now-defunct MTV Brasil. Even though the band's first televised appearance dates from 2002, it would not be until 2004 when they released their first actual song, accompanied by a music video, "Metal Massacre Attack (Aruê Aruô)"; the success of the music video prompted them to produce more, for the songs "Metal Bucetation" and "Metal Milkshake", and soon after they began performing their first shows, accompanied by then-Sepultura drummer Igor Cavalera (under the pseudonym "El Covero") as a live musician.

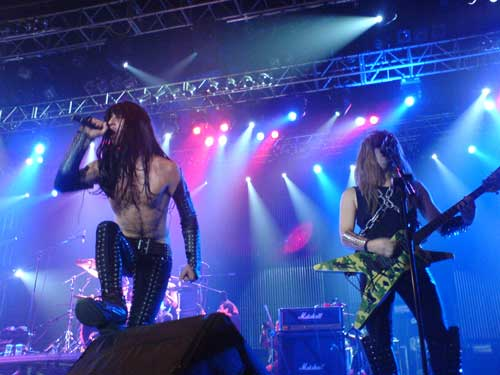
Bruno Sutter (as Detonator, left) and Fausto Fanti (as Blondie Hammett, right) during a performance

In July 2005 they announced their debut, Kings of Metal Fried Chicken of Death, whose title was subsequently changed to Gates of Metal Fried Chicken of Death; it was initially made available for streaming at MTV Brasil's official website on October 4 and released physically through Deckdisc six days later. The album counted with guest appearances by humorist Sérgio Mallandro and Ratos de Porão vocalist João Gordo (who also produced it under the pseudonym "Rick Rubinho", parodying Rick Rubin), and was critically acclaimed upon its release; according to 2006 data, it sold over 40,000 copies. Massacration's success then led them to appear in other MTV programs, such as the humorous football competition Rockgol and the animated series Megaliga MTV de VJs Paladinos; from 2005 to 2006 they also hosted their own music video program on the network, Total Massacration.

In 2007, now with session drummer Fernando Lima (under the pseudonym of Straupelator), the group began work on a follow-up album, Good Blood Headbanguers, but after a series of delays it was only released on October 10, 2009 through EMI; its cover art was officially unveiled to the public three days prior, alongside an outtake from Gates of Metal Fried Chicken of Death, "Anal Weapon War". Good Blood Headbanguers was produced by Roy Z, known for his work with other metal artists, and counted with a guest appearance by brega singer Falcão on the track "The Mummy"; however, it was not as unanimously well received as its predecessor.

In 2012, coinciding with Bruno Sutter's departure from Hermes & Renato (then called "Banana Mecânica"), he put Massacration on hold, explaining that "one shouldn't keep on repeating the same joke". At the time, fans speculated that Sutter's decision of leaving the troupe was influenced by his then-girlfriend (and future fiancée) Nyvi Estephan, who received the pejorative nickname of "Yoko Ono" amongst them. Expressing his desire to focus on a more "female-centric" project, he founded in 2013 a new band based around his "Detonator" character, Detonator e as Musas do Metal, of which he is the sole male member; their debut album, the rock opera Metal Folclore: The Zoeira Never Ends..., came out the following year.

On July 30, 2014, Fanti was found dead by suicide in his apartment.

After a four-year hiatus, on May 20, 2016, the band reunited for an award-winning McDonald's commercial promoting their Grand Big Mac hamburger, in which they performed a new song, "Grand Pedido" – a heavy metal cover of the chain's famous "two all-beef patties" jingle. The band went through many lineup changes since Fanti's death. Marco Antônio Alves, who was then the bassist of the band, became officially the lead guitarist (and also took over rhythm guitar duties during recording sessions); Fanti's brother Franco, who had replaced him in Hermes & Renato the year prior, became the band's fictional bassist under the stage name "Red Head Hammett"; Angra and Shaman drummer Ricardo Confessori, and bassist Marco Klein, also joined them as touring musicians under the respective pseudonyms of "El Perro Loco" and "El Muro". On December 20, 2016, Sutter confirmed that Massacration had officially returned to its activities, and that they intended to release more music futurely.

On June 1, 2017, the band released a new single, "Metal MILF", alongside a music video which counted with a guest appearance by model and DJ Sabrina Boing Boing. Later that year their first live album/DVD, Live Metal Espancation, came out amidst generally positive reception, being chosen by magazine Roadie Crew the best metal DVD of 2017. Also in 2017, in-character as Detonator, Bruno Sutter was a guest vocalist on the single "Metal for Demons" by Florianópolis-based one-man band Xakol; the song was described by frontman Saulo Castilho as a tribute to Massacration.

In November 2018, Massacration took part in a "mini-tour" through Southeast Brazil alongside Angra and Tuatha de Danann.

2019 saw the release of another single, "Motormetal", followed by "Metal Galera" in 2020. Later that year, drummer Ricardo Confessori quit the group to pursue a solo career, which resulted in the return of Fernando Lima, the original session drummer. To celebrate the Brazilian holiday of World Rock Day on July 13, 2023, the band released the single "Metal Is My Life", and later that year, on December 1, "Metal Warferas" came out, which had its music video shot at the Beto Carrero World amusement park.

On December 15, 2023, Sutter announced that Massacration began work on a third studio album, entitled Metal Is My Life, released on July 12, 2024; four days prior, on July 8, the single "Revenge of the Bull" came out as a teaser.

== Band members ==
=== Current members ===
Actual members

- Detonator (Bruno Sutter) – vocals (2004–2012, 2016–present)
- Metal Avenger (Marco Antônio Alves) – bass guitar (2004–2012), lead guitar, rhythm guitar (2016–present)

Fictional members

- Red Head Hammett (Franco Fanti) – bass guitar, backing vocals (2016–present)
- Headmaster (Adriano Silva) – rhythm guitar, backing vocals (2004–2012, 2016–present)
- Jimmy the Hammer (Felipe Torres) – drums (2004–2012, 2016–present)

=== Former members ===
- Blondie Hammett (Fausto Fanti) – lead guitar, rhythm guitar (2004–2012, died 2014)

=== Live/session musicians ===
- Straupelator (Fernando Lima) – drums (2004–2012, 2020–present)
- El Covero (Igor Cavalera) – drums (2004)
- El Perro Loco (Ricardo Confessori) – drums (2016–2020)
- El Muro (Marco Klein) – bass guitar, backing vocals (2016–present)

== Discography ==
Studio albums

- 2005 – Gates of Metal Fried Chicken of Death
- 2009 – Good Blood Headbanguers
- 2024 – Metal Is My Life

Live/video album

- 2017 – Live Metal Espancation

Singles/music videos

Year	Song	Album
2004	"Metal Massacre Attack (Aruê Aruô)"	Gates of Metal Fried Chicken of Death
2004	"Metal Bucetation"	Gates of Metal Fried Chicken of Death
2004	"Metal Milkshake"	Gates of Metal Fried Chicken of Death
2005	"Metal Is the Law"	Gates of Metal Fried Chicken of Death
2005	"Cereal Metal"	Gates of Metal Fried Chicken of Death
2006	"Evil Papagali"	Gates of Metal Fried Chicken of Death
2009	"Hammercage Hotdog Hell"	Good Blood Headbanguers
2009	"Sufocators (Note: sic) of Metal"	Good Blood Headbanguers
2009	"The Bull"	Good Blood Headbanguers
2009	"The Mummy" (feat. Falcão)	Good Blood Headbanguers
2009	"Anal Weapon War" (Note: Eventually re-recorded for 2024's Metal Is My Life)	Non-album singles
2016	"Grand Pedido"	Non-album singles
2017	"Metal MILF"	Non-album singles
2019	"Motormetal"	Non-album singles
2020	"Metal Galera"	Non-album singles
2023	"Metal Is My Life"	Metal Is My Life
2023	"Metal Warferas"	Metal Is My Life
2024	"Revenge of the Bull"	Metal Is My Life
2025	"Macetation Apocalypse"	Metal Is My Life
2025	"Flight of the Chicken"	Metal Is My Life

== See also ==
- Hermes & Renato
- Spinal Tap
- Bad News
- Tenacious D
- Nanowar of Steel
- Catarrhal Noise
- Dethklok
