= Gates of Metal Fried Chicken of Death =

Studio album by Massacration
- Released: October 4, 2005 (MTV.com.br); October 10, 2005 (CD)
- Recorded: 2004–05
- Studio: Estúdio Bebop
- Genres: Comedy metal; heavy metal; thrash metal
- Length: 46:23
- Label: Deckdisc
- Producer: João Gordo

Massacration chronology
Gates of Metal Fried Chicken of Death (2005)	Good Blood Headbanguers (2009)

Professional ratings
Review scores
Source	Rating
Whiplash.net	link

Gates of Metal Fried Chicken of Death is the debut studio album by Massacration, a fictional heavy metal band originally conceived for sketches by the Brazilian comedy troupe Hermes & Renato. Announced in July 2005 under the working title "Kings of Metal Fried Chicken of Death" (in a possible allusion to Manowar's 1988 album Kings of Metal), it was initially made available for streaming on MTV Brasil's official website on October 4 and released physically through Deckdisc six days later. The album counts with guest appearances by Sérgio Mallandro (on the track "Metal Glu-Glu") and Ratos de Porão vocalist João Gordo (on the "Intro", in which he is heard reading a cake recipe with a booming, guttural voice), who also produced it under the pseudonym "Rick Rubinho" (parodying Rick Rubin).

"The God Master", a tribute to humorist Costinha (who was a huge influence for Hermes & Renato's comedy style), contains samples of his 1981 comedy album O Peru da Festa. Likewise, "Away Doom" is composed mostly of loops of shouts by then-Hermes & Renato member Gil Brother. "Metal Bucetation" was retroactively described by vocalist Bruno Sutter as a "shameless rip-off" of Helloween's "The Dark Ride". The cover art was drawn by cartoonist and illustrator Mozart Couto, and is somewhat reminiscent of Manowar's 1996 album Louder Than Hell.

Gates of Metal Fried Chicken of Death was critically acclaimed upon its release, with its humorous and inventive songwriting and guest appearances being praised, and according to 2006 data it sold over 40,000 copies. Music videos were made for "Cereal Metal", "Evil Papagali" and "Metal Is the Law", the latter receiving a nomination for an MTV Video Music Brazil Award in 2006, in the "Video of the Year" category; "Metal Massacre Attack (Aruê Aruô)", "Metal Bucetation" and "Metal Milkshake" had been released in advance in 2004.

In a 2021 interview for music news website Wikimetal, Bruno Sutter spoke very fondly of his work on Gates of Metal Fried Chicken of Death, describing it as "one of the best Brazilian heavy metal albums of all time".

== Track listing ==
All lyrics are written by Detonator and Blondie Hammett; all music is composed by Massacration.

No.	Title	Length
1.	"Intro" (feat. João Gordo)	1:25
2.	"Metal Is the Law"	3:45
3.	"Evil Papagali (Note: From "papagaio" (Portuguese for "parrot"))"	4:51
4.	"Metal Massacre Attack (Aruê Aruô)"	1:54
5.	"Feel the Fire... from Barbecue"	3:49
6.	"Metal Milkshake"	2:47
7.	"The God Master"	2:17
8.	"Cereal Metal"	4:00
9.	"Metal Dental Destruction"	5:20
10.	"Let's Ride to Metal Land (The Passage Is R$1.00)"	4:46
11.	"Metal Glu-Glu" (feat. Sérgio Mallandro)	3:15
12.	"Away Doom" (feat. Gil Brother)	1:53
13.	"Metal Bucetation (Note: From "buceta", also spelled "boceta" (Portuguese for "pussy"))^{[I]}"	6:22
Total length:		46:23

I "Metal Bucetation" contains a techno remix of "Metal Massacre Attack (Aruê Aruô)" as a hidden track at 4:04, after 30 seconds of silence.

== Personnel ==
Massacration

- Detonator (Bruno Sutter) – vocals
- Blondie Hammett (Fausto Fanti) – lead guitar, additional vocals
- Metal Avenger (Marco Antônio Alves) – bass guitar, additional vocals

Additional musicians

- João Gordo – vocals (track 1)
- Sérgio Mallandro – co-lead vocals (track 11)
- Gil Brother – vocals (track 12)
- Straupelator (Fernando Lima) – drums

Production

- Rick Rubinho (João Gordo) – production
- Mozart Couto – cover art
- João Augusto – art direction
- Sérgio Soffiatti – recording, mixing
- Carlos Freitas – mastering
- Ricardo Zupa, Felipe Aguillar – photography
