= Metal Folclore: The Zoeira Never Ends... =

Studio album by Detonator e as Musas do Metal
- Released: July 19, 2014
- Recorded: 2013
- Genres: Comedy metal; heavy metal; power metal; folk metal
- Length: 46:10
- Label: Self-released
- Producer: Bruno Sutter

Detonator e as Musas do Metal chronology
Metal Folclore: The Zoeira Never Ends... (2014)	DetonaThor (2015)

Metal Folclore: The Zoeira (Note: "Zoeira" is a Brazilian slang term loosely translated to English as "joking [around]" or "mockery") Never Ends... (also simply referred to as Metal Folclore) is the debut album by Detonator e as Musas do Metal, a parodic heavy metal project idealized by Brazilian singer Bruno Sutter under his persona of "Detonator", which he originally conceived for his previous band Massacration (itself developed from sketches by his former comedy troupe Hermes & Renato). Self-released on July 19, 2014, it is fully sung in Portuguese, unlike Sutter's previous outputs with Massacration, and is also his first concept album/rock opera. Its insert comes with a sticker album and accompanying stickers.

Work on the album began in 2013; it counts with guest appearances by Alexandre Frota (as the narrator), Rafael Bittencourt, Felipe Andreoli, Ricardo Confessori (all of them known for their work with Angra), João Gordo and voice actor Gilberto Baroli (who voiced Gemini Saga in the Brazilian dub of the anime Saint Seiya, reprising his role). A music video for "Saci" premiered in advance on October 31, 2013, coinciding with the Brazilian holiday of Dia do Saci.

Metal Folclore was critically acclaimed, being praised for its humorous plot and array of guest appearances; in the subsequent years following its release, Detonator e as Musas do Metal was chosen by readers of website Whiplash.net the second best band of 2015. In a brief period of two months since its release date, the album sold over 1,700 copies.

== Plot ==
Detonator is forced to flee from his home at "Metal Land" after it is entirely ravaged by zombies, subsequently shipwrecking in the shores of Brazil, where he is rescued by two fishermen. He then decides to turn Brazil into a second Metal Land, and summons creatures of Brazilian folklore (and Saquito, a testicle-shaped mascot used by a Minas Gerais-based cancer association who acquired infamy after becoming an Internet meme in 2013) to his aid. Despite accomplishing his mission, he eventually stumbles across Gemini Saga, angering him; in retaliation, Saga beats him up relentlessly. Furious, Detonator promises to get his revenge on the "next album".

== Track listing ==
All tracks are written by Detonator.

No.	Title	English title	Length
1.	"Introdução"	Introduction	0:16
2.	"Metaleiro"	Metalhead	5:09
3.	"Uma Grande Tragédia"	A Great Tragedy	0:16
4.	"Metal Zumbi"	Zombie Metal	5:26
5.	"Tadinho Dele"	Poor Him	0:26
6.	"Curupira"		4:28
7.	"Boto"		4:49
8.	"Boitatá"		3:27
9.	"Mula sem Cabeça"	Headless Mule	5:22
10.	"Cuca"		3:14
11.	"Saci" (feat. João Gordo)		3:56
12.	"O Pimpolho do Folclore"	The Folklore's Newbie	0:28
13.	"Saquito"		3:31
14.	"Missão Cumprida"	Mission Accomplished	0:27
15.	"Qual É o Negócio?"	What Is the Thing?	3:27
16.	"Mestre do Santuário"	Pope (Note: In a more literal translation of Portuguese, "Master of the Sanctuary")	1:28

== Personnel ==
Detonator e as Musas do Metal

- Detonator – vocals
- Juliana Farias – bass guitar
- Iza Molinari – drums
- Isa Nielsen – electric guitar
- Paula "Paulitchas" Carregosa – electric guitar

Guest musicians

- Alexandre Frota – narration (tracks 1, 3, 5, 12 and 14), co-lead vocals (track 15)
- João Gordo – co-lead vocals (track 11)
- Felipe Andreoli – bass guitar
- Rafael Bittencourt – electric guitar
- Ricardo Confessori – drums
- Gilberto Baroli – narration (track 16)

Production

- Bruno Sutter – production
- Rafael Louzada – cover art
