= Bruno Sutter (singer) =

Brazilian actor and musician (born 1979)

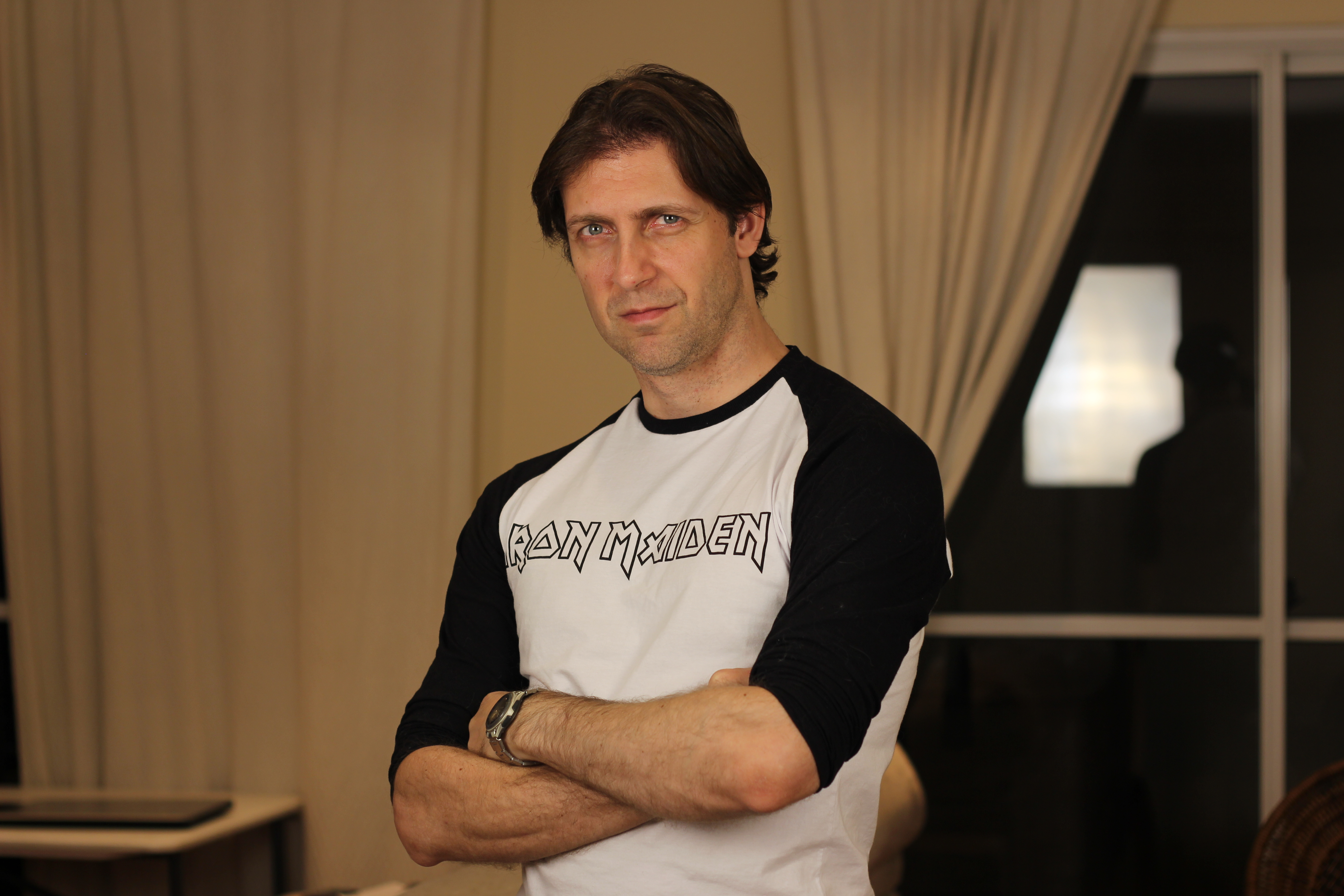
- Sutter in 2018
- Born: Bruno Alexandre Sutter de Lima; June 13, 1979 (age 47); Petrópolis, Rio de Janeiro, Brazil
- Other name: Detonator
- Occupations: Actor; singer-songwriter; record producer; humorist; YouTuber; television music and talent competition judge
- Years active: 1999–present
- Known for: Hermes & Renato, Massacration, Detonator e as Musas do Metal, The Soundtrackers
- Spouse: Adriane Cristina Sutter (divorced)
- Partners: Nyvi Estephan (2014–2019); Talita Dias (2020–present)
- Website: detonator.com.br

Bruno Alexandre Sutter de Lima (born June 13, 1979) is a Brazilian actor, musician, singer-songwriter, record producer, humorist, YouTuber, voice actor, and television music and talent competition judge. He is famous for his work with comedy troupe Hermes & Renato, of which he was one of the founding members, remaining with them from its inception in 1999 until his departure in 2012; under the alias Detonator, he fronts the parodic heavy metal projects Massacration and Detonator and as Musas do Metal.

Throughout May 2022, Sutter also was the world champion of the video game Enduro, with a high score of 4,637.8.

== Biography ==
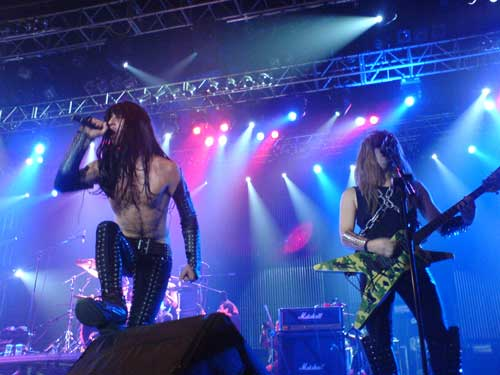
Sutter (left) and Fausto Fanti (right) performing as Detonator and Blondie Hammett respectively at a Massacration concert

Sutter was born in Petrópolis on June 13, 1979, and began his career as an entertainer at churrascarias singing covers of famous songs. In 1999 he founded Hermes & Renato alongside his friends Marco Antônio Alves, Fausto Fanti, Adriano Silva and Felipe Torres; known for their off-color humor, frequently reliant on pop culture references, they amassed a strong cult following throughout the late 1990s/early to mid-2000s during their tenure on MTV Brasil. Sutter was famous for playing, among others, Detonator, the lead singer of comedy band Massacration, which would eventually spawn off to release their own albums and singles. When Hermes & Renato parted ways with MTV to join Record in 2010, changing their name to "Banana Mecânica", Sutter stayed with the group until 2012, when he left to re-join MTV on his own; there he would host the rock-oriented variety show Rocka Rolla and the satirical newscast Furo MTV. When MTV Brasil went defunct in 2013, he founded alongside Marcelo Adnet and Tatá Werneck the YouTube channel Amada Foca, and got his own radio talk show, Bem que se Kiss, in 2014, broadcast by Kiss FM.

Coinciding with his departure from Hermes & Renato, Sutter put Massacration on hold to form another musical project based around his "Detonator" persona, Detonator e as Musas do Metal; their debut album, the rock opera Metal Folclore: The Zoeira Never Ends..., came out in 2014 and counts with guest appearances by Alexandre Frota as the narrator, musicians João Gordo, Rafael Bittencourt, Felipe Andreoli and Ricardo Confessori, and voice actor Gilberto Baroli. In 2013 he published through Edições Ideal the book A Bíblia do Heavy Metal – O Antigo Testamento, co-authored alongside Rafael Rosa. In 2015 he released the extended play DetonaThor to promote the MOBA video game Smite, for which he voiced Thor in its Brazilian Portuguese dub. In 2017 he provided narration for another MOBA video game, Heavy Metal Machines. On December 18, 2020, his second full-length release with Detonator e as Musas do Metal, the Christmas album Metal Metalino, came out unannounced, featuring parodies of Christmas carols with a heavy metal twist. The band's third studio album, Arraiá do Metal, was released on June 7, 2021, this time featuring parodies of traditional Festa Junina songs.

He also served as vocalist of cover band The Soundtrackers, and released solo albums under his true name of Bruno Sutter, the first of which having its production crowdfunded via a successful Kickante campaign; it reached R$42,005.00, surpassing its originally intended goal of R$40,000.00. In 2016 he returned to perform with Massacration, while no longer being an official member of Hermes & Renato.

In 2017, as his character of Detonator, he was a guest vocalist on the single "Metal for Demons" by Florianópolis-based one-man band Xakol; the song was described by frontman Saulo Castilho as a tribute to Massacration.

In 2018 he was chosen by voice actor Wendel Bezerra to perform the official Brazilian Portuguese version of Dragon Ball Super's third ending song, "Usubeni", originally by Lacco Tower, as well as the Brazilian version of Akira Kushida's "Kyūkyoku no Battle", from the same anime. Also from 2018 to 2019 he was a judge for Record's singing competition Canta Comigo, returning to its preteen-oriented spin-off Canta Comigo Teen, which premiered in 2020.

On June 28, 2022, Sutter was announced as a contestant of the second season of Record's reality show Ilha Record. The same year, he became top player of the Atari 2600 game Enduro, obtaining a high score of 4,637.8 points, surpassing the 4,387.6 points of previous champion Christian Lee Keilback; Sutter's record would later be broken by Ulisses Patriota, with a score of 6,177.5.

On January 16, 2023, he posted on Twitter that he was chosen as the voice of Vidaldus Taka in the Brazilian dubbing of the anime Fairy Tail.

== Personal life ==
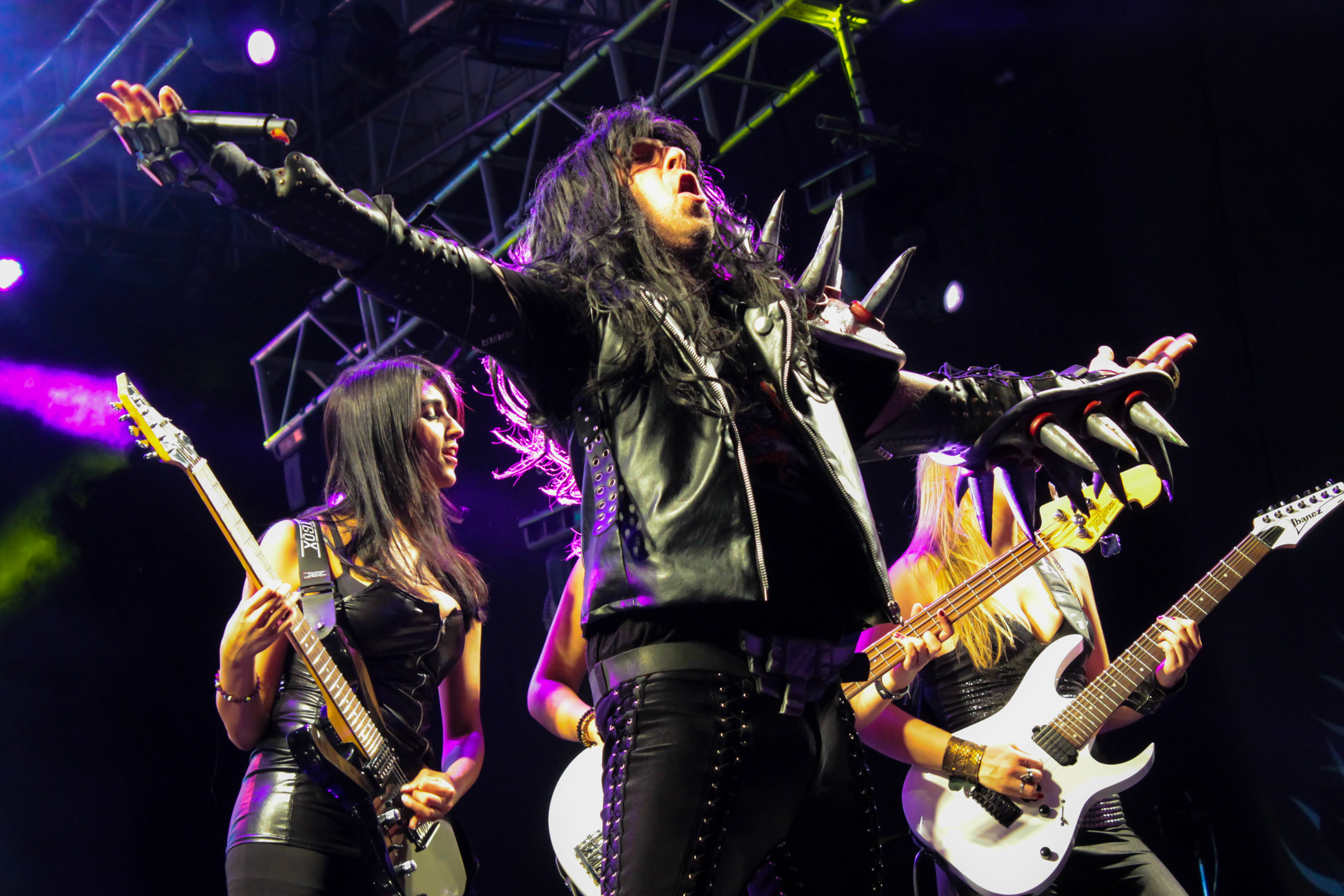
From left to right: Paulitchas Carregosa, Sutter and Isa Nielsen performing at a Detonator e as Musas do Metal concert in 2015

At some point in the early 2000s Sutter was married to veterinarian Adriane Cristina Sutter.

From 2014 to 2019 he was engaged to actress, television presenter and digital influencer Nyvi Estephan, twelve years his younger; they met in the mid-2000s, while shooting Hermes & Renato sketches for MTV Brasil, and Estephan has made countless cameos throughout the show's original 1999–2010 run. Minor controversy arose when Estephan began dating YouTuber Felipe Castanhari soon after their engagement was terminated, making their relationship official on June 12, 2020. In an interview for podcast Inteligência Ltda. in 2021, Sutter stated that his breakup with Estephan was one of the "worst moments of [his] career".

In August 2020 he began a relationship with model, singer and fellow Canta Comigo judge Talita Dias.

In 2023, Sutter revealed he was undergoing treatment for a mild case of vocal cord paresis.

== Discography ==
Massacration

- 2005 – Gates of Metal Fried Chicken of Death
- 2009 – Good Blood Headbanguers
- 2017 – Live Metal Espancation (live album)
- 2024 – Metal Is My Life

Detonator e as Musas do Metal

- 2014 – Metal Folclore: The Zoeira Never Ends...
- 2015 – DetonaThor (EP)
- 2015 – Live InSana (live album)
- 2020 – Metal Metalino
- 2021 – Arraiá do Metal

Solo

- 2015 – Bruno Sutter
- 2017 – Alive in Hell (live album)

== Bibliography ==
- A Bíblia do Heavy Metal – O Antigo Testamento (Edições Ideal, 2013; co-written by Rafael Rosa)
