= Metal Is My Life =

Studio album by Massacration
- Released: July 12, 2024
- Recorded: 2023–24
- Studio: Sound Lab Studios
- Genres: Comedy metal; heavy metal; speed metal
- Length: 44:04
- Label: Top Link Music
- Producer: Alexandre Russo

Massacration chronology
Live Metal Espancation (2017)	Metal Is My Life (2024)

Metal Is My Life is the third studio album by fictional heavy metal band Massacration. Released on July 12, 2024, through Top Link Music, it is the band's first album of new material in 15 years following 2009's Good Blood Headbanguers.

In the aftermath of a four-year hiatus which lasted from 2012 to 2016, Massacration returned to active releasing the live album Live Metal Espancation and the singles "Metal MILF", "Motormetal" and "Metal Galera" between 2017 and 2020; in an interview for news portal Omelete promoting the music video for "Metal Galera", its director Felipe Torres, who also plays the band's fictional drummer "Jimmy the Hammer", claimed that he didn't rule out the possibility of Massacration releasing a new studio album in the future. However, it wouldn't be until late 2023, following the release of two more singles (the eponymous "Metal Is My Life" and "Metal Warferas"), when vocalist Bruno Sutter officially stated that a new album was on the works. On June 18, 2024, the album's name was confirmed to be Metal Is My Life, and on July 8, the teaser single "Revenge of the Bull" was released. On July 10, the album's cover art and track listing were unveiled. On February 10, 2025, commemorating the approaching Brazilian Carnival season, the band produced a music video for "Macetation Apocalypse", shot in Salvador, Bahia; yet another music video, for "Flight of the Chicken", came out later that year on September 5.

Originally slated to come out on July 13, 2024 (coinciding with the Brazilian holiday of World Rock Day and the one-year anniversary of the eponymous single), the release date was at last minute moved to one day earlier, on July 12, due to what Sutter described as his "anxiety".

== Critical reception ==
The album has been mostly positively received since its release. Webzine Rock'n'Louder praised it as "Massacration's love letter to heavy metal", noting the quality of the re-recorded versions of "Metal MILF", "Motormetal" and "Metal Galera". Writing for Confere Rock, Flávio Farias gave it a mixed review, stating that "even though [the band's] sonority lacks polish, one can see [they] have good ideas"; he gave particular praise to the track "Revenge of the Bull", highlighting its "serious message" in regards to "animal abuse suffered by bulls in bullfighting", but criticized "November Gay" and "Metal MILF" as being "jokes of bad taste" with "transphobic and ageist undertones respectively", ultimately rating the album with a 6 out of 10. In a brief period of five days since its release date, Metal Is My Life reached over 100,000 streamings on Spotify.

On February 4, 2025, Metal Is My Life was chosen by readers of the magazine Roadie Crew as the best Brazilian album of 2024, while Sutter himself (credited as Detonator) was elected the best Brazilian vocalist.

== Track listing ==
"Metal MILF", "Motormetal", "Metal Galera" and "Anal Weapon War", the latter originally an outtake from the band's 2005 debut Gates of Metal Fried Chicken of Death, were all re-recorded from their original releases. "November Gay" is a thinly veiled parody of Guns N' Roses' song "November Rain".

All lyrics are written by Detonator, except for "Anal Weapon War" by Detonator and Blondie Hammett; all music is composed by Massacration.

No.	Title	Length
1.	"Macetation Apocalypse"	3:44
2.	"Revenge of the Bull"	3:40
3.	"November Gay"	4:51
4.	"Metal MILF"	3:57
5.	"Flight of the Chicken"	4:29
6.	"Metal Galera"	4:26
7.	"Metal Is My Life"	3:50
8.	"Metal Warferas"	3:20
9.	"March of Headbenze"	3:40
10.	"Motormetal"	3:10
11.	"Anal Weapon War"	4:17
Total length:		44:04

== Personnel ==
Massacration

- Detonator (Bruno Sutter) – vocals
- Metal Avenger (Marco Antônio Alves) – lead guitar
- Red Head Hammett (Franco Fanti) – rhythm guitar

Guest musicians

- Straupelator (Fernando Lima) – drums
- El Muro (Marco Klein) – bass guitar

Production

- Alexandre Russo – production
- Leandro Dexter – cover art
