= Good Blood Headbanguers =

Studio album by Massacration
- Released: October 10, 2009
- Recorded: 2007
- Genre: Comedy metal; heavy metal; glam metal; speed metal
- Length: 48:12
- Label: EMI
- Producer: Roy Z

Massacration chronology
Gates of Metal Fried Chicken of Death (2005)	Good Blood Headbanguers (2009)	Live Metal Espancation (2017)

Professional ratings
Review scores
Source	Rating
Whiplash.net	link
G1	Mixed link

Good Blood Headbanguers ^{[sic]} (Note: "Good blood" is a literal translation to English of the Brazilian colloquial expression "sangue bom" (meaning a trustworthy person), while the intentional misspelling of "headbangers" is a reference to the fact that the digraph ge is written as gue in Portuguese) is the second studio album by fictional heavy metal band Massacration. Originally slated for a 2007 release, after a series of delays due to label issues it eventually came out on October 10, 2009 through EMI; its cover art was officially unveiled to the public three days prior alongside an outtake of their previous album Gates of Metal Fried Chicken of Death, "Anal Weapon War".

Produced by Roy Z, famous for his work with other bands and artists such as Bruce Dickinson, Judas Priest, Helloween, Halford and Sebastian Bach, it sees the group heading towards a faster, more aggressive sonority influenced by thrash metal, but also experimenting with glam metal elements as seen in the power ballad "The Bull". Famous brega singer Falcão makes a guest appearance on the track "The Mummy", the album's leading single and for which a music video was made; former pornographic actors Fabiane Thompson and Kid Bengala appear in the music video for "The Bull". Two more music videos were made for "Hammercage Hotdog Hell" and "Sufocators of Metal".

Owing to their 2012–16 hiatus, Good Blood Headbanguers would ultimately be Massacration's final release with guitarist Fausto Fanti ("Blondie Hammett"), who committed suicide on July 30, 2014. A follow-up, Metal Is My Life, came out in 2024.

== Critical reception ==
Good Blood Headbanguers received mostly positive reviews upon its release. Writing for Whiplash.net, Thiago El Cid Cardim rated it with 8 stars out of 10, noticing the fact that "[the album's] sonority is way heavier and faster than its predecessor's, probably due to Roy Z's production", and that "the band adopted a visibly glam-/hard rock-inspired aesthetics, more Poison and less Judas Priest". He particularly praised the tracks "The Mummy" and "The Bull". A more mixed review came from G1's Amauri Stamboroski Jr., who comparing it to its predecessor called it "an uneven work mixing good moments with less funny tracks".

In a 2022 interview for Whiplash.net, vocalist Bruno Sutter has stated that he himself does not think very highly of Good Blood Headbanguers, claiming that even though the album "has its moments", its production was "kinda rushed" and most of the songs of its second half were "filler", written to finish the album more quickly owing to pressure from EMI.

== Track listing ==
All lyrics are written by Detonator and Blondie Hammett; all music is composed by Massacration.

No.	Title	Length
1.	"Hammercage Hotdog Hell"	2:48
2.	"The Mummy" (feat. Falcão)	5:30
3.	"Sufocators (Note: Intentional misspelling of "Suffocators") of Metal"	3:40
4.	"The Bull"	5:42
5.	"The Fire, the Steel, the Heavy and the Money"	5:05
6.	"The Big Heavy Metal"	5:10
7.	"Bad Defecation (The Bost (Note: From "bosta" (Portuguese for "shit")) Thunder)"	5:03
8.	"Good Blood Headbanguers"	3:43
9.	"Massacration"	5:16
10.	"The Hymn of Metal Land"	4:05
Total length:		48:12

== Personnel ==
Massacration

- Detonator (Bruno Sutter) – lead vocals
- Blondie Hammett (Fausto Fanti) – lead guitar, backing vocals, co-lead vocals (track 4)
- Metal Avenger (Marco Antônio Alves) – bass guitar, backing vocals

Additional musicians

- Falcão – co-lead vocals (track 2)
- Straupelator (Fernando Lima) – drums

Production

- Roy Z – production
- Renato Tribuzy – art direction
