= Live Metal Espancation =

Live album by Massacration
- Released: December 15, 2017 (CD); December 22, 2017 (DVD)
- Recorded: August 26, 2017
- Venue: Tropical Butantã, São Paulo
- Genre: Comedy metal; heavy metal; thrash metal
- Length: 1:03:00
- Label: Top Link Music (CD); Shinigami Records (DVD)
- Producer: Alexandre Russo

Massacration chronology
| Good Blood Headbanguers (2009) | Live Metal Espancation (2017) | Metal Is My Life (2024) |

Live Metal Espancation (Note: From "espancamento" (Portuguese for "spanking")) is a live album by fictional heavy metal band Massacration. Their first release under the Massacration name since the 2009 studio album Good Blood Headbanguers, it was recorded during a gig at entertainment space Tropical Butantã in São Paulo on August 26, 2017 and released through Top Link Music on December 15 in CD format and for streaming, and in DVD through Shinigami Records a week later, on December 22. Produced by Alexandre Russo, who previously worked with Angra, the show counted with guest appearances by former pornographic actors Fabiane Thompson and Kid Bengala, and Hermes & Renato characters Boça and Joselito Sem-Noção (played by Felipe Torres and Adriano Silva respectively). Under the pseudonym "El Perro Loco", Ricardo Confessori of Angra and Shaman served as a guest drummer. The cover art was provided by critically acclaimed graphic designer João Duarte.

The album was positively reviewed upon its release, with their "return to shape" after a four-year hiatus and sense of humor being praised, and was chosen by magazine Roadie Crew the best metal DVD of 2017.

== Track listing ==
| No. | Title | Length |
|---|---|---|
| 1. | "Intro Show Massacration" | 4:58 |
| 2. | "Metal Is the Law" | 4:05 |
| 3. | "Metal Milkshake" | 3:09 |
| 4. | "The Mummy" | 5:09 |
| 5. | "Cereal Metal" | 4:13 |
| 6. | "Metal Dental Destruction" | 5:26 |
| 7. | "The Bull" | 5:55 |
| 8. | "Metal Glu-Glu" | 2:45 |
| 9. | "Let's Ride to Metal Land (The Passage Is R$1.00)" | 4:47 |
| 10. | "Evil Papagali" | 5:04 |
| 11. | "Massacration" | 5:19 |
| 12. | "Metal MILF" | 4:57 |
| 13. | "Metal Massacre Attack (Aruê Aruô)" | 2:34 |
| 14. | "Metal Bucetation" | 4:39 |
| Total length: | | 1:03:00 |

== Personnel ==
Massacration

- Detonator (Bruno Sutter) – vocals
- Metal Avenger (Marco Antônio Alves) – lead guitar
- Red Head Hammett (Franco Fanti) – rhythm guitar, additional vocals

Guest musicians

- El Perro Loco (Ricardo Confessori) – drums
- El Muro (Marco Klein) – bass guitar

Production

- Alexandre Russo – production
- João Duarte – cover art
- Yasmin Cruz, Julio Szoke – photography
