= Costinha (disambiguation) =

Costinha is a Portuguese nickname. It may refer to:

- Costinha (humorist) (1923–1995), born Lírio Mário da Costa, Brazilian actor and showman
- Paulo Costinha (born 1973), Portuguese former football goalkeeper
- Costinha (born 1974), born Francisco José Rodrigues da Costa Júnior, Portuguese former football midfielder and manager
- Costinha (footballer, born 1992), born João José Pereira da Costa, Portuguese football midfielder
- Costinha (footballer, born 1994), born Pedro Miguel Neves da Costa, Portuguese football centre-back
- Costinha (footballer, born 2000), born João Pedro Loureiro da Costa, Portuguese football right-back
