= The Adventures of Sergio Mallandro =

1985 film directed by Erasto Filho

As Aventuras de Sérgio Mallandro
- Directed by: Erasto Filho
- Written by: Erasto Filho
- Starring: Sérgio Mallandro; Pedro de Lara; Palhaço Rolinha; Alexandre Frota; Paulo Cintura; Mara Maravilha; Cosme dos Santos; Fernando Reski; Sylvinho; Carla Prestes
- Release date: 1985
- Running time: 82 min.
- Country: Brazil
- Language: Portuguese

As aventuras de Sérgio Mallandro (The Adventures of Sergio Mallandro) is a Brazilian movie directed by Erasto Filho, released in 1985.

== Sinopse ==
The extraterrestrial dwarf Superpoderoso (super powerful) comes to Earth to find a human to enfranchise him with the power of "doing good". Mallandro is the chosen one, but he will need to prove himself worthy by accomplishing a mission: to find a little monkey lost by a girl called Tininha. If Mallandro fail, the power of "doing good" will be given to the movie's super villain, Dom Pedro de Lara y Lara, played by Pedro de Lara.

== Cast ==
- Sérgio Mallandro
- Pedro de Lara .... Dom Pedro
- Palhaço Rolinha .... Superpoderoso
- Cosme dos Santos .... Zé Cocada
- Alexandre Frota
- Carla Prestes .... Tininha
- Mara Maravilha
- Fernando Reski
- Paulo Cintura
- Sylvinho
