= Bruno Sutter (album) =

Studio album by Bruno Sutter
- Released: December 10, 2015
- Recorded: 2015
- Genres: Heavy metal; power metal; groove metal
- Length: 1:03:58
- Label: Self-released
- Producers: Bruno Sutter, Renato Tribuzy, Wagner Bernardes

Bruno Sutter chronology
Bruno Sutter (2015)	Alive in Hell (2017)

Singles from Bruno Sutter
- 1. "The Best Singer in the World" Released: 2015; 2. "GrAttitude" Released: 2015; 3. "Provoke Yourself" Released: 2015; 4. "I Bloody Love to Love You" Released: 2016

Bruno Sutter is the debut solo album by Brazilian singer Bruno Sutter. Self-released on December 10, 2015, it is Sutter's first output not to be centered around his character of "Detonator", employed by him in his other musical projects Massacration and Detonator e as Musas do Metal. Its production was crowdfunded via a successful Kickante campaign; it reached R$42,005.00, surpassing its originally intended goal of R$40,000.00.

Self-described as his "first 'serious' album", Sutter explained that "[it] doesn't have a definite genre" and was mostly influenced musically by "Cannibal Corpse, Iron Maiden, Roupa Nova and Death". Unlike his previous releases, which focus around parodical and humorous songs, Bruno Sutter features more serious, introspective and motivational songs, and also covers by musicians such as late 16th-/early 17th-century English composer John Dowland and sertanejo duo Chitãozinho & Xororó. "Socorro" takes its lyrics from a poem written by Sutter's late father, Aloysio Grazzinoli. The singles "The Best Singer in the World", "GrAttitude" and "Provoke Yourself" were released in advance earlier in 2015, while "I Bloody Love to Love You" came out as a single the year later.

Angra drummer Bruno Valverde served as a guest musician on the album. Its cover art was provided by Eduardo Francisco, an illustrator for the MOBA video game Smite who also drew the artwork for Sutter's previous EP DetonaThor.

Bruno Sutter was critically acclaimed upon its release, and was chosen by readers of website Whiplash.net the second best Brazilian album of 2015. Its cover art was also chosen the second best of the year, and Sutter himself was elected the best Brazilian male vocalist.

== Track listing ==
All tracks are written by Bruno Sutter, except for "My Boss Is a Corpse", "Stalker" and "Hipócrita" by Sutter and Paulo Guismes; "Socorro" by Aloysio Grazzinoli; "What If I Never Speed?" by John Dowland; and "Galopeira" by Mauricio Cardozo Ocampo (Portuguese lyrics by Pedro Bento).

No.	Title	English title	Length
1.	"My Boss Is a Corpse"		5:13
2.	"GrAttitude"		4:44
3.	"Facing Temptation"		4:21
4.	"The Best Singer in the World"		4:51
5.	"Troll"		5:07
6.	"Stalker"		4:56
7.	"Socorro"	Help	2:31
8.	"Rebuilding Destruction"		5:52
9.	"I Bloody Love to Love You"		5:07
10.	"Haters Gonna Hate"		7:00
11.	"What If I Never Speed?" (John Dowland cover)		2:40
12.	"Hipócrita"	Hypocrite	3:34
13.	"Provoke Yourself"		5:14
14.	"Galopeira" (Chitãozinho & Xororó cover)		2:48

== Personnel ==
- Bruno Sutter – vocals, electric guitar, bass guitar, production
- Bruno Valverde – drums
- Michel Leme – lead guitar (track 4)
- Wagner Bernardes – acoustic guitar (track 11), production
- Lou Alves – lead guitar (tracks 2 and 6)
- Márcio Sanches – lead guitar (track 9)
- Guilherme Mateus – lead guitar (track 7)
- Robson Gitcoff – lead guitar (track 12)
- Renato Tribuzy – production
- Eduardo Francisco – cover art
