= Fausto Fanti =

Brazilian humorist (1978–2014)

- Born: Fausto Fanti Jasmin; October 20, 1978; Petrópolis, Rio de Janeiro, Brazil
- Died: July 30, 2014 (aged 35); São Paulo, São Paulo, Brazil
- Resting place: Cemitério Municipal de Petrópolis, Rio de Janeiro, Brazil
- Other names: Renato; Blondie Hammett
- Occupations: Actor; musician; humorist
- Years active: 1999–2014
- Known for: Hermes & Renato, Massacration
- Spouse: Karla Peixoto Sento Sé (m. 1997; sep. 2014)
- Children: 1
- Relatives: Franco Fanti (brother)

Fausto Fanti Jasmin (October 20, 1978 – July 30, 2014) was a Brazilian actor, humorist and musician. He was one of the founding members of the comedy troupe Hermes & Renato (portraying its titular "Renato") and the original guitarist of parodic heavy metal band Massacration under the alias Blondie Hammett.

== Biography ==
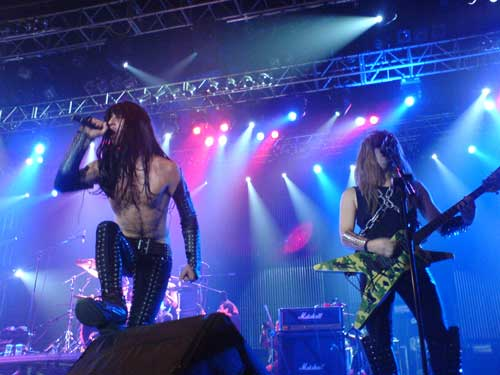
Bruno Sutter (left) and Fanti (right) performing as Detonator and Blondie Hammett respectively at a Massacration concert

Fanti was born in Petrópolis on October 20, 1978. In 1999 he founded Hermes & Renato alongside his friends Marco Antônio Alves, Adriano Silva, Felipe Torres and Bruno Sutter; he briefly attended an advertising course in college before asking for a leave of absence to dedicate himself solely to Hermes & Renato. Known for their off-color humor, frequently reliant on pop culture references, they amassed a strong cult following throughout the late 1990s/early to mid-2000s during their tenure on MTV Brasil. Considered by his peers the group's "leader" and "intellectual mentor", Fanti portrayed some of its most well-known characters, such as the titular "Renato", "Gozo the Clown" (a parody of Bozo), "Padre Gato" ("Hot Priest") and "Blondie Hammett", the guitarist of comedy band Massacration; he also served as one of Massacration's main lyricists/composers alongside Bruno Sutter. Hermes & Renato briefly changed its name to "Banana Mecânica" from 2010 to 2013 after leaving MTV to join Record, recovering the former name after returning to MTV, where they stayed until the channel ceased its activities.

Throughout most of his life Fausto suffered from bouts of depression; his brother Franco Fanti would elaborate that, during his final years, he was "obsessive", "on the verge of paranoia and not taking any antidepressants". According to statements by his acquaintances, his mental health was also further negatively affected following the separation process from his wife, Karla Peixoto Sento Sé, which began in early 2014; they married in 1997, having together a daughter, Nina (8 years old at the time of her father's death). On July 30, 2014, he was found dead on his bathroom at his apartment in the bairro of Perdizes, West Zone of São Paulo, with a belt around his neck, by his wife and two of his Hermes & Renato colleagues, Adriano Silva and Marco Antônio Alves; the attorney investigating the case stated that, "without a doubt", it was a suicide. In a statement to news portal R7.com, a close friend of Fanti's who asked to remain anonymous would compare his death to the case of Charlie Brown Jr. vocalist Chorão, who also sunk into depression following his separation from his companion and had died following a cocaine overdose the year prior.

His wake was held at the Cemitério do Araçá, and his body was later taken to be buried at his hometown of Petrópolis. Franco eventually replaced Fausto on Hermes & Renato when it went to FX in 2015; in 2019 he stated that he himself had been diagnosed with bipolar II disorder, and began using his social media to chronicle his struggles with mental illness.

== Discography ==
Massacration

- 2005 – Gates of Metal Fried Chicken of Death
- 2009 – Good Blood Headbanguers
