= José Castelo Branco =

Portuguese television presenter (born 1954)

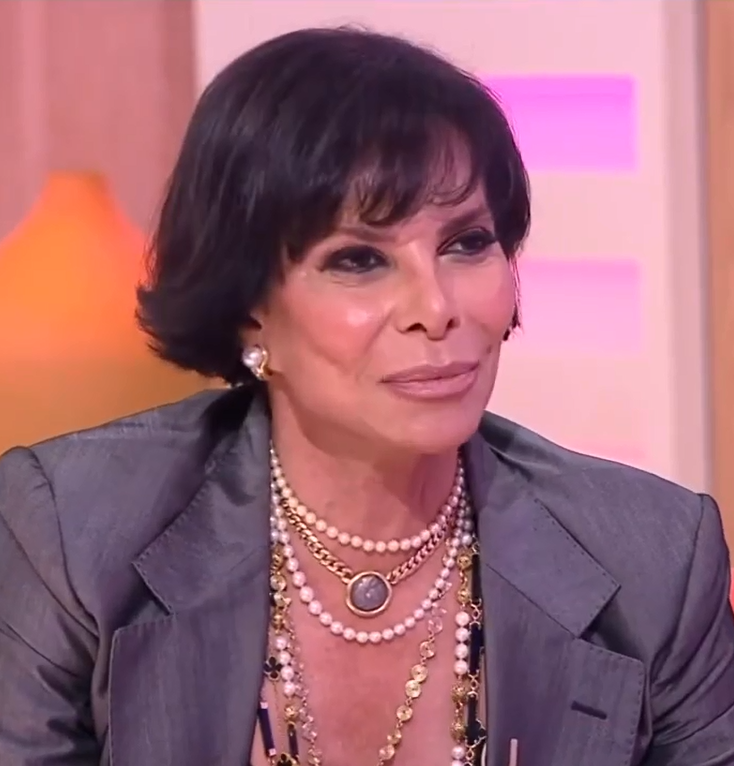
- José Castelo Branco in 2024
- Born: José Alberto Castelo Branco da Silva Vieira; 8 December 1962 (age 63); Tete, Portuguese Mozambique
- Occupations: TV Personality; Reality TV Star
- Spouses: Maria Pólvora (m. 1986; div. 1990) Betty Graffstein (m. 1996)
- Children: Guilherme Pólvora Castelo Branco Vieira

José Alberto Castelo Branco da Silva Vieira (born December 8, 1962) is a Portuguese socialite, influencer and former art dealer. He has become best known for his activities as a television personality, namely through his participation in reality shows. He also works and performs as a singer.

== Biography ==
José Castelo Branco is the son of Francisco José Joaquim Frutuoso da Silva Vieira (Reis Magos, Bardez, Goa, 14 August 1905 - 1988) - who was the paternal grandson of Caetano Diogo Óscar da Silva Vieira and great-grandson of Julião José da Silva Vieira. His mother was Inês Paulina Castelo Branco (Tete, 24 December 1921 - Lisbon, 16 December 2014), whose mother was a native Mozambican. José Castelo Branco was the youngest of three children. His brothers include Sérgio Vieira, a Mozambican politician and poet. José Castelo Branco also has family ties to former Portuguese Prime Minister António Costa.

He was born and raised in the city of Tete, in northern Mozambique, then a Portuguese overseas province, where he spent his childhood until the age of twelve. He then moved to Lisbon, living in Santo António dos Cavaleiros. He became known in Lisbon's nightlife, having created his alter-ego Tatiana Romanov. In the 1990s, he became friends with the socialite Lili Caneças, already a very popular figure in the Portuguese jet-set. At the beginning of the decade, he became an art dealer at a gallery in Cascais.

In Loures, on 19 March 1986, he married his first wife, Maria Arlene Ferreira Pólvora (1 August 1960), with whom he had his only son, Guilherme Pólvora Castelo Branco Vieira, born on 25 November 1988. The couple divorced in 1990 and she married for the second time. In Loures, on 27 November 1996, Castelo Branco remarried, in a registry office, to the American widow Betty Grafstein, born Elizabeth Larner. They shared their home between Sintra and New York until the mid-2010s, when they lived almost exclusively in the US city.

Castelo Branco was approached by El Mundo and appeared on a programme on the Antena 3 television station in Madrid, where he revealed previously unknown facts about his life. In June 2010 he released his autobiography, José Castelo Branco - The Whole Truth.

== Television ==
José Castelo Branco became better known through his participation in the first edition of Quinta das Celebridades, a reality TV show on TVI, along with other public figures who are more or less known to the Portuguese public, including Brazilian actor Alexandre Frota, who kissed him on camera at the end of the programme, when Castelo Branco was named the winner.

In 2005, following the media success he achieved with his participation in Quinta das Celebridades, he presented the programme Bon Chic on TVI, in a setting that suited his personal taste. However, the weekly programme presented by the socialite was far from a ratings success. In the same year, he shared the lead role in Trio Maravilha (TVI), a comedy series based on sketches, with Alexandre Frota and another contestant from the first edition of Quinta das Celebridades, businessman Jorge Monte Real.

Later that year, he took part in another TVI reality show, 1ª Companhia, along with other public figures, including Alexandre Frota once again. The following year, he took part in another reality show, Circo das Celebridades. During these three reality shows, José Castelo Branco was involved in arguments with Alexandre Frota, Ana Maria Lucas, Cinha Jardim, Pedro Ramos e Ramos, Sara Aleixo, Miguel Melo and Nuno Homem de Sá. He also took part in a number of other reality TV shows.

In 2008, José Castelo Branco joined the panel of the Calor da Tarde programme - a space dedicated to celebrity issues - on SIC's Contacto afternoon progrmame.

In April 2011, Castelo Branco was one of the contestants on another TVI reality show, Perdidos na Tribo. Castelo Branco travelled to Namibia to settle with the Himba tribe, along with Marta Cardoso (presenter and former Big Brother 1 contestant), Vera Ferreira (former Casa dos Segredos 1 contestant) and Sérgio Vicente (former Big Brother 2 contestant). The group headed to the tribe on 4 April 2011 to start recording the programme.

In 2013, a reality show focusing on José Castelo Branco's day-to-day life, As Aventuras do Zé, was broadcast on the subscription channel MVM. In the same year, José Castelo Branco was tipped to be one of the main contestants on Big Brother VIP on TVI, but ended up taking part in Splash! Celebridades, on SIC. In the same year, he took part in SIC's Olé programme, where he was a pitchfork. He will continue at SIC until 2015, as an outdoor reporter for the entertainment programme Portugal em Festa.

At the beginning of 2015, he took part as a guest in Secret Story - Casa dos Segredos: Luta pelo Poder. In that reality show, he was assaulted by Zezé Camarinha, another television personality. It was also on this reality show that José Castelo Branco met Vera Ferreira, a contestant from his Lost in the Tribe team.

=== Television projects ===
Year	Project	Notes	Channel
2004	Quinta das Celebridades (Season 1)	Contestant	TVI
2005	Trio Maravilha	Actor	TVI
2005	Bon Chic	Host	TVI
2005	1.ª Companhia (Season 1)	Contestant	TVI
2006	Circo das Celebridades	Contestant	TVI
2008	Contacto	Commentator	SIC
2011	Perdidos na Tribo	Contestant	TVI
2013	Splash! Celebridades	Contestant	SIC
2013	Olé	Contestant	SIC
2013 - 2015	Portugal em Festa	Outdoors reporter	SIC
2013	As Aventuras do Zé	Host	MVM
2015	Secret Story - Casa dos Segredos: Luta pelo Poder	Special feature	TVI

== Music career ==
Castelo Branco prepared to enter the music world with the release of his first album, mostly in English - including a few in Portuguese - in the first quarter of 2008. The album was produced by Luís Jardim, who is known among big musical stars such as Cher and the Rolling Stones. José Castelo Branco also had Rui de Matos as his singing teacher. Initially, Castelo Branco released a five-song album (published by iPlay), which was successfully sold in conjunction with Caras magazine.

On 7 November 2008, the album Oui, C'est Moi was officially launched at the Worten shop in Centro Comercial Vasco da Gama, at an autograph session where José Castelo Branco was accompanied by his son, Guilherme, his wife, Betty Grafstein, his mother, Nini Castelo Branco, and some friends. The music video for the single ‘In the City’ was shot in New York by some of Madonna's production team and renowned producers.

In June 2011, José Castelo Branco released a music video for a remix of the song Patapata - a cover of the song 'Pata Pata' (1967) by Miriam Makeba - one of the tracks on his album. Later, in 2013, the remix would become the opening and closing theme of José Castelo Branco's reality TV show on the MVM channel, As Aventuras do Zé.

== Online presence ==
Since the mid-2010s - after taking up residence almost exclusively in New York and, as such, ceasing to be a regular presence on Portuguese television - Castelo Branco has also made a name for himself as an influencer on Instagram, where he advertises various brands, of which Prozis is one example. On 5 June 2024, the socialite's Instagram profile was followed by more than 430,000 accounts. José Castelo Branco's number of Instagram followers rose considerably in the weeks following the revelation of Betty Grafstein's accusations of marital violence against her husband.

In September 2019, Castelo Branco created a YouTube channel, which was especially active during the peak of the COVID-19 pandemic, with Castelo Branco starting to post videos regularly in July 2020. On the channel, among other things, the socialite tells stories about his life and the TV shows he's been on, as well as playing a character, Dr. Zezé.

== Political ambitions ==
In October 2012, José Castelo Branco announced that he would run for Sintra Town Council as an independent in the local elections the following year. However, the candidacy did not go ahead in the end.

On 1 June 2019, Castelo Branco announced in a video on the social network Instagram that he would be running in the 2019 Portuguese legislative elections. The following day, he gathered a team to help collect signatures for the creation of his political party, whose name would be 'MJP - Portuguese Justice Movement'. The socialite justified his candidacy with his indignation about abstention in the 2019 European elections in Portugal and the various cases of corruption that have been uncovered, and planned to return to Portugal to campaign. However, in mid-August 2019, he announced that he had given up his candidacy due to his wife's health complications, which forced him to return to the USA.

In 2022, José Castelo Branco said that he was on a par with Marcelo Rebelo de Sousa and that he would be an excellent choice to replace him as President of Portugal.

== Controversies ==
=== Court cases ===
In November 2003, both Castelo Branco and Betty Grafstein were arrested at Lisbon Airport for carrying more than 100 pieces of jewellery of undeclared origin. After being brought before the judge of the Lisbon Criminal Investigation Court, Grafstein was released, while Castelo Branco remained in detention, to be heard the following day at the Department of Investigation and Criminal Action. The art dealer was eventually released that same day.

In 2005, Castelo Branco allegedly assaulted a contractor who was doing work on his house, claiming that the man had taken 20,000 euros from him and had not completed the work. Because of this, in 2011, the Sintra court sentenced the socialite to 90 hours of community work.

In 2009, José Castelo Branco was accused of assault by public relations officer Daniel Martins after an argument in a Lisbon restaurant. In court, he was sentenced to nine months in prison with a suspended sentence for the offences of insulting physical integrity, defamation and libel, and had to pay compensation of 1,000 euros to the plaintiff. However, the payment was never made and, on 13 November 2018, two solicitors were sent to José Castelo Branco's house in Sintra to assess possible assets for seizure and payment of the debt.

In 2011, at a Portuguese golden Globes after party in Lisbon, José Castelo Branco pushed - as he himself admitted - Daniel Martins' head with his forehead, having confronted the PR man - with whom he already had disagreements - claiming that the latter had put José Castelo Branco's mother "in a wheelchair", referring to his opinion that a stroke his mother had suffered was due to Daniel Martins' 'intrigues'. Martins filed a complaint at a police station in Lisbon.

In September 2022, he was ordered to pay a fine of 550 euros for having stolen a Dior perfume from the duty-free shop at Lisbon Airport. The socialite, who had previous convictions for offences against the memory of a deceased person, threats, offences against physical integrity and defamation, was absent using a doctor's certificate.

In April 2024, in a restaurant in Bairro Alto, José Castelo Branco put his hands around another customer's neck and made xenophobic remarks, after allegedly hearing comments about Betty Grafstein in the restaurant that he found unpleasant, claiming that he had been the victim of bullying.

=== Sex scandals ===
In 2011, José Castelo Branco's name was involved in a sex scandal, in what became informally known as the 'orgies case': it was revealed that in 2006 the socialite took part in a sexual act, which was recorded and ended up on pornographic websites, with a couple whose female member complained that her husband coerced her into taking part in sexual acts with other people, and also accused him of domestic violence. In January 2012, José Castelo Branco - who stated several times that in this recording (which shows José Castelo Branco having sex with both members of the couple) he was 'on drugs' - testified at the Famalicão Court in the context of this case. The male member of the couple was eventually sentenced to six years and six months in prison for domestic violence and possession of illegal weapons.

=== Comments regarding rape ===
In 2012, when talking about the traumatic rape he suffered at the age of eight - at the hands of a cousin's boyfriend - José Castelo Branco told Nova Gente magazine that, if that hadn't happened, he would be homosexual.

In 2021, the socialite said the following on Instagram: 'Most of the rapes that happen in Portugal, especially to so-called "minor" children, from the age of 13/14, are provoked by the girls themselves (...) and kids'. The television personality and influencer also added the following statement: 'Poor supposed "rapists" who are not to blame... I mean, they're to blame too, because they should know who they're messing with...'.

In May 2024, the socialite took part in an online debate on Cdk, organised by the controversial businessman Miguel Milhão - known for his conservative political positions and owner of Prozis (whose products Castelo Branco promotes online) - on the subject of homosexuality. In this debate, which also included far-right and anti-LGBT activist Afonso Gonçalves - who in 2023 had disrupted LGBT events in Évora and Lisbon by shouting with a megaphone. Castelo Branco again made controversial statements regarding the sexual abuse of minors, claiming that '[a] child is sensual, a child likes to sit on an adult's lap'. Before that, José Castelo Branco was called a 'pedophile' by another far-right figure, former judge Rui Fonseca e Castro, who didn't provide any justification or evidence for the accusation.

=== Domestic violence allegations ===
On April 20, 2024, his wife, Betty Grafstein, was admitted to CUF Cascais hospital, after an alleged fall, with injuries to her body, including a fractured femur. However, on May 2, 2024, the socialite reported her husband to health professionals for alleged acts of domestic violence. As a result of the accusations, Castelo Branco was arrested by the GNR in the Estoril area and taken to the Sintra Court on the morning of May 7, 2024, shortly before being directed to TVI, to be interviewed on Dois às 10, a morning format where he would be talking to Cristina Ferreira and Cláudio Ramos about the matter. Castelo Branco was legally prevented from being less than a kilometer away from where his wife was and from contacting her. On May 24, an electronic ankle bracelet was placed.

In May 2024, the Feira Group, owner of the Feira dos Sofás brand, announced a few days later that it had broken off its advertising partnership with the socialite due to the accusations. The day after the accusations reached the media, a video was published in which José Castelo Branco slaps Pedro Pico, a public figure who is currently the tenant of the Sintra house belonging to Grafstein and where she lived for several years with José Castelo Branco. This happened after Pedro Pico said that José Castelo Branco had hit Betty Grafstein.

In early June 2024, Grafstein's son Roger Basile took his mother back to the United States. Later in the same month, the electronic ankle bracelet was removed from the defendant.

In June 2024, it was notified that after reviewing the coercive measures applied to Castelo Branco due to suspicions of domestic violence, with a view to handing over his three passports (Portuguese, Mozambican and North American) to the authorities, presenting himself at the police station in the area of residence once a week and prohibiting contact, by any means, with the victim. Subsequently, the defendant's defense announced that it would appeal this decision.

In July of the same year, the Court of Sintra changed the coercive measures attributed to the accused, ceasing to be mandatory weekly meetings at a GNR station and maintaining the others already applied. In October 2024, the press revealed that in the proceedings relating to the contentious divorce request between Grafstein and José Castelo Branco, it was stated that the violence exercised by Castelo Branco against Grafstein and the former's infidelity were the main arguments supporting that divorce request.

According to TV7Dias magazine, the British-born socialite claims that she began to be a victim of regular physical and psychological violence by Castelo Branco a year after their marriage, which began in 1996.

On November 4, 2024, José Castelo Branco was accused of domestic violence by the Public Prosecutor's Office, which detailed that it was indicted "that, since the beginning of the marriage, the accused physically and verbally assaulted the victim". The complaint specifies that "the accused forced the victim to wear clothes that he had escorted, to have his makeup applied and to wear shoes that caused her pain" and that the accused (...) "acted with the specific purpose of mistreating the victim, aged 95, harassing her body and mental health, insulting her and frightening her (...) being aware of her age". Before the Public Prosecutor's Office's statement, José Castelo Branco had denied all the accusations made against him since Grafstein was admitted to CUF in Cascais.

== Personal life ==
José Castelo Branco has a granddaughter called Constança, born in December 2021. Constança is the daughter of his only son, Guilherme. The socialite is a Catholic and often mentions his faith. José told Vanity Fair that because he was a Catholic, he would never commit suicide.

== Queer impact in Portugal ==
In 2011, Isabel Coutinho, from the newspaper Público stated, 'with José Castelo Branco, discussions about gender and sexual identity have entered the national mainstream, in the middle of prime time'.

José Castelo Branco addressed the bullying he was subjected to during his youth in a video he recorded in 2012 for the Tudo Vai Melhorar/It Gets Better Portugal campaign, which aimed to raise awareness about bullying perpetrated against LGBTQ young people.

For André Murraças' Queerquivo project, Gonçalo Cota wrote that José Castelo Branco's visibility "was fundamental (...) in showing the multiplicity of identity arrangements", also highlighting that it was with the socialite that he first heard the word "queer" "being inverted from its negative meaning and contributing to a somewhat politicized stance of self-determination".

In December 2024, Google revealed that, when it came to Portuguese personalities, José Castelo Branco's name was the fastest-growing search term on the company's search engine in 2024 compared to the previous year. This happened in the year that the socialite was accused of marital violence by what was, at the time of the accusation, his wife of more than 27 years, Betty Grafstein.
