= Falcão (singer) =

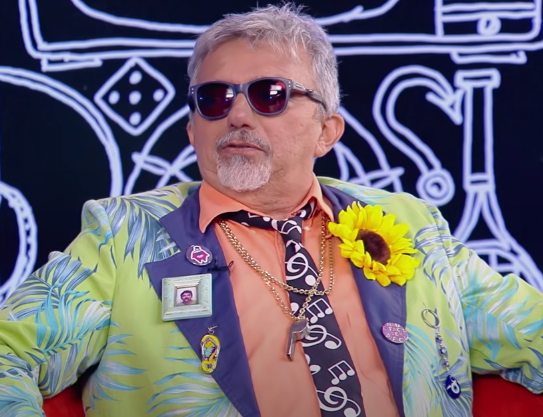
- Falcão in May 2019 on Tom Cavalcante's television show, on Multishow
- Born: Marcondes Falcão Maia; September 16, 1957 (age 69); Pereiro, Ceará, Brazil
- Occupations: Singer-songwriter, television presenter, humorist, actor
- Years active: 1990–present
- Musical career
- Genres: Comedy; Comedy Rock; Brega

Marcondes Falcão Maia (born September 16, 1957), better known by his stage name Falcão, is a Brazilian singer-songwriter, actor, television presenter, and humorist. Recording on brega and comedy rock genres, Falcão has released nine studio albums, and popular songs "I'm Not Dog No", "Black People Car", "Holiday Foi Muito", "Homem é Homem" and "I Love You Tonight."

Usually labeled as "irreverent" by the media, Falcão's albums has sold over one million copies as of 2014.

== Early life ==
Falcão was born in Pereiro, a town of Ceará, where he lived until 12 years. Influenced by his father, a pharmacist and the only owner of a radio in the town, he listened to a variety of music: from Waldick Soriano to Italian music, and from Nelson Gonçalves to the Beatles. In 1970, his family moved to Fortaleza, where he attended Júlia Jorge school and learned to play guitar.

In 1978, Falcão obtained a degree as technician for edifications at the Ceará Federal Technical School. After four years working as draftsman of architecture, he enters the Federal University of Ceará to course Architecture. At the same time, he, along with some friends, establish the publication Um Jornal Sem Regras, where they published some compositions of they band o Bufo-Bufo. In 1988, he obtained his degree in Architecture, and along with two friends he opened an office in 1989, which worked until 1991.

== Career ==
In 1988, Falcão participated at a music contest organized by Banco do Brasil along with one of his friends, Tarcísio Matos, who worked there. In contrast of the songs presented, he sang a brega bolero using colorful clothing, which would become his trade mark. Although he was rejected by critics, the public applauded him. At the Christmas night, he did his first solo show. After some public request, he recorded his first album, Bonito, Lindo e Joiado, which contained his first major hit, "I'm Not Dog No." The song, and adaptation of Soriano's hit "Eu Não Sou Cachorro Não", was done in response to the high number of English-language music in Brazilian radios. The independent album was taken by Beto Barbosa to the record label Continental, which re-released it in 1991.

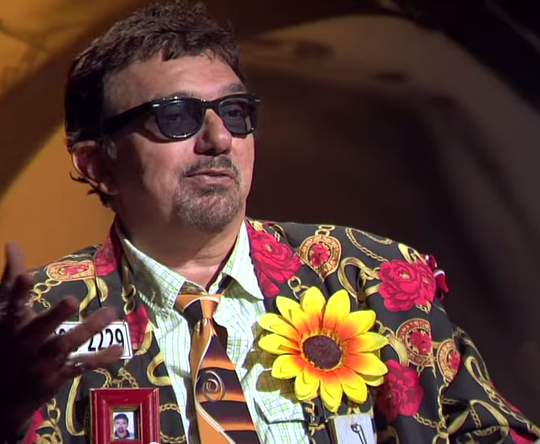
Falcão in 2015

He was signed by BMG in 1994 after Raimundo Fagner showed them a Compact Cassette of Falcão's songs. Fagner and Robertinho de Recife then produced his second album, O Dinheiro não É Tudo, mas É 100%. On this work, he was advised to try again to adapt a successful brega song, and he wrote "Black People Car" based on Almir Rogério's "Fuscão Preto." His following work, A Besteira É a Base da Sabedoria (1995), which sold over 240,000 copies, became the best-selling album of his career. He recorded other two albums, A Um Passo da MPB (1996) and Quanto Pior, Melhor (1998), for BMG. In 1998, he starred his own show as presenter of Falcão na Contramão on Rede Bandeirantes.

Under the Abril Music label, Falcão released 500 Anos de Chifre, with songs about cuckolds. His seventh disc, Do Penico à Bomba Atômica, was released by Fortaleza's label SomZoom. In the following year, he published the book Leruaite - Dog's Au-Au It's Not Nhac-Nhac, with sentences he have said on interviews and liner notes of his albums after a publisher requested him to talk about his "philosophy". In 2006, What Porra Is This?, an album published by NC Music, marked the first time his band, Diarréia, recorded along with him.

In 2011, Falcão appeared on the film Um Assalto De Fé, which satirizes protestant Churches, as a pop-star pastor. Falcão went into starring his own talk show, Leruaite, on TV Ceará in 2012. Cine Holliúdy, a 2012 Brazilian film, also had a character portrayed by Falcão, the blind Isaías. In 2014, he released independently his ninth album, Sucessão de Sucessos que se Sucedem Sucessivamente sem Cessar.

== Discography ==
- Bonito, Lindo e Joiado (1990)
- O Dinheiro não É Tudo, mas É 100% (1994)
- A Besteira É a Base da Sabedoria (1995)
- A Um Passo da MPB (1996)
- Quanto Pior, Melhor (1998)
- 500 Anos de Chifre (1999)
- Do Penico à Bomba Atômica (2000)
- Maxximum: Falcão (compilation, 2005)
- What Porra Is This? (2006)
- Sucessão de Sucessos que se Sucedem Sucessivamente sem Cessar (2014)
