= Heavy Metal Machines =

2018 video game

- Developer: Hoplon Infotainment
- Publisher: Hoplon Infotainment
- Platforms: Microsoft Windows; Xbox One; PS4
- Release: September 19, 2018
- Genres: MOBA, MMO
- Mode: Multiplayer

Heavy Metal Machines (HMM) was a car battle MOBA video game developed and published by Hoplon Infotainment. HMM was a free-to-play game available on Steam, where teams of four battle on arenas with a post-apocalyptic scenario with highly armed machines. The primary objective is to deliver a bomb on the enemy team base while trying to overcome your opponents and avoid the arena's hazards. The overall theme of the game is based on heavy metal music and its culture. The game was in production since 2013 and was officially launched in 2018, September 19.

One of the main inspirations for the game was the classic Rock n' Roll Racing, originally released in 1993 for the Super NES and Sega Genesis, developed by Blizzard Entertainment, but also on arena games such as the vehicular combat titles Rocket League and Twisted Metal.

On May 3, 2022, it was announced that Heavy Metal Machines would shut down on August 30 the same year.

== Gameplay ==
Despite the MOBA label, Heavy Metal Machines does not follow the traditional genre mechanics, mainly because it does not have towers, lanes and minions — which are essential in traditional MOBAs. Another thing that made HMM stand out from other MOBA games is the speed of the game, where the battles happen with full power in the first few seconds in the match, and there's no need to level up your pilot during the game or build items to destroy your opponents and deliver the bomb.

To control the vehicle, the player uses the mouse to accelerate or reverse, and the keyboard to fire his weapons. The machine follows the direction your mouse dot is pointing, which is used to turn and to aim your weapons.

The objective of the game is to capture and deliver a bomb to the opponent's base. To do so, the player carrying the bomb must go through the whole circuit, with very sharp turns and hazards everywhere, such as lava (much damage per second) and Droppers (particular areas that force the character to drop the bomb if he goes through it). Players that are not carrying the bomb may take shortcuts through the course to help or destroy the carrier. These shortcuts are closed to the player carrying the bomb.

=== Roles ===
All characters in the game are divided into one of three roles: Interceptor, Support or Transporter.

- Interceptor: The Interceptors are specialized in preventing enemies from taking the bomb. They have strong push capacity or good damage. Their goal is to take the bomb from the enemy!
- Support: The Supports are focused on helping carriers deliver the bomb by repairing and protecting them while also disrupting the enemy.
- Transporter: The Transporters are experts in delivering the bomb to the enemy base. Resistance, speed and agility are some of their skills.

=== Arenas ===
In Heavy Metal Machines, the pilots battle for the bomb on three different arenas.

- Metal God: Considered the coliseum of Metal City, this arena is the main stage for the HMM Official Championships. This battlefield is perfect for trying the classic team composition: one Transporter, one Support, and two Interceptors. You must avoid the spots with droppers and trust on the team work.
- Temple of Sacrifice: This track was the place for the sacrifices of the heretics from Metal City. Now, it is a place for the most insane combats on HMM, where teams battle to survive different hazards, from lava pools to a shredder at the end of the course. Temple of Sacrifice is a survival trial: make your team with two supports, one transporter, and one interceptor to make it to the end.
- Cursed Necropolis: Sacred land, once it was Windrider's tribe homeland. Nowadays, on this cursed land, acid is all that remains after a carnage. Similar to the Metal God arena on its playability, this track features two different hazards: treadmills change your direction and speed, and the bomb reflectors repel the bomb if you hit them.

=== In-game currencies ===
- XP: Completing Metal Pass Missions or just playing the game rewards XP points that go towards the Metal Pass progression on the current season.
- Cash: As the paid currency in the game, the player can acquire Cash by purchasing them using real-world currencies. The game also rewards the player with small amounts of this currency as part of its Metal Pass rewards.
- Fame: It is the easier in-game currency to earn for free and can be earned as a reward from the Metal Pass and from matches.

== Pilots ==
The characters of the game, called Pilots, have their lore and reasons to enter the arena. There are currently 17 characters in the game, and Hoplon—HMM's developer—will introduce new pilots and other contents on every season, which commonly happens every two months.

- Artificer
- Black Lotus
- Clunker
- Ice bringer
- Little Monster
- Metal Herald
- Rampage
- Wildfire
- Wind rider
- Full Metal Judge
- Dirt Devil
- Stargazer
- Stingray
- Photon
- Killer J
- Peacemaker
- Vulture

== Metal League ==
The Metal League is an in-game event that creates a tournament based on the teams' score ranking, with a prize pool of €5,000 besides items in the game.

=== Basic Mechanics ===
This system will work side by side with the Teams feature that's already in the game. Only subscribed teams will be able to take part. The tournaments in this new feature will be disputed in two phases: Qualifiers and Playoffs. To get in the brackets' stage, the teams will need to score during the Qualifiers.

With this feature, the game will get a new exclusive queue that will be available only on Saturdays at specific hours. In other words, get a space on your schedule to play on Saturdays. The Metal League will follow the Metal Pass' seasons, and the matches will be disputed on specific regions. The first season will roll out only in Europe, and on May the tournaments will also take place on the United States and Brazil servers.

=== Qualifiers Phase ===
This phase will happen on Saturdays, more specifically, this Saturday 9th, from 14h to 20h GMT 0. In this first season, there will only be 6 qualifiers steps, and the 8 teams that achieve the highest score will automatically be in the Playoffs Phase of the tournament.

=== Playoffs Phase ===
This is the final phase of the Metal League, where the 8 best teams from the qualifiers will fight for the prize money. If you've seen the European and South American Championships from 2017, the format will be similar to them. There won't be any queues, and the teams from the brackets will fight in custom matches. Here, the winners will be decided in best of three matches, with single eliminations.

=== Prizes ===
The total prize is €5,000,00, shared between the 4 best teams from the brackets, like this:

- 1st place – €2,000,00
- 2nd place – €1,500,00
- 3rd place – €1,000,00
- 4th place – €500,00

== Metal Pass ==
Metal Pass is a system in which Heavy Metal Machines players have access to weekly challenges and in-game rewards, in addition to determining your account's progression and Fame income so you can purchase characters and models.

Everyone participates automatically – and for free – in the Metal Pass, and upon overcoming each level, you can unlock rewards associated with it. Each step includes free rewards and, in the Premium version, special rewards themed on the season.

The Premium version guarantees you'll receive the double amount of items per level, as well as making you progress faster through the season. It's obtained with Cash, a currency that can be purchased in the game's Store.

== Soundtrack ==
The game has an original soundtrack of heavy metal music. Other than the tracks used on the menus, loading screens and during the matches, each character also has their own track, based on their favorite fictional music style.

- Artificer - Techno Classic
- Black Lotus - Dharma Metal
- Clunker - Redneck Rock
- Little Monster - Ultra Heavy Metal
- Metal Herald - Ozzyrian Chant
- Rampage - Rage’n’Roll
- Wildfire - Melting Metalcore
- Windrider - Native Folk Rock
- Full Metal Judge - Wasteland Rock
- Dirt Devil - Corsair Metal
- Stingray - D'rude'n'storm
- Photon - Progressive Wave
- Killer J - Psyclowntic Metal
