= Gil Brother =

Brazilian humorist and YouTuber (1957–2023)

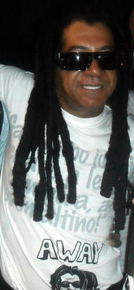
- Gil in 2013
- Born: Jaime Gil da Costa; 29 July 1957; Petrópolis, Rio de Janeiro, Brazil
- Died: 3 December 2023 (aged 66); Rio de Janeiro, Rio de Janeiro, Brazil
- Resting place: Cemitério de Santo Aleixo, Magé, Rio de Janeiro, Brazil
- Other names: Brother Away; Away de Petrópolis; Away Nilzer
- Occupations: Actor; humorist; dancer; YouTuber
- Years active: 2002–2023
- Known for: Hermes & Renato

Jaime Gil da Costa (29 July 1957 – 3 December 2023), known variously as Gil Brother, Brother Away, Away de Petrópolis, Away Nilzer, or simply as Away, was a Brazilian actor, humourist, dancer, and YouTuber. Known for his quirky, no-nonsense demeanour, acerbic sense of humour, and frequent reliance on foul language and malapropisms, he reached fame during his stint as a member of the comedy troupe Hermes & Renato from 2002 to 2008, gaining further proeminence in the early 2010s after joining YouTube.

== Life and career ==
Jaime Gil da Costa was born in Petrópolis, Rio de Janeiro on 29 July 1957, to machinist Augusto Carneiro da Costa and housewife Vânia Maria Pacheco Costa. Raised in poverty from childhood, he had to work to make ends meet – initially selling sweets made by his mother in the streets, and later as a flanelinha. By 1985, Gil had acquired a passion for dancing; he was inspired by soul and funk artists such as Little Richard and James Brown which he grew up listening to, and he began performing in commercial spaces and bus stations for money. He frequently clashed with the police and ended up being arrested multiple times. Due to his tendency to get into brawls, he suffered a retinal detachment in his left eye which made it blind. It was around this time when he received his nickname "Brother Away", because of his typical shouts of "Away!" as he danced. Later, he turned this into his catchphrase.

In 2002, fellow Petrópolis-based comedy troupe Hermes & Renato, long acquainted with Gil, invited him to partake in an interstitial for MTV Brasil after spotting him washing cars in the street, in exchange for food. Following positive fan reception, he then became a full-fledged member of Hermes & Renato. Initially he played one-time characters for their sketches, the most memorable of them being the lawyer "Dr. Gilmar" for their parodic telenovela Sinhá Boça, until he began hosting his own, such as the fan-favourite "Cozinha do Away". He abruptly cut ties with the troupe in 2008 citing creative differences as well as contractual and payment issues; according to Gil, he was being underpaid, and he compared his tenure with the troupe to "slave labor". He also ended up suing them, but the lawsuit did not move forward. His allegations would later be rebutted by Hermes & Renato (then called "Banana Mecânica") in 2011. After eventually making amends, Gil later appeared in many runs of the troupe's theatre play Uma Tentativa de Show beginning in 2019.

Following his experience with Hermes & Renato, Gil announced he no longer intended to appear in media due to fears of censorship, but in 2011 the video production company Jigsaw Produções invited him to open his own YouTube channel, the "Canal Away". Jigsaw ended their contract with Gil in 2013 and deleted his channel, alleging he failed to fulfill certain obligations and explaining their reasoning in an over 30-minute YouTube video. Gil, on his turn, accused Jigsaw of dishonesty. In 2015, he opened a new channel on his own, with the aid of his family.

Gil made his debut as a film actor in 2014, playing a beggar in the parody film Copa de Elite. In 2018, he made a guest appearance in the music video for the song "Rodei o Mundo" by the rock band Strike.

In 2020, he narrated a McDonald's commercial promoting their new McShakes.

== Stroke, final months, and death ==
On 30 May 2023, it was reported that a week prior, on 23 May, Gil had suffered a stroke following an accidental fall in which he hit his head, being rushed to an ICU; his family members set up a crowdfunding page for his medical expenses. Gil's nephew William Passos stated that, according to his doctors, he was recovering well but would probably suffer from after-effects; he lost flexibility of his left arm and leg, but it was, as of yet, unknown if the after-effects would be permanent. On 18 June, Passos announced that his uncle had left the ICU and was transferred to a bedroom at the Hospital Clínico de Corrêas in Petrópolis; he was discharged shortly after.

In October 2023, following another hospital stay due to a case of pneumonia, he was diagnosed with prostate and bladder cancer, eventually dying while undergoing treatment at the Hospital Eduardo Rabello in Senador Vasconcelos, West Zone of Rio de Janeiro, on 3 December 2023, at the age of 66; his wake was held two days later in Campo Grande, Rio de Janeiro, and he was buried at the Cemitério de Santo Aleixo in Magé, where he was living with his nephew during his final years. Former Brazilian president Jair Bolsonaro posted his condolences on X, calling Gil a "true legend of Brazilian humour", and his Hermes & Renato colleagues used their respective social media profiles to pay tribute to him.
