= Hermes & Renato =

Brazilian surreal comedy group

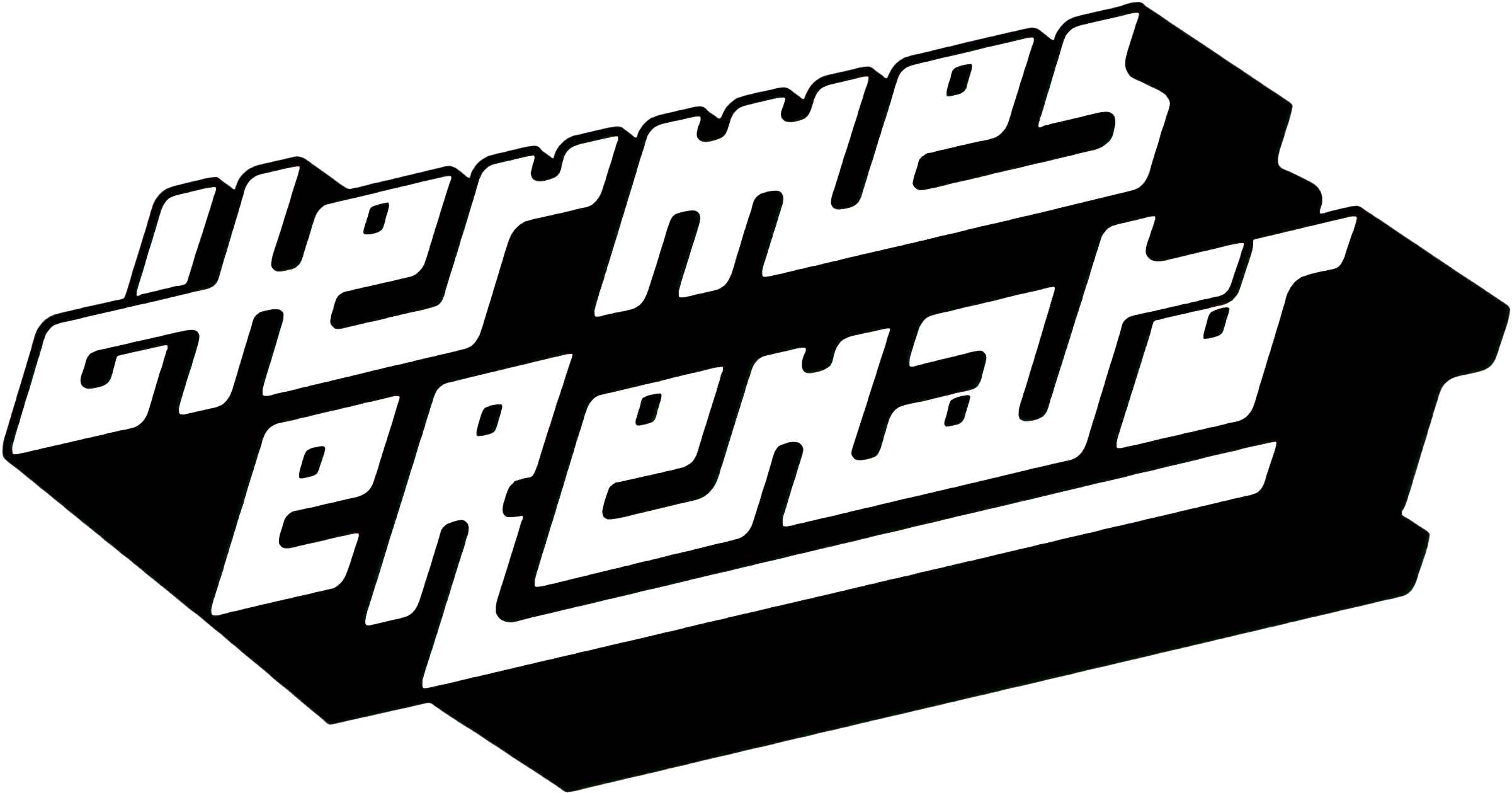
- The group's official logo, used since the early 2000s

Comedy career
- Years active: 1999–present
- Medium: Television; theater; audio recordings
- Genres: Satire; surreal humor; shock humor; black comedy; blue comedy; insult comedy; sketch comedy; improvisational comedy
- Members: Marco Antônio Alves; Adriano Silva; Felipe Torres; Franco Fanti
- Former members: Gil Brother; Bruno Sutter; Fausto Fanti
- Website: HermeseRenato.com.br

Hermes & Renato (known as Banana Mecânica from 2010 to 2013 due to trademark issues with MTV Brasil) is a Brazilian comedy troupe formed in Petrópolis, Rio de Janeiro in 1999 (and based in São Paulo as of 2002) by childhood friends Marco Antônio Alves, Fausto Fanti, Adriano Silva (also occasionally credited as Adriano Pereira, who is also the troupe's only member not to be a Petrópolis native as he was born in the city of Rio de Janeiro), Felipe Torres and Bruno Sutter (later joined by Gil Brother from 2002 to 2008, and by Franco Fanti, Fausto's brother, from 2015 onwards), whose name was taken from the first characters they ever created for their sketches: Hermes, played by Alves, and Renato, played by Fausto. Other characters popularized by them include Luís Boça (Torres) – a geeky, naïve 32-year-old kidult who lives with his grandmother Lourdes (Alves) and speaks in a thick paulistano accent – and Joselito Sem-Noção (Silva) – an inconvenient trickster whose pranks always cause harm to those around him.

Heavily influenced by comedians such as Os Trapalhões, Chespirito, Monty Python and Costinha alongside old pornochanchada films and the 1988–90 television comedy show TV Pirata, and known for their edgy, risqué off-color humor frequently reliant on pop culture references, word plays, puns, catchphrases, foul language and double entendres, they acquired a massive cult following throughout the late 1990s/early to mid-2000s which lasts to the present day, and had their own television programs broadcast at different times by MTV Brasil (1999–2010, 2013), Record (2010–2013, as a segment of variety show Legendários) and FX (2015–2016); from 2004 to 2005 they also had an eponymous radio program, broadcast by São Paulo-based station Mix FM. They were also responsible for creating Tela Class for MTV and idealizing the parodic heavy metal band Massacration.

== History ==
The origins of Hermes & Renato trace back as early as 1990, when Petrópolis-based friends Marco Antônio Alves and Fausto Fanti used to perform comical sketches for fun in their houses under the respective monikers of "Hermes" and "Renato", while recording them with a camcorder; Hermes was taken from a former teacher of one of them, and Renato was a mutual friend whom they liked to joke about. By 1999 they were joined by Adriano Silva, Felipe Torres and Bruno Sutter (all of them long-time friends who occasionally performed together on their amateur sketches), becoming a fully fledged professional comedy troupe, and obtained a contract with MTV Brasil to host their own sketch comedy television program after sending one of their tapes to the network.

During their tenure with MTV, the troupe amassed a strong cult following with their raunchy, unapologetic comedy, and characters and sketches such as "Gozo the Clown" (a parody of Bozo), "Padre Gato" ("Hot Priest"), "Luís Boça", "Joselito Sem-Noção", "Padre Quemedo e o Capeta" ("Priest Quemedo and the Devil", parodying Spanish-born priest Óscar González-Quevedo), the titular "Hermes" and "Renato" – a pair of wily con artists dressed in 1970s attire –, and band Massacration, which would eventually spawn off and release albums and singles, also hosting their own program on MTV, Total Massacration, from 2005 to 2006. They also created Tela Class, a show in which they re-dub old, obscure films creating an entirely different and satirical plot, which lasted for two seasons from 2007 to 2008, and the comical telenovelas Sinhá Boça (parodying Sinhá Moça) and O Proxeneta (parodying O Profeta). In 2000 they made a guest appearance for Charlie Brown Jr.'s music video "Rubão, o Dono do Mundo". Their MTV series was also responsible for launching the career of future YouTuber Gil Brother, who was part of Hermes & Renato from 2002 until his departure in 2008 due to creative divergences and contractual issues. Bruno Sutter left the group in 2012 to focus on his musical career and other solo pursuits. Both of them, however, would continue collaborating sporadically with the troupe as unofficial members.

In 2010 their contract with MTV expired, and they signed with Record to have their own spot at the variety show Legendários, hosted by Marcos Mion. However, since MTV held the rights to most of their original characters and the "Hermes & Renato" name, they were forced to pick a new one; Record then set up a public poll asking fans to choose from "Arrastão", "Banana Mecânica" and "Shock de Monstro" – "Banana Mecânica" ("A Clockwork Banana", referencing the novel/film A Clockwork Orange) ultimately won, with 58% of valid votes. The Banana Mecânica period would be heavily criticized due to censorship from Record though, and the humorists later came to disown most of their work with it. They returned to MTV in 2013, recovering their former name, until the channel went defunct; Hermes & Renato then announced they would be purchasing the name rights in order to branch to digital platforms and other television channels. They opened their official YouTube channel in 2014, where they kept posting new sketches and uploading older ones from their MTV years.

In late 2013 Hermes & Renato signed with FX; their show was scheduled to premiere in late 2014 following a series of interstitials produced by the channel throughout the year, but it was postponed to November of the following year as Fausto Fanti, who was considered the group's "intellectual mentor", committed suicide by hanging at his apartment on July 30, 2014, following increasing bouts of depression. He was subsequently replaced by his brother, Franco Fanti. Their contract with FX expired in 2016.

Hermes & Renato launched their first theater play, Uma Tentativa de Show, in 2017.

In 2020, Felipe Torres joined fellow humorists Paulinho Serra (formerly from Comédia MTV and Pânico na TV), Raul Chequer and Leandro Ramos (both from YouTube and television series Choque de Cultura) to star in the comedy film Abestalhados 2, directed by Marcos Jorge (who previously directed Estômago in 2007) and Marcelo Botta; originally scheduled to be released in early 2021, it eventually came out on October 27, 2022, to positive reviews. The same year, he and Adriano Silva made guest appearances on Comedy Central's sitcom Auto Posto.

In 2021, Torres (as his character Boça) made an appearance on the music video for "Higher Than Your Heels", by Curitiba-based hard rock band Electric Mob. The same year, reprising his role as Charlinho (a character from a popular Hermes & Renato sketch), he was featured in a commercial by McDonald's promoting their fries.

On December 3, 2023, former member Gil Brother died following diagnoses with prostate and bladder cancer.

=== Documentary and cancelled film ===
In 2009, celebrating Hermes & Renato's 10th anniversary, MTV Brasil released an hour-long documentary entitled A Verdadeira História de Hermes & Renato, and the troupe also announced that they began planning a full-length film, scheduled to premiere in movie theaters by 2011; after missing its planned release date no further news emerged, and following the closure of MTV Brasil in 2013 and the suicide of Fausto Fanti in 2014 it was presumably cancelled.

== Members ==
=== Present members ===
- 1999–present: Marco Antônio Alves (Hermes)
- 1999–present: Adriano Silva
- 1999–present: Felipe Torres
- 2015–present: Franco Fanti

=== Past members ===
- 1999–2014: Fausto Fanti (Renato)
- 1999–2012: Bruno Sutter
- 2002–2008: Gil Brother

== See also ==
- Massacration
