= Pereiro, Ceará =

Municipality in Ceará, Brazil

Coordinates: 6°02′42″S 38°27′39″W

Serra de Pereiro
- Municipality
- Flag Coat of arms
- Interactive map of Serra de Pereiro
- Country: Brazil
- Region: Nordeste
- State: Ceará
- Mesoregion: Jaguaribe

Population (2020)
  - Total: 16,331
- Time zone: UTC−3 (BRT)

Pereiro is a municipality located in the state of Ceará in the Northeast region of Brazil.

== See also ==
- List of municipalities in Ceará
