= Costinha (footballer, born 1994) =

Portuguese footballer

Personal information
- Full name: Pedro Miguel Neves da Costa
- Date of birth: 11 March 1994 (age 32)
- Place of birth: Abrantes, Portugal
- Height: 1.87 m (6 ft 2 in)
- Position: Centre-back

Youth career
- 2002–2007: Abrantes Benfica
- 2007–2012: CADE
- 2012–2013: Académica

Senior career*
Years	Team	Apps	(Gls)
2013	Torres Novas		
2013–2014	Naval	19	(3)
2014–2015	Trofense	16	(0)
2015–2016	Louletano	20	(0)
2017–2018	Grevenmacher		
2018–2021	Hamm Benfica	42	(0)
2021–2025	Mondorf-les-Bains	83	(9)
- * Club domestic league appearances and goals as of 17:57, 26 August 2025 (UTC)

Pedro Miguel Neves da Costa (born 11 March 1994 in Abrantes, Santarém District), known as Costinha, is a Portuguese footballer who plays as a central defender.
