= Alexandre Frota =

Brazilian actor and politician (born 1963)

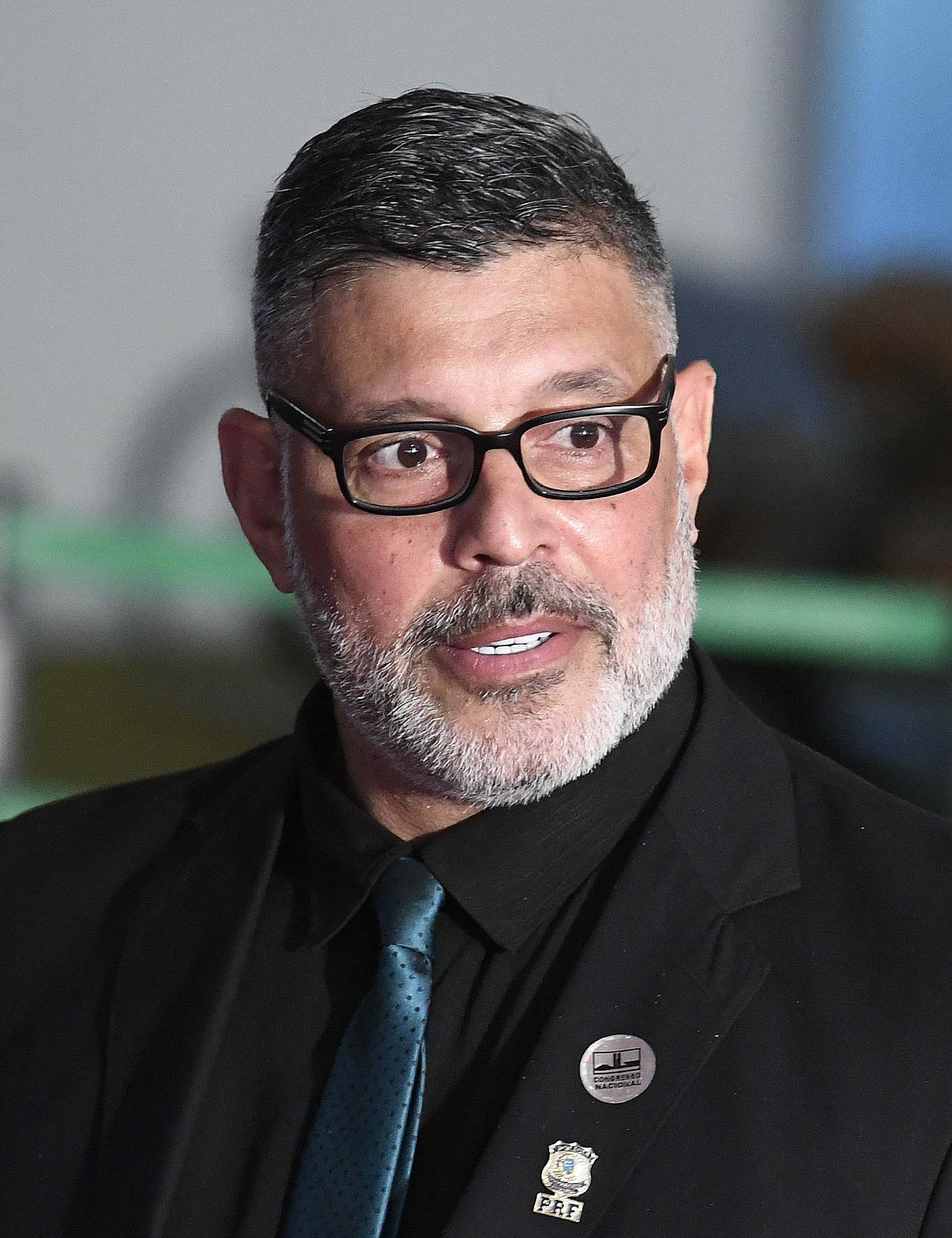
- Frota in 2018

Councillor of Cotia
- Incumbent
- Assumed office 1 January 2025
- Constituency: At-large

Federal Deputy
- In office 1 February 2019 – 1 February 2023
- Constituency: São Paulo

Personal details
- Born: Alexandre Frota de Andrade; 14 October 1963 (age 63) Rio de Janeiro, Guanabara, Brazil
- Party: PDT (2023–present)
- Other political affiliations: PRP (2013–2018); Patriota (2018); PSL (2018−2019); PSDB (2019–2022); PROS (2022); Solidariedade (2022–2023)
- Spouses: Cláudia Raia (m. 1986; div. 1989) Andréa Oliveira (m. 1995; div. 1995) Fabiana Rodrigues (m. 2011)
- Children: Mayã (b. 1998)
- Occupation: Actor; politician

Alexandre Frota de Andrade (born 14 October 1963) is a Brazilian politician and a former model and porn star. A former member of the Social Liberal Party (PSL), Frota was elected Federal Deputy by the state of São Paulo in the 2018 general elections.

== Career ==
=== Acting career ===
His acting career begin in various telenovelas on the Globo TV Network (Rede Globo) and in Brazilian films.

He participated on the Brazilian TV reality show "House of Artists" (Casa dos Artistas) on the SBT network, along with Brazilian rock musician Supla. He also appeared in the "Celebrity Farm" (Quinta das Celebridades) reality show in Portugal where he reached second place, first place being awarded to the controversial José Castelo Branco. Both of these shows were variations on the Big Brother theme. While in Portugal Alexandre Frota appeared in the theatrical spectacle Sex Fever. Later he appeared in another TV reality show "First Company Primeira Companhia, which took the form of a military barracks and again José Castelo Branco participated.

=== Sports ===
Frota has been a practitioner of Brazilian Jiu-Jitsu since 1990 and in 2010 he became the face for a São Paulo project to draw children to the sport. He has a win over fellow actor André Segatti at Oscar de Jiu-Jitsu II tournament in 1998.

In March 2013, it was announced that Frota was drafted to Corinthians Steamrollers, a move mainly seen to serve as publicity for the team. Frota asserted that he was interested in American football since he was 25 but couldn't find the opportunity to practice.

=== Pornographic films ===
In 2004, Frota directed the pornographic film A Boneca da Casa launching the pornographic career of transgender Casa dos Artistas reality show participant Bianca Soares. Starting from 2004 to 2008, he appeared in a series of pornographic films for Brasileirinhas, performing with actresses such as Chloe Jones and Bianca Soares and retired after 00Frota - O Homem da Pistola de Ouro, a porn parody of The Man with the Golden Gun for Sexxxy. In a 2008 interview, he concluded that he saw his pornographic film career as the biggest mistake in his life.

== Personal life ==
Frota was married to telenovela actresses Cláudia Raia (1986–1989) and model Andréa Oliveira (1995-1995) although this second marriage lasted only 33 days. Frota married fitness model and dancer Fabiana Rodrigues in 2011. He has a son named Mayã (b. 1998) from a former relationship with Samantha Lima Gondim.

During Cátia Fonseca's program, Alexandre Frota admitted to being attracted to people of the same sex, but said he was in love with his wife and was well resolved with his sexuality. In response to Marco Feliciano, in an interview with the Morning Show (Rede TV!), he claimed to be pentasexual, that he was once bi, then he was tri and that he will try to be hexa.

== Political career ==
Alexandre Frota has been politically active, having, according to him, founded the Free Brazil Movement (this fact is questioned in the courts). He has been also involved with the "Non-partisan School" movement.

In May 2016, he filed a petition for impeachment against Dilma Rousseff, and supported the president's impeachment.

In May 2018, he supported the strike by truck drivers in Brazil.

Frota was elected federal deputy from the state of São Paulo in the 2018 Brazilian general elections by Social Liberal Party (PSL).

After disrupting his support for President Jair Bolsonaro and abstaining himself from the second round of the voting for the pension reform, the national directory decided to expel him in August 2019, as confirmed by the party's president and also federal deputy, Luciano Bivar.

On August 16, 2019, Frota joined the Brazilian Social Democracy Party (PSDB) at the invitation of the Governor of São Paulo, João Doria.

Frota announced his campaign for President of the Chamber of Deputies in the 2021 election promising to open Bolsonaro impeachment trial if elected. However, he resigned and did not register his application on the day.

== Career in cinema ==
As an actor

- 1984: Os Bons Tempos Voltaram: Vamos Gozar Outra Vez
- 1985: The Adventures of Sergio Mallandro
- 2004: Obsessão
- 2004: A Bela e o Prisioneiro
- 2004: Sexo, Suor e Samba
- 2005: 11 Mulheres e Muito Pó
- 2005: Invasão de Privacidade
- 2006: Anal Total 10
- 2006: Garoto de Programa
- 2007: Na Teia do Sexo
- 2007: A Proibida do Sexo e a Gueixa do Funk
- 2007: Frota, Mônica e Sousa
- 2007: Especial de Natal do Frota
- 2007: Invadindo a Retaguarda
- 2008: Carnaval do Frota
- 2008: United Colors of Celebrities
- 2008: Alexandre Frota Sem Limites
- 2008: Puro Desejo
- 2009: Foda Radical
- 2009: Carnaval do Frota
- 2009: 00 Frota: O Homem da Pistola de Ouro
- 2009: A Última Foda de Frota no Pornô

As a director

- 2004: A Boneca da Casa

== Career in television ==
As an actor

- 1984 - Livre para Voar - Cecílio
- 1985 - Roque Santeiro - Luizão
- 1987 - Sassaricando - Apolo
- 1988 - Chapadão do Bugre - Estevãozinho
- 1989 - Olho por Olho - Rico
- 1989 - Top Model - Raul
- 1990 - Boca do Lixo - Tomás
- 1991 - O Sorriso do Lagarto - Tavinho
- 1992 - Perigosas Peruas - Jaú
- 1995 - Cara & Coroa - Boca
- 1995 - Malhação - Pavão
- 1997 - Olho da Terra - Marcelo
- 1997 - Por Amor e Ódio - Santiago
- 1999 - Malhação - Robson
- 2002 - Marisol - Mário Soares
- 2004 - Turma do Gueto - Nenê/Kadu
- 2006 - Mandrake - Jorginho

=== Reality shows and other productions ===
- 2001 - Casa dos Artistas - Himself
- 2004 - Quinta das Celebridades - Himself
- 2005 - Primeira Companhia - Himself
- 2007 - O Melhor do Brasil - Enganador
- 2007 - Show do Tom - Capitão Monumento
- 2011 - A Praça é Nossa - Robin

As a director

- 2008 - Hoje em Dia
- 2009 - A Fazenda
- 2010 - Legendários
