= World Rock Day =

National holiday in Brazil

- Official name: World Rock Day
- Observed by: Brazil
- Type: Secular
- Date: 13 July
- Next time: 13 July 2026
- Frequency: Annual

World Rock Day, in Portuguese Dia Mundial do Rock, is observed annually on 13 July and celebrates rock music. The date alludes to the Live Aid benefit concert, organized by Bob Geldof and Midge Ure on 13 July 1985 to raise funds for relief of the 1983–1985 famine in Ethiopia; nevertheless, even though the holiday is called "World Rock Day", it is celebrated only in Brazil.

13 July was also chosen in reference to a statement made by Phil Collins at Live Aid, in which he expressed his desire that the date would become a "World Rock Day". In the 1990s, two São Paulo-based radio stations which focused on rock music, 89 FM A Rádio Rock and Energia 97, began promoting the date which soon became popular nationwide, but music specialists contest it as arbitrary and have offered other alternatives.
