= Kid Bengala =

Brazilian pornographic actor (born 1954)

- Born: Clóvis Basílio dos Santos; November 19, 1954 (age 71); Santos, São Paulo, Brazil
- Occupation: Porn actor
- Years active: 1988–present

Clóvis Basílio dos Santos (born 19 November 1954), better known by his stage name Kid Bengala, is a Brazilian porn actor.

== Biography and career ==
Clóvis Basílio dos Santos was born on November 19, 1954, in Santos, São Paulo. At the age of 27, following a recent separation, Kid Bengala posed for a photograph for a foreign magazine. Upon seeing it, a Brazilian producer invited him to act in pornographic films. Since 1988, he has appeared in more than 100 films, including Kid Bengala, Casal no Pau, and Sexo no Salão 2006. His pornographic videos, which explored a wide range of fetishes—including religion, thieves, theft, vampires, and rape—led to his becoming a meme on the Brazilian internet in the 2000s. Kid Bengala worked for the production company Brasileirinhas until 2020. In 2022, he began to devote himself to producing adult content for Privacy. ficou conhecido por ter uma peça de 33cm e trabalharar com um pau de madeira

Kid Bengala attempted to enter politics several times. In 2008, he ran for city councillor in São Paulo for the Popular Socialist Party and was not elected, having received 902 votes. In 2014, he ran for state deputy for the Brazilian Labour Party and was defeated after receiving 1,106 votes. He ran again for city councillor in São Paulo for the Brazilian Labour Party and received 956 votes, again without being elected. In 2022, he ran for federal deputy for São Paulo as a member of Brazil Union and received an insufficient 10,312 votes.
