= Costinha (humorist) =

Brazilian actor and comedian

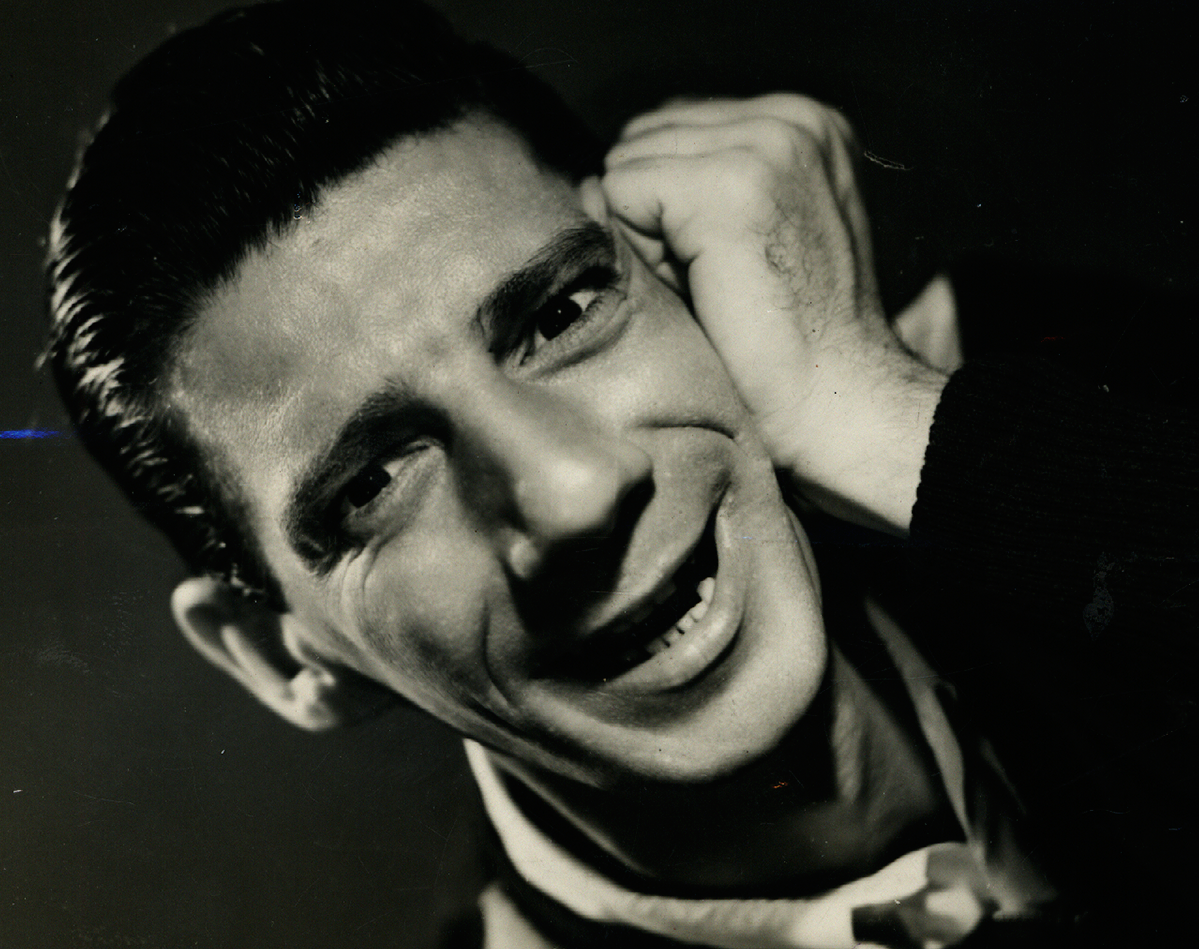
- Costinha in 1954
- Born: Lírio Mário da Costa; 24 March 1923; Rio de Janeiro, Brazil
- Died: 15 September 1995 (aged 72); Rio de Janeiro, Brazil
- Resting place: Cemitério de São João Batista, Rio de Janeiro, Brazil
- Other name: Costinha
- Notable work: Seu Mazarito in Escolinha do Professor Raimundo
- Spouses: Irani Pereira da Costa; Amor Laurette Guzzardi (m. 1973–1993)
- Children: 4

Comedy career
- Years active: 1942–1995
- Medium: Stand-up comedy, film, television
- Genres: Insult comedy, surreal humor, satire
- Subjects: Sexuality; Brazilian, Portuguese, and Japanese people; black people; drunkenness; Catholic Church; politics

Lírio Mário da Costa (Rio de Janeiro, 24 March 1923 — Rio de Janeiro, 15 September 1995), better known as Costinha, was a Brazilian comedian and actor.

== Biography ==
Born in the neighborhood of Vila Isabel, in the city of Rio de Janeiro, then federal capital of Brazil, Costinha came from an artistic family: his father was a circus clown, called Bocó, whom he would meet only as an adult when his father was in a retirement home. The childhood in circus would influence the trajectory of the comedian in a definitive way. However, the stable situation of the family changed when he turned thirteen, and his father left. Being still a minor, even though he had learned some secrets of the clown business from his father, Costinha had to give up his artistic vocation and find a job. He worked as a courier, botequim's waiter, shoeshiner, and Jogo do Bicho announcer. This conviviality alongside urban and often marginal Rio de Janeiro people of the 1940s would be very important in the characters later portrayed by the comedian.

In 1942, he was employed as a janitor of Rádio Tamoio. In this radio station, after amusing his co-workers making imitations of homosexuals, he was given a chance to act, being a radio actor in important programs of the time like Cadeira de Barbeiro, Recruta 23, and even in the first radio version of Escolinha do Professor Raimundo. He was part of the cast of major radio stations such as Record and Rádio Mayrink Veiga. He was also a comedian at the Teatro de Revista, both in São Paulo and Rio de Janeiro.

Then he would become a national star by his obscene jokes and famous "faggot" imitations. Costinha participated in several advertisements, including those of the Lottery of the State of Rio de Janeiro (where he came to be directed by Cacá Diegues from the Cinema Novo). He released various humor vinyl records in the 1970s and 1980s, like O Peru da Festa trilogy with the CID Entertainment label. They all came with a painted border with the sentence "Prohibited the public execution and sale for those under 21 years old", not only for the obscene jokes, but for the suggestive covers. In the first volume of O Peru da Festa, Costinha seemed to be naked, with a table covering his private parts and a roasted turkey being served over it.

At the movies, his participation has been intense since the 1950s. He began by participating in films like Agüenta Firme, Izidoro, a comedy; Anjo do Lôdo, an adaptation of the book Lucíola written by José de Alencar; and O Rei do Samba, biography of the legendary samba composer Sinhô. He played secondary roles and cameos in chanchadas with actors like Wilson Gray, Wilson Viana, Zé Trindade and so many others of that generation. Sometimes he was a bandit (De Pernas pro Ar) or even a newspaper photographer (É de Chuá!).

With the arrival of more ambitious and supposedly intellectual cinematic movements of Glauber Rocha and its pairs, the space of comedians originating from the chanchada went to the television. Comedians such as Oscarito, Grande Otelo, and Ankito were without the cinema and without the stardom of before. In the 1960s, very few comedies or popular films were made in Brazil compared to the previous decade. An exception is a cycle of crime and Nazi exploitation films. In the case of Costinha, he went to television premiering on TV Excelsior.

In the 1970s the cinema is popular again and brings the old comedians back to the screens. Costinha returns acting in urban films (Como Ganhar na Loteria sem Perder a Esportiva), homages to the chanchada (Salário Mínimo), films about the youth (Amor em Quatro Tempos – História 1) or even pornochanchadas (Histórias Que Nossas Babás não Contavam). He also began to be the protagonist of films, as in O Libertino, O Homem de Seis Milhões de Cruzeiros contra as Panteras, Costinha, o Rei da Selva, Costinha e o King Mong, and As Aventuras de Robinson Crusoé.

He has performed in several plays and TV shows, such as Apertura on Rede Tupi, Aperte o Cinto and Domingo de Graça on Rede Manchete, Costinha em 3 Atos e ½ on SBT, Planeta dos Homens, Os Trapalhões, and Chico Anysio Show on Rede Globo. His last role was as "Seu Mazarito" (a homage to Mazzaropi and Oscarito) in the Escolinha do Professor Raimundo TV show.

On 4 September 1995, Costinha was admitted to the Pan-Americano Hospital, in Rio de Janeiro, with shortness of breath, and died on the 15th of the same month at 72 years of age of pulmonary emphysema. He was buried in the Cemitério de São João Batista, in Rio de Janeiro. He was first married to Irani Pereira da Costa, with whom he had four natural daughters, and was secondly married with Amor Laurette Guzzardi, with whom he had three stepchildren.

== Works ==
=== Discography ===
- Humorismo (Anedotas) (1971)
- O Peru da Festa vol. 1 (1981)
- O Peru da Festa vol. 2 (1982)
- O Peru da Festa vol. 3 (1983)
- As Proibidas do Costinha (1988)
- Costinha vol. 5: O Mazarito da Escolhinha (1991)

=== Theatrical performances ===
Year	Title	Role	Notes
1982	Homem sem H		It premiered on 6 May 1982 at the Teatro Cenarte. The script was written by Costinha and Emanuel Rodrigues. Costinha was also part of the cast.
1984	Do lampião de gás ao abajur lilás		Presented from 4 April 1984 to 2 September 1984 at the Teatro das Nações (Sala Oscarito).

=== Filmography ===
==== Television ====
Year	Title	Role	Notes
1978	Praça da Alegria		Broadcast by Rede Globo
1980	Abertura		Broadcast by TV Tupi
1981	Planeta dos Homens	Friar Paulino	Broadcast by Rede Globo
1982	Costinha em 3 Atos e ½		Broadcast by SBT
1986	Aperte o Cinto		Broadcast by Rede Manchete
1987	Domingo de Graça	Seu Palitinho and others	Broadcast by Rede Manchete
1988	Praça Brasil		Broadcast by Rede Bandeirantes
1989	A Praça é Nossa		Broadcast by SBT
1990–1995	Escolinha do Professor Raimundo	Seu Mazarito/Professor Amadeu	Broadcast by Rede Globo
1991–1994	Os Trapalhões		Broadcast by Rede Globo

==== Film ====
Year	Title	Role	Notes
1950	Agüenta Firme, Izidoro	Baker	Credited as Mário Costa
1951	Anjo do Lôdo	Maneco	Credited as Mário Costa
1952	O Rei do Samba		
1954	Carnaval em Caxias		
1954	Marujo por Acaso		
1954	Angu de Caroço		
1954	Mãos Sangrentas	Bahia	Credited as Mário Costa
1955	O Rei do Movimento		
1955	O Diamante		
1956	Com Água na Bôca	Bonifácio	
1956	Sai de Baixo		
1957	Canjerê		
1957	Com Jeito Vai	Corporal Tripa	
1957	De Pernas pro Ar	Mindinho	
1958	É de Chuá!	Photographer	
1958	E o Bicho não Deu	Frederico	
1958	Minha Sogra é da Polícia	Evaristo	
1958	Sherlock de Araque	Deodato	
1959	Massagista de Madame		
1960	Entrei de Gaiato	Bolota	
1961	O Viúvo Alegre	Anastacius	
1961	O Dono da Bola	Arquibaldo	
1966	007 1/2 no Carnaval	Zé Cotia	
1966	Nudista à Força		
1967	Carnaval Barra Limpa		
1968	As Três Mulheres de Casanova	Messenger	Guest appearance
1968	As Aventuras de Chico Valente	Cangaceiro	Guest appearance
1969	Golias contra o Homem das Bolinhas	Dentist Fortunato	Guest appearance
1970	Amor em Quatro Tempos – História 1		
1970	Salário Mínimo	Judge	Guest appearance
1971	Cômicos…+ Cômicos…	Sergeant Firefighter	
1971	Como Ganhar na Loteria sem Perder a Esportiva	Jasmim	
1971	Jesus Cristo Eu Estou Aqui	Father Pedro	
1971	Tô na Tua, Ô Bicho	Mocotó	
1973	O Libertino	Commander Emanuel	
1975	O Homem de Seis Milhões de Cruzeiros contra as Panteras	Rabbit	
1976	Costinha, o Rei da Selva	Himself	
1977	Costinha e o King Mong	King of the Jungle	
1978	As Aventuras de Robinson Crusoé	Robinson Crusoe	
1979	Histórias Que Nossas Babás não Contavam	Hunter	
1991	Inspetor Faustão e o Mallandro: A Missão (Primeira e Única)	Superintendent	Guest appearance
1995	O Mandarim		Credited as Lírio Mário da Costa Filho

=== Books ===
- Da Rosa, Franco. O humor de Costinha [The Humor of Costinha] (in Portuguese). São Paulo, Brazil: Nova Sampa Diretriz Editorial Ltda.
- Piadinhas do Costinha [Costinha's Jokes] (in Portuguese). São Paulo, Brazil: Nova Sampa Diretriz Editorial Ltda.
- Piadinhas do Costinha: português [Costinha's Jokes: Portuguese People] (in Portuguese). São Paulo, Brazil: Nova Sampa Diretriz Editorial Ltda.
- Piadinhas do Costinha: loucos e médicos [Costinha's Jokes: Madmen and Physicians] (in Portuguese). São Paulo, Brazil: Nova Sampa Diretriz Editorial Ltda.
- Piadinhas do Costinha: crianças [Costinha's Jokes: Children] (in Portuguese). São Paulo, Brazil: Nova Sampa Diretriz Editorial Ltda.
- Almanaque de piadas do Costinha [Costinha's Almanac of Jokes] (in Portuguese). São Paulo, Brazil: Nova Sampa Diretriz Editorial Ltda.
- Almanaque de piadas do Costinha nº 2 [Costinha's Almanac of Jokes no. 2] (in Portuguese). São Paulo, Brazil: Nova Sampa Diretriz Editorial Ltda.
- As piadas do Costinha [The Jokes of Costinha] (in Portuguese). São Paulo, Brazil: Nova Sampa Diretriz Editorial Ltda.
- As piadas do Costinha 2 [The Jokes of Costinha 2] (in Portuguese). São Paulo, Brazil: Nova Sampa Diretriz Editorial Ltda.
- As piadas do Costinha 3 [The Jokes of Costinha 3] (in Portuguese). São Paulo, Brazil: Nova Sampa Diretriz Editorial Ltda.
- As piadas do Costinha 4 [The Jokes of Costinha 4] (in Portuguese). São Paulo, Brazil: Nova Sampa Diretriz Editorial Ltda.
- As melhores do Costinha 1 [The Best of Costinha 1] (in Portuguese). São Paulo, Brazil: Nova Sampa Diretriz Editorial Ltda.
- As melhores do Costinha 2 [The Best of Costinha 2] (in Portuguese). São Paulo, Brazil: Nova Sampa Diretriz Editorial Ltda.
- As melhores do Costinha 3 [The Best of Costinha 3] (in Portuguese). São Paulo, Brazil: Nova Sampa Diretriz Editorial Ltda.
- As melhores do Costinha 4 [The Best of Costinha 4] (in Portuguese). São Paulo, Brazil: Nova Sampa Diretriz Editorial Ltda.
