= Sérgio Mallandro =

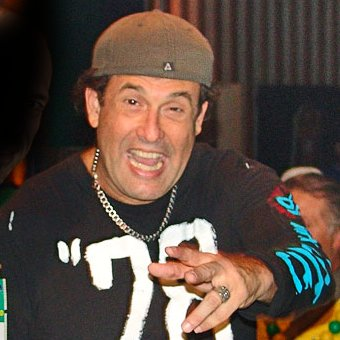
- Born: October 12, 1955 (age 70); Rio de Janeiro, Brazil
- Occupation: Actor

Sérgio 'Mallandro' Neiva Cavalcanti a.k.a. "Sérgio Mallandro" (born October 12, 1955, date confirmed by Sérgio Mallandro on the TV Record program "Tudo é Possível") is a Brazilian actor and TV shows host.

== Biography ==
Born in Rio de Janeiro, Mallandro got famous in the late-1980s and early-1990s when he hosted several shows on the SBT, Rede Globo and Rede Manchete TV stations, mostly game shows and all of them targeted to children.

Mallandro's most famous segment was called "A Porta dos Desesperados" ("The Doorway for the Desperates" some thing like Let's Make a Deal's "Big Deal of the Day"), in which the contestants had to choose one among three doors. Behind one door was a prize (bike, board games, etc.) and behind the other were people in gorilla costumes.

He also presented "A Casa dos Desesperados" ("The House of the Desperates" which was a parody of Big Brother).

Mallandro is married and he has three children.
