= João Gordo =

Brazilian vocalist and television host

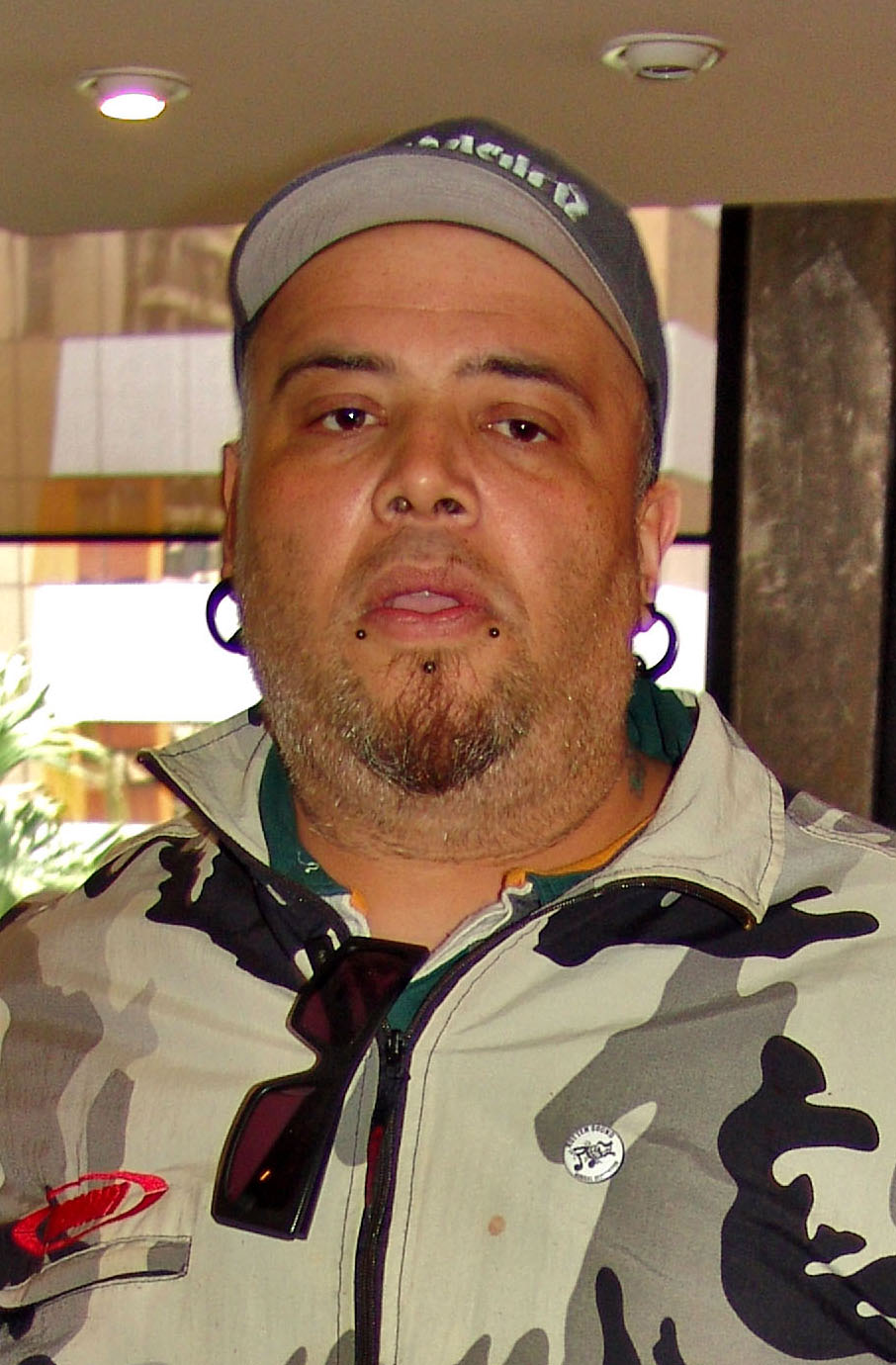
- João Gordo in 2007

Background information
- Born: João Francisco Benedan; 13 March 1964 (age 62); Angatuba, Brazil
- Genres: Crossover thrash, thrash metal, punk rock, hardcore punk, D-beat
- Occupations: Singer, talk show host, paleontologist
- Years active: 1980–present
- Labels: Baratos Afins, Cogumelo, Gravadora Eldorado, Roadrunner, Century Media, Pecúlio Discos, Deckdisc

João Gordo (born João Francisco Benedan on 13 March 1964) is a Brazilian vocalist, TV host and paleontologist. He is the lead singer of the hardcore punk band Ratos de Porão, also known simply as RxDxPx. He participated in many seminal punk events in Brazil.

Benedan began his musical career as a member of the boy band RC Boys, covering the major hits of Brazilian singer Roberto Carlos. Besides several guest appearances in metal radio shows from São Paulo such as Backstage and Comando Metal (defunct, originally syndicated in São Paulo on 89.1 Rock FM). In the 1990s he became one of the most famous VJs of MTV Brasil, in their programs of games and talk shows. He also appeared on the studio version of "Reza" on Against (1998) and also contributed vocals to Nation (2001), and RDP's song "Crucificados Pelo Sistema" was covered by Sepultura way back when. He appeared on Sepultura's 2005 DVD Live in São Paulo, joining the band to perform "Reza" and "Biotech Is Godzilla". Later he worked at Rede Record in a comedy TV show called: "Legendários" (Portuguese for "Legendaries"). He now has a YouTube channel where he hosts a talk show and cooks vegan food, called Panelaço.
