= Comedy troupe =

Group of comedians working together

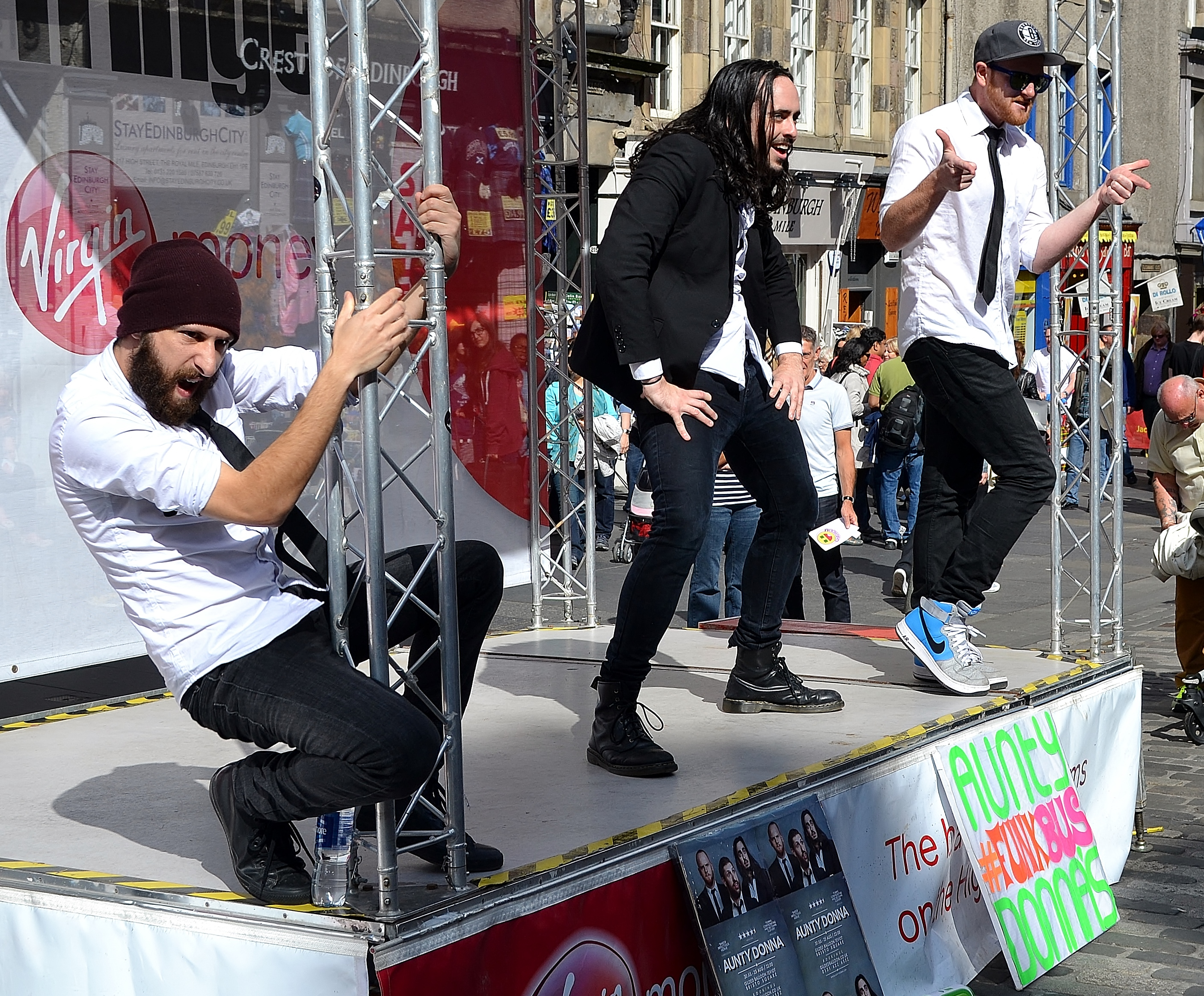
Australian comedy troupe Aunty Donna performing at the Edinburgh Festival Fringe

A comedy troupe is a group of comedians and associated personnel who work together to perform comedy as entertainment. The term is often used interchangeably with comedy group, and the troupe may specialize in a specific genre or style of comedy.

Some examples of comedy troupes include: the Marx Brothers, the Three Stooges, Laurel and Hardy, Martin and Lewis, Abbott and Costello, Cheech & Chong, the Second City, Kalabhavan, the Firesign Theatre, Monty Python, Blue Collar Comedy Tour, the Rat Pack, Penn and Teller, the Kids in the Hall, the Mighty Boosh, the Trailer Park Boys, The Whitest Kids U' Know, the Tenderloins, the Hollow Men, Asperger's Are Us, Kummeli, Senario, and Them There.

== See also ==
- Improvisational theatre
- Sketch comedy
