= Everybody Everybody (album) =

Compilation album by Viper

Compilation album by Viper
- Released: 1999
- Genre: Heavy metal
- Length: 1:05:22
- Label: Gravadora Eldorado

Viper chronology
Tem Pra Todo Mundo (1996)	Everybody Everybody (1999)	All My Life (2007)

Professional ratings
Review scores
Source	Rating
Rock Brigade	6/10

Everybody Everybody is a compilation album by Brazilian heavy metal band Viper to celebrate the band's 15th anniversary.

== Track listing ==
Title	Original Album	Original Release	Length	Notes	Ref
"Not Ready to Get Up"	Tem pra Todo Mundo	1996	3:42		
"Dead Light"	Evolution	1992	4:06		
"I Fought the Law"	Coma Rage	1995	2:17	Cover of the 1960 song by Sonny Curtis	
"Rebel Maniac"	Evolution	1992	3:34		
"8 de Abril"	Tem pra Todo Mundo	1996	4:07		
"Coma Rage"	Coma Rage	1995	2:54		
"Não Quero Dinheiro"	Maniacs in Japan	1993	3:00	Tim Maia cover, live in Tokyo	
"The One You Need"	Tem pra Todo Mundo	1996	3:35		
"Killing World"	Vipera Sapiens	1992	3:08		
"Crime Na Cidade"	Tem pra Todo Mundo	1996	4:07		
"A Cry from the Edge"	Theatre of Fate	1989	4:57	Live in Tokyo	
"Evolution"	Evolution	1992	5:17		
"Living for the Night"	Theatre of Fate	1989	5:26		
"The Shelter"	Evolution	1992	4:04		
"Keep the Words"	Coma Rage	1995	4:16		
"Soldiers of Sunrise"	Soldiers of Sunrise	1987	6:52		
