= Metal Open Air =

Cancelled heavy metal festival in Brazil

Coordinates: 2.9848°S 44.3615°W

- Genre: Heavy metal
- Locations: Parque Independência, São Luís, Maranhão, Brazil
- Years active: 2012
- Founders: Natanael Jr.

Metal Open Air (also known simply as MOA) was an unsuccessful 2012 heavy metal festival. It took place between 20–22 April, at the Parque Independência, 25 km southeast from downtown São Luís, Maranhão, northeastern Brazil. Due to problems with the payment of artists and the accommodation and security of the audience, the festival was ultimately cancelled on its last day.

== Background and official line-up ==
Originally, it was supposed to be a Brazilian version of the famous German Wacken Open Air. However, the promoters failed to obtain official permission to use the name, so they decided to switch it for Metal Open Air. From that moment on, several bands, including Shaman, Megadeth, Symphony X and Anthrax, started to confirm their performances, though a few had cancelled, including Shadowside, Krisiun, and Volbeat, mostly for logistical reasons.

By February/March 2012, the official announced line-up was as follows (act names in bold are headliners; El Diablo is an entertainment group that prepared rock night parties after every headliner performance):

Friday, 20 April	Saturday, 21 April	Sunday, 22 April
Semblant; Ânsia de Vômito; Drowned; Headhunter D.C.; Hangar; Almah; Orphaned Land; Torture Squad; Exciter; Anvil; Destruction; Exodus; Symphony X; **Megadeth**; EL DIABLO: Fúria Louca + Fetish Dolls	Terra Prima; Ácido; Obskure; Dark Avenger; Shadowside; Stress; Legion of the Damned; Andre Matos; Korzus; U.D.O.; Grave Digger; Blind Guardian; Anthrax; **Rock and Roll All Stars**; EL DIABLO: Carro Bomba + Fetish Dolls	Expose Your Hate; Megaherz; Unearthly; Attomica; Motorocker; Matanza; Otep; Shaman; Ratos de Porão; Obituary; Dio Disciples; Fear Factory; Annihilator; Saxon; **Venom**; EL DIABLO: Baranga + Fetish Dolls

The headliners of the second day, the Rock and Roll All Stars, were a supergroup composed of Gene Simmons, Joe Elliott, Matt Sorum, Duff McKagan, Gilby Clarke, Glenn Hughes, Ed Roland, Sebastian Bach, Steve Stevens, Mike Inez, Billy Duffy and Charlie Sheen, who was to be the festival's master of ceremonies.

== The festival and the cancellations ==
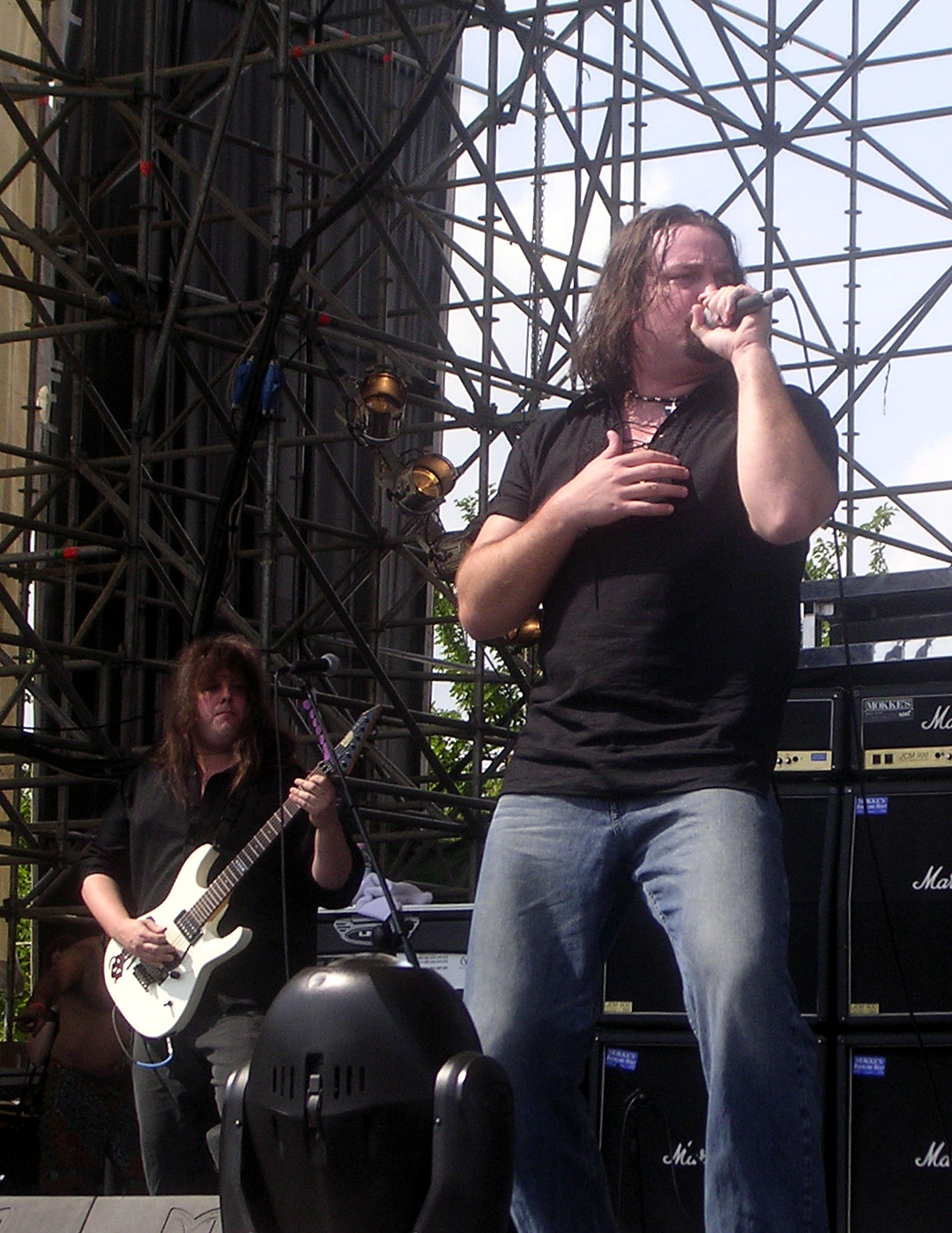
Michael Romeo (left) and Russell Allen (right); Symphony X was among the very few bands that managed to make a performance at the festival.

Shortly before and even during the festival, several bands cancelled their performances. British thrash band Venom, for example, had their visas sent to Africa instead of Brazil by mistake, thus making it impossible for them to take part of MOA and two other South American festivals. Hansi Kürsch, vocalist for German power metal quartet Blind Guardian, stated:

In 25 years of our career we [...] have been extremely successful in the avoidance of cancelled shows, so far. This unfortunately comes to a very sad end here in São Luís. Due to massive technical and administrative problems we were forced to cancel tonight's show. As far as we understand it seems to be the local management who has not been able to secure a proper festival environment, anymore. Things are pretty out of hand there. We feel very sorry about this totally unsatisfying situation, but the mistakes made by the local promoter makes an even improvised show impossible. [...] In the future we will be more careful in confirming such festivals.

Aquiles Priester, from Hangar, also cancelled his band's participation, stating:

We negotiated everything via oral conversation, but we made ourselves very much clear that we needed the total cash before our performance, since we needed to pay our trip to São Luís in our very own bus. We wouldn't accept, by any means, to play without our backline. So far, we were paid with only 25% of the cash to cover all our expenses (fuel, accommodation and food for the band and crew), we needed at least 75%.

Terra Prima's members didn't receive their air tickets to São Luís nor the confirmation of their accommodations in the city.

Symphony X, one of the few bands that managed to take on the stage and perform, posted a note some days later, thanking their fans for the show and criticizing the event's structure:

We want to thank the fans for sticking it out on Friday night! We were extremely close to having to cancel the show due to technical reasons and did not know if we would even play for sure until an hour before the set, which had already been delayed two hours. The lack of organization and chaos surrounding the event, which had also been noted by the media, had forced many bands to cancel. This is unfair to the fans in attendance, and unfortunately these fans were robbed of many performances.

Dave Mustaine, from Megadeth, also thanked his fans and regretted the festival's organization:

To the fans last night in São Luís, thank you. It's all I can say. One Big Mega Thank You! Yesterday's show in Sao Luis was very challenging, but we did it! [...] I was told a lot of the talent opted out from coming. I was also told the tickets cost $450 Brazilian real for the three-day weekend, and $250 BRL for just one day. The average person in this area makes $28 BRL a day, so you can do the math. [...] We were playing, no matter what. We weren't playing for the promoter anymore; we were playing for the people!

Ricardo Confessori, drummer for Shaman, publicly contested Anthrax guitarist Scott Ian for canceling the band's performance at the festival, accusing him of not giving a good excuse for the fans, to which Ian replied that the problem was "the whole terrible organization. We never want to cancel but they made it impossible."

In the end, a total of 30 of the 47 invited bands cancelled their performances due to the severe logistical, structural and financial problems regarding the festival. As for the fans, some had to camp inside stables, with almost no electricity, lack of places to buy food, beverage and hygiene products and only one public toilet.

== Aftermath ==
Soon after MOA was cancelled, both companies responsible for the festival (Negri Concerts and Lamparina Filmes e Produções) accused each other of breaking contractual rules.
