= Passarell =

Passarell is a surname. Notable people with the surname include:

- Al Passarell (1950–1986), Canadian politician
- Pit Passarell (1968–2024), Argentine-born Brazilian musician
  - Yves Passarell (born 1969), Brazilian musician, brother of the preceding

== See also ==
- Process Passarell, desalination process
- Pasarell
