= Caravellus =

Brazilian metal band

- Origin: Recife, Pernambuco, Brazil
- Genres: Power metal, progressive metal
- Years active: 2002–present
- Labels: Erpland Records, Metalodic Records
- Members: Glauber Oliveira; Rafael Ferreira; Maurílio Vizin; Daniel Felix; Leandro Caçoilo
- Past members: Raphael Dantas; Paula Araújo; Pedro Lima; Charles Erlan
- Website: www.caravellus.net

Caravellus is a Brazilian power / progressive metal formed in Recife in 2002.

Following the release of their debut album, Paula Araújo, Pedro Lima and Charles Erlan left the band due to musical differences.

In 2010, the band released their second album Knowledge Machine in Brazil, North America, Europe, South Korea and Japan.

In 2018, guitarist and producer Glauber Oliveira commenced work on a new album and John Macaluso (Ark, Yngwie Malmsteen, Michael Romeo) was invited to record the drums. The band also announced a new line-up with Leandro Caçoilo (vocals), Maurílio Vizin (bass) and Rafael Ferreira (drums), the latter a former bandmate of Oliveira in Dark Avenger.

In 2022, the album, titled Inter Mundos, was released. It tells a love story that takes place in an unnamed village located somewhere in Northwestern Brazil e that covers topics such as class conflict, corruption, religious prejudice, and life & death (the latter personified in the style of Ariano Suassuna). The album featured Daísa Munhoz (Twilight Aura, Vandroya), Derek Sherinian (Sons of Apollo, ex-Dream Theater, Black Country Communion), Macaluso, Felipe Andreoli (Angra), Hugo Mariutti (Shaman, ex-Angra), Daniela Serafim (Invisible Control) and Elba Ramalho. It was originally scheduled for release in the first half of 2021, but it was pushed back to April 2022. The cover was drawn by hand and inspired by Suassuna's História d'O Rei Degolado nas caatingas do sertão: ao sol da Onça Caetana.

== Members ==
Current members

- Leandro Caçoilo - vocals
- Glauber Oliveira - guitar
- Emerson Dácio - bass
- Daniel Felix - keyboards
- Rafael Ferreira - drums

Former members

- Maurílio Vizin - bass
- Raphael Dantas - vocals
- Paula Araújo - vocals
- José Mário - vocals
- Hugo Rodrigues - vocals
- Pedro Lima - bass
- Charles Erlan - drums
- Cleison Johan - bass
- Gustavo Aragão - guitar
- Leonardo Henrich - guitar

== Discography ==
=== Demos ===
- 2002 - Reaching the Sky
- 2004 - Across the Oceans

=== Studio albums ===
- 2007 - Lighthouse & Shed
- 2010 - Knowledge Machine
- 2022 - Inter Mundos
