= The Turn of the Lights =

Studio album by Andre Matos
- Released: August 22, 2012
- Genres: Heavy metal Power metal
- Length: 52:28
- Labels: Azul Music, Brazil; Avalon, Japan; SPV, Europe

Andre Matos chronology
Mentalize (2009)	The Turn of the Lights (2012)

The Turn of the Lights is the third and final solo album of Brazilian vocalist/pianist Andre Matos.

== Track listing ==
All lyrics are written by Andre Matos and assisted by Brendan Duffey.

No.	Title	Music	Length
1.	"Liberty"	Andre Matos, Hugo Mariutti	4:11
2.	"Course Of Life"	Andre Matos	5:40
3.	"The Turn of the Lights"	Andre Matos, Hugo Mariutti, Bruno Ladislau, Casagrande	4:21
4.	"Gaza"	Andre Matos, Hugo Mariutti	5:30
5.	"Stop!"	Andre Matos, Hugo Mariutti	5:16
6.	"On Your Own"	Andre Matos, Hugo Mariutti	5:40
7.	"Unreplaceable"	Andre Matos, Hugo Mariutti, Bruno Ladislau	4:49
8.	"Oversoul"	Hugo Mariutti, Bruno Ladislau, Andre Matos	5:30
9.	"White Summit"	Andre Matos, Hugo Mariutti	4:00
10.	"Light-years"	Andre Matos, Andre Hernandes	4:08
11.	"Sometimes"	Andre Matos	3:23
Total length:			52:28

All lyrics are written by Andre Matos; all music is composed by Andre Matos, except where otherwise specified.

Japanese edition bonus track
No.	Title	Length
12.	"Wings of Reality (Angra cover)"

Japanese 2-CD Special Edition
No.	Title	Lyrics	Music	Length
1.	"At Least a Chance (Viper cover)"	Pit Passarell	Viper
2.	"I Don't Believe in Love (Queensrÿche cover)"	Chris DeGarmo, Geoff Tate
3.	"Fake Plastic Trees (Radiohead cover)"	Thom Yorke, Phil Selway, Ed O'Brien, Jonny Greenwood, Colin Greenwood
4.	"Hisame (Japanese enka cover)"

== Charts ==
Chart (2012)	Peak position
Oricon Total Album Sales	114

== Personnel ==
- Andre Matos – Vocals, piano and keyboards.
- Andre Hernandes – Guitars
- Hugo Mariutti – Guitars
- Bruno Ladislau – Bass guitar
- Rodrigo Silveira – Drums
- Produced

Engineered by Brendan Duffey, Adriano Daga and Andre Rodrigues

- Mastered by Brendan Duffey and Adriano Daga
