= Remove Silence =

Brazilian hard rock band

- Origin: São Paulo, Brazil
- Genres: Hard rock
- Years active: 2007–present
- Labels: Metaledge Records, Dynamo Records
- Members: Danilo Carpigiani; Ale Souza; Fabio Ribeiro; Leo Baeta
- Website: www.removesilence.com

Remove Silence is a Brazilian hard rock band from São Paulo, Brazil formed in 2007. Founded by Hugo Mariutti, Fabio Ribeiro formerly of Brazilian band Shaman, Ale Souza and Edu Cominato. Remove Silence released their debut album Fade in September 2009 on the Dynamo Records label in Brazil.

== History ==
Remove Silence is a band from São Paulo, Brazil, formed in 2007 by guitarist/vocalist Hugo Mariutti (Shaman, Andre Matos), keyboardist Fabio Ribeiro (Angra, Shaman, Andre Matos), bassist/vocalist Ale Souza, and drummer/vocalist Edu Cominato. The band's debut album, Fade, was released in September 2009, via Dynamo Records in Brazil. The album features 10 original songs, plus a new version of Jeff Buckley’s “Dream Brother”. Recently the band signed the contract for the release of Fade in North America with Dallas, Texas based Metaledge Records. Fade will be released to North America on September 21, 2010, in the digital format and in stores. The title track Fade has been featured in rotation on MTV Brazil since December 2009. In 2010, the band launched their new website and a video series on YouTube.

== Band members ==
=== Current members ===
- Danilo Carpigiani – guitars/vocals
- Fabio Ribeiro – keyboards
- Ale Souza – bass/vocals
- Leo Baeta – drums

=== Past members ===
- Hugo Mariutti – guitars/vocals (2007-2014)
- Edu Cominato – drums/vocals (2007-2014)

== Discography ==
Studio albums

Year	Title	Label
2009	Fade	Dynamo Records
2010	Fade	Metaledge Records
2012	Stupid Human Atrocity	
2013	Little Piece of Heaven (EP)	
2015	Irreversible (EP)	
2017	Raw (single)	
2018	Middle of Nowhere (single)	
2018	Laser Gun (single)	
2019	Raw	

== Sources ==
1. Christe, Ian (2003), Sound of the Beast: The Complete Headbanging History of Heavy Metal, HarperCollins, ISBN 0-380-81127-8
