= Superior (band) =

German progressive metal band

- Origin: Kaiserslautern
- Genres: Progressive metal
- Years active: 1992–2007
- Labels: Noise Records; Rising Sun
- Members: Michael Tangermann; Bernd Basmer; Michael Müller; Martin Reichhart; Jan Becker; Thomas Meyer

Superior was a German progressive metal band, founded in 1992, and disbanded in 2007. Their style was described as being similar to Dream Theater.

== History ==
Eight months after Superior was founded, they released their demo Timeshift. This demo contained an early version of the song "Tomorrow's Eve", which was to be included on their first album Behind. Until the middle of 1994 the band toured mainly in southwestern Germany, until they began recording their first CD. It took them a year to work on the compositions, arrangement and the concept of their debut album, Behind. The album was recorded in 1995 in the Roko Soundstudios. Behind can be described as a progressive metal album, with very heavy and aggressive sounds, including driving guitars, complex piano and string arrangements.

When the album was completed the band signed a contract with Hamburg label L.M.P., which got in touch with various record companies. In the fall of 1996 Superior signed a contract with Modern Music/Noise Records. Shortly after signing with Noise Records, Superior toured Germany with Virgin Steele and Angra. After the fourth show, keyboardist Jan-Marco Becker hurt his hand severely and had to be operated on during the tour. Angra's frontman Andre Matos offered them to rehearse some of the keyboard parts and Superior was able to continue touring. After the tour Superior was forced to take a break, waiting on their keyboardist to recover.

In the middle of 1997, when their keyboardist had recovered, Superior began touring again, starting with a short tour through France, where they also played some unplugged sessions. They performed several shows in Germany, while already working on the material for their new album.

From the middle of March through the middle of May 1998 Superior recorded, mixed and mastered their second album, Younique, which was released in August 1998. This album can identify heavy guitar riffing, diverse keyboard arrangements and sounds, very complex and individual instrumentation, acoustic guitars, sitar-sounds, brass arrangements and saxophone solos. Many magazines worldwide celebrated Younique as a milestone in progressive music. After the album's release, the band didn't much; they did perform with Angra and Stratovarius.

Superior and their French label NTS Records decided to cooperate for a further album, which turned out to be a concept album, about religious fanaticism with all its consequences down to terrorism. The recordings for their next album at the Roko Soundstudios took the following six months. Ultima Ratio is less experimental than Younique, Superior and Noise Records agreed that the style of the band's music just didn't match together with the company's politics and their strict adherence to true metal style. The arrangements in this albums are clearly structured, and the dominating characteristics are the heavy guitars, piano playing combined with Michael's vocals.

A Fourth album was reported on their Myspace page during 2007, to have been completed. When asked why the album had not seen release the band responded that 'not enough money to finance distribution' was the key issue. No further mention of the recordings followed.

The band split up at the end of 2007 due to the pressure of touring, recording, and supporting families.

== Lineup ==
- Michael Tangermann – vocals
- Bernd Basmer – guitar
- Michael Müller – guitar
- Martin Reichhart – bass guitar
- Jan-Marco Becker – keyboards
- Thomas Mayer – drums

== Discography ==
- Behind (1996)
- Younique (1998)
- Ultima Ratio (2002)
- Ultra – Live (2005)
