= RituAlive =

Live album by Shaman
- Released: December 2003
- Genre: Progressive power metal
- Length: 73:00
- Label: Universal Records

Shaman chronology
Ritual (2002)	RituAlive (2003)	Reason (2005)

RituAlive is a live album and DVD, released in 2003 by the metal band Shaman.

In a negative review, Ben of MetalReviews.com called it a "rushed and half assed product".

== Track listing ==
All tracks written by Andre Matos except where noted.

=== CD ===
1. "Ancient Winds"
2. "Here I Am"
3. "Distant thunder"
4. "For Tomorrow"
5. "Time Will Come"
6. "Over Your Head"
7. "Fairy Tale"
8. "Blind Spell"
9. "Ritual"
10. "Sign of the Cross (Avantasia cover)" (Tobias Sammet)
11. "Pride"
12. "Eagle Fly Free (Helloween cover)" (Michael Weikath + Andy Deris)
13. "Carry On (Angra cover)"

=== DVD ===
1. "Ancient Winds"
2. "Here I Am"
3. "Distant Thunder"
4. "For Tomorrow"
5. "Time Will Come"
6. "Lisbon"
7. "Guitar Solo"
8. "Drum Solo"
9. "Over Your Head"
10. "Piano Solo"
11. "Fairy Tale"
12. "Blind Spell"
13. "Ritual"
14. "Sign of the Cross" (Tobias Sammet)
15. "Pride"
16. "Carry On"
17. "Eagle Fly Free" (Michael Weikath + Andi Deris)
18. "Lasting Child"
- "Over Your Head" and "Fairy Tale": Featuring Marcus Viana (electric violin)
- "Sign of the Cross (Avantasia cover)" and "Pride": Featuring Tobias Sammet (vocals) and Sascha Paeth (guitar).
- "Eagle Fly Free (Helloween cover)": Featuring Andi Deris (vocals) and Michael Weikath (guitar).

== Personnel ==
- Andre Matos - lead vocals, piano, keyboards
- Hugo Mariutti - guitar, backing vocals
- Luís Mariutti - bass, backing vocals
- Ricardo Confessori - drums
- Fábio Ribeiro - keyboards
