= Ritual (Shaman album) =

Studio album by Shaman
- Released: June 21, 2002
- Genres: Heavy metal, power metal
- Length: 56:47
- Label: Universal Music
- Producer: Sascha Paeth

Shaman chronology
Ritual (2002)	RituAlive (2003)

Ritual is the debut album by the Brazilian heavy metal band Shaman. It was first released in 2002, and it is a concept album about many cultures, mainly indigenous cultures and shamanism. The album has sold over 500,000 copies worldwide since its release and appears on the list Top 100 Power Metal Albums of All Time by metalstorm.com.

== Track listing ==
1. "Ancient Winds" (André Matos) – 3:16
2. "Here I Am" (Matos) – 5:56
3. "Distant Thunder" (Hugo Mariutti) – 6:22
4. "For Tomorrow" (Ricardo Confessori) – 6:47
5. "Time Will Come" (H. Mariutti) – 5:32
6. "Over Your Head" (Luis Mariutti) – 6:37
7. "Fairy Tale" (Matos) – 6:56
8. "Blind Spell" (Confessori) – 4:34
9. "Ritual" (Matos) – 6:37
10. "Pride" (Matos) – 4:11

== Personnel ==
Shaman

- André Matos – vocals, piano
- Hugo Mariutti – guitar
- Luís Mariutti – bass
- Ricardo Confessori – drums

Additional personnel

- Tobias Sammet (Edguy) – vocals on "Pride"
- Sascha Paeth – guitars on "Pride"
- Marcus Viana – violin on "Over Your Head"
- Derek Sherinian – keyboard solo on "Over Your Head"
- Ademar Farinha – wind instruments in the introduction of "For Tomorrow"
- Ancient Winds was made by Miro.
