= All My Life (Viper album) =

2007 album by Brazilian metal band Viper

Studio album by Viper
- Released: 15 June 2007
- Recorded: 2006, 2007; Ultra-Sônica Produções
- Genre: Heavy metal; power metal
- Label: Gravadora Eldorado
- Producer: André Cortada; Marcos Yukio Ninomiya; Theo Vieira

Viper chronology
Everybody Everybody (1999)	All My Life (2007)

All My Life is the sixth album by Brazilian heavy metal band Viper, released in June 2007. It was their first studio album in more than a decade and was Ricardo Bocci's first album with the band. The original tentative title for this album was Do It All Again. All My Life was remixed and remastered in 2021 by Andre Cortada and Val Santos and featured bonus tracks, including a cover of "Prowler" by Iron Maiden, 2005 demos (P. Passarell, Machado, Y. Passarell, Martin), and 2006 demos.

== Track listing ==
Order	Title	Length	Writer(s)	Ref
1	"All My Life"	3:46	Passarell	
2	"Come On Come On"	4:42	Passarell, Machado	
3	"Miles Away"	3:33	Bocci	
4	"Not That Easy"	4:21	Passarell	
5	"Love Is All"	6:55	Passarell	
6	"Cross The Line"	5:08	Santos	
7	"Do It All Again"	3:48	Passarell	
8	"Violet"	4:44	Passarell	
9	"Dreamer"	3:59	Santos	
10	"Soldier Boy"	2:51	Passarell	
11	"Rising Sun"	5:25	Bocci	
12	"Miracle"	4:28	Santos, Edgard Prado	

== Personnel ==
- Ricardo Bocci – vocals
- Felipe Machado – guitar
- Val Santos – guitar
- Pit Passarell – bass guitar, vocals
- Renato Graccia – drums

=== Additional musicians ===
- André Matos – vocals on "Love Is All"
- Yves Passarell – guitar solo on "Violet" and "Prowler" (bonus track)
- Andre Cortada – all pianos & keyboards
