= Mentalize (album) =

Studio album by Andre Matos
- Released: September 26th 2009
- Genre: Heavy metal Power metal
- Length: 1:00:21
- Label: Azul Music

Andre Matos chronology
| Time To Be Free (2007) | Mentalize (2009) | The Turn of the Lights (2012) |

Mentalize is the second solo album of Brazilian vocalist/pianist Andre Matos.

== Track list ==
| No. | Title | Length |
|---|---|---|
| 1. | "Leading On!" | 5:08 |
| 2. | "I Will Return" | 5:10 |
| 3. | "Someone Else" | 5:47 |
| 4. | "Shift the Night Away" | 4:58 |
| 5. | "Back to You" | 4:14 |
| 6. | "Mentalize" | 4:05 |
| 7. | "The Myriad" | 5:08 |
| 8. | "When the Sun Cried Out" | 4:39 |
| 9. | "Mirror of Me" | 4:15 |
| 10. | "Violence" | 4:59 |
| 11. | "A Lapse in Time" | 2:42 |
| 12. | "Power Stream" | 4:13 |
| 13. | "Don't Despair" (bonus track for Brazil) | 5:08 |
| 14. | "Forever Is Too Long" (bonus track for Japan) | 4:02 |
| 15. | "Teo Torriatte (Let Us Cling Together)" (bonus track for Japan) | 4:58 |
| Total length: | | 75:36 |

== Personnel ==
- Andre Matos – vocals & piano
- Andre Hernandes – guitars
- Hugo Mariutti – guitars
- Luis Mariutti – bass guitar
- Eloy Casagrande – drums
- Fabio Ribeiro – keyboards
