= Time to Be Free =

Studio album by Andre Matos
- Released: October 2007
- Genre: Heavy metal, power metal
- Length: 69:41
- Label: Avalon/Marquee Inñ
- Producer: Sascha Paeth, Roy Z

Andre Matos chronology
Time to Be Free (2007)	Mentalize (2009)

Time to Be Free is the debut solo album by Brazilian singer/pianist Andre Matos. He is joined by Hugo Mariutti and his brother Luís Mariutti, with whom he played in the band Shaman. The title of the album refers to both Matos getting his chance to have full creative control, as well as the concept of having free time.

== Track list ==
1. "Menuett" – 00:48 (Andre Matos)
2. "Letting Go" – 06:04 (Andre Matos/Pit Passarell/Hugo Mariutti/Luís Mariutti)
3. "Rio" – 06:00 (Andre Matos/Hugo Mariutti)
4. "Remember Why" – 05:55 (Andre Matos/Pit Passarell)
5. "How Long (Unleashed Away)" – 04:50 (Andre Matos/Roy Z/Hugo Mariutti/Andre Hernandes)
6. "Looking Back" – 04:56 (Andre Matos/Hugo Mariutti)
7. "Face the End" – 05:12 (Andre Matos/Alberto Rionda)
8. "Time to Be Free" – 08:33 (Andre Matos/Hugo Mariutti/Luís Mariutti)
9. "Rescue" – 05:58 (Andre Matos/Hugo Mariutti/Luís Mariutti)
10. "A New Moonlight" – 08:57 (Andre Matos)
11. "Endeavour" – 07:02 (Andre Matos/Fábio Ribeiro)
12. "Separate Ways (Worlds Apart)" – 05:17 (Japanese bonus track) (Jonathan Cain/Steve Perry)

== Charts ==
- #2 Japan
- #2 France
- #4 Russia

== Personnel ==
- Andre Matos – vocals, piano
- Andre Hernandes – guitars
- Hugo Mariutti – guitars
- Luís Mariutti – bass
- Rafael Rosa – drums
- Fábio Ribeiro – keyboards
