= Reason (Shaman album) =

Studio album by Shaman
- Released: August 23, 2005
- Recorded: Creative Studios, Nossoestudio, São Paulo, Brazil; Fasm Auditorium, São Paulo, Brazil; Sonhos e Sons, Belo Horizonte, Brazil; Gate Studio, Wolfsburg, Germany
- Genre: Heavy metal, power metal
- Length: 49:20
- Label: Deckdisc (Brazil); AFM (Europe and US); Victor (Japan)
- Producer: Sascha Paeth, Philip Colodetti, Shaman

Shaman chronology
RituAlive (2003)	Reason (2005)	Immortal (2007)

Reason is the second studio album by the Brazilian heavy metal band Shaman, first released in 2005. "Innocence" was released as the band's first single.

== Track listing ==
All lyrics are written by André Matos, except "More" (lyrics by Andrew Eldritch).

No.	Title	Music	Length
1.	"Turn Away"	Hugo Mariutti	4:21
2.	"Reason"	H. Mariutti	4:40
3.	"More"	Andrew Eldritch; Jim Steinman	4:02
4.	"Innocence"	Matos	4:37
5.	"Scarred Forever"	H. Mariutti	5:20
6.	"In the Night"	Ricardo Confessori	5:54
7.	"Rough Stone"	Luis Mariutti	5:56
8.	"Iron Soul"	Confessori	5:24
9.	"Trail of Tears"	Matos	3:47
10.	"Born to Be"	Matos	6:00

== Personnel ==
Shaaman

- André Matos – vocals, piano, keyboards
- Hugo Mariutti – guitars
- Luís Mariutti – bass
- Ricardo Confessori – drums

Additional personnel

- Miro – keyboard arrangements and programming, sound effects
- Junior Rossetti – keyboards, sound effects
- Fabio Ribeiro – organ
- Marcus Viana – violin, cello, Indian dioruba, rabbab
- Helder Araujo – sitar, tablas
- Amanda Somerville – backing vocals, narration, vocal coaching
- The São Paulo State Symphony Ensamble:
  - Svetlana Terechkova, Andrea Campos Misiuk, Soraya Landim, Matthew Thomas Thorpe, Camila Tamae Yasuca, Cesar Augusto Miranda – violins
  - Svetlana Bogatyreva, Tania Campos Kier – violas
  - Douglas Kier, Wilson Sampaio – cellos

Production

- Sascha Paeth – producer, engineer, mixing, mastering
- Philip Colodetti – co-producer, engineer, mastering
- Glenn Zolotar, Ricardo Nagata, Luizinho Mazzei, Eduardo Avellar, Evandro Lopez – engineers
