= Corciolli =

Brazilian composer and musician (born 1968)

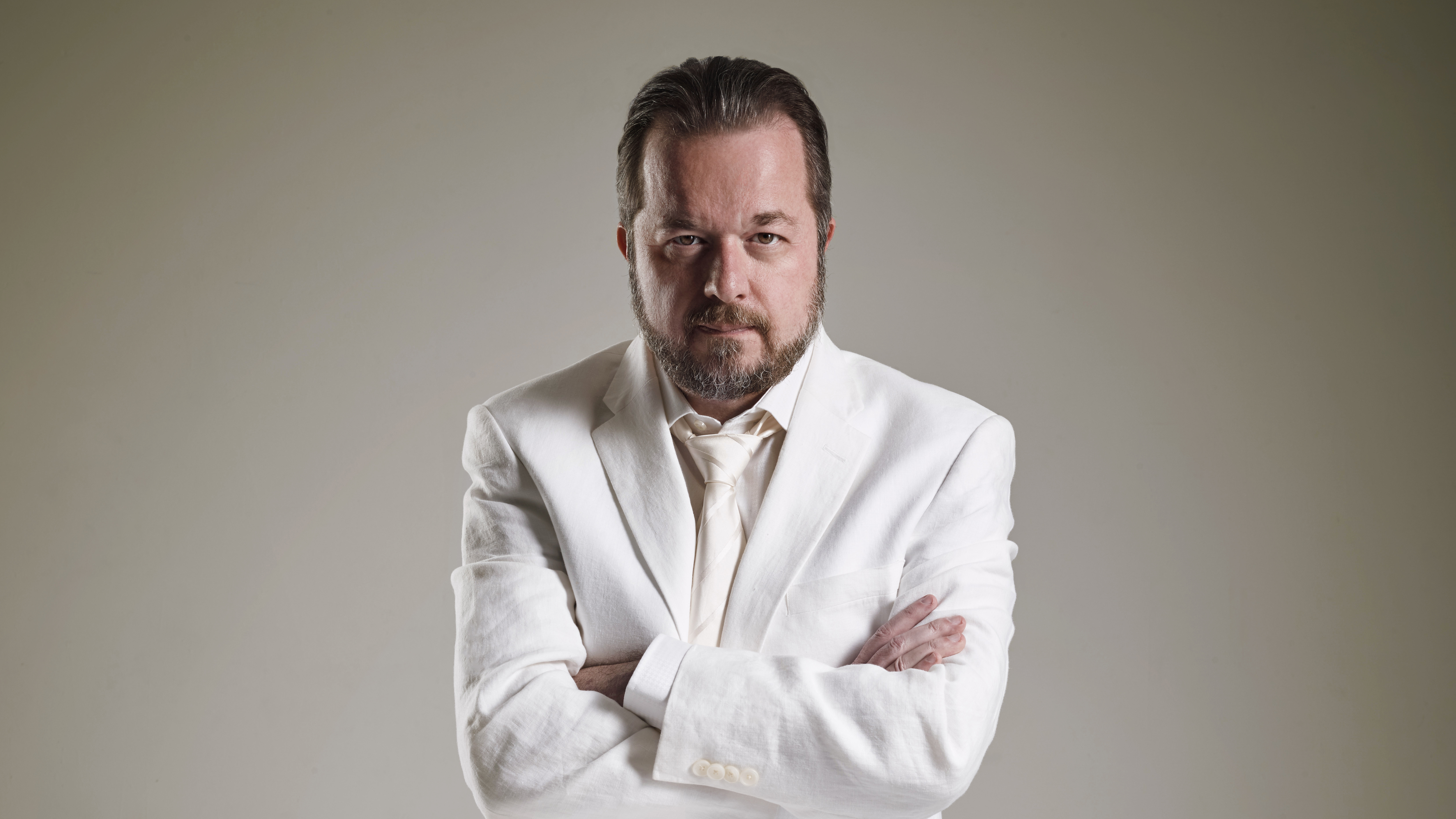

Background information
- Born: January 8, 1968 (age 58); São Paulo, SP, Brazil
- Genres: Electronic; classical; ambient; progressive rock; world music
- Occupations: Composer, instrumentalist and producer
- Instruments: Piano, Synthesizers
- Years active: 1993–present
- Label: Azul Music
- Website: www.corciolli.com

Born January 8, 1968, in São Paulo, Corciolli is a Brazilian composer, instrumentalist, and producer known for his innovative use of piano, acoustic and electronic synthesizers in his compositions. He is also the founder of the classical music record label, Azul Music.

== Biography ==
Brazilian composer, instrumentalist, and producer from São Paulo, Corciolli was born in 1968, starting his piano studies at the age of 15 with Nair Tabet, Magdalena Tagliaferro's assistant. He then delved into popular music, studying harmony and improvisation with Cacho Souza and, later, Claudio Leal Ferreira. However, it was electronic synthesizers, with their unlimited sonic possibilities, that deepened his relationship with music and composition.

He graduated with a degree in architecture without leaving music in the background: Over the years, he played in several bands and projects, with highlights on the work developed with the Brazilian bass legend Celso Pixinga and with the rumba flamenca group Espirito Cigano. In 1993, he founded his own record label, Azul Music, and released his first album All That Binds Us, starting a successful discography, which includes more than 2M CDs sold, 400M streams and 12 “Play de Ouro” (Gold Records) certifications, awarded by the Brazilian Association of Independent Music (ABMI).

Featured in film soundtracks and participation in compilations alongside artists such as Hans Zimmer, Vangelis, The Alan Parsons Project, Sarah Brightman, Enigma and Luciano Pavarotti, his music leads the listener to evocative sound worlds, creating timeless connections between different genres and sonorities.

Music to be heard in the silent spaces of the soul.

== Discography ==
Albums

- All That Binds Us (1993)
- Unio Mystica (1995)
- The New Moon of East (with Tibetan Monks of Gaden Shartse) (1997)
- Exotique (1998)
- Unio Celestia (1999)
- Shaman (2001)
- Sea (2001)
- Angels (2001)
- Yoga (2001)
- Feng Shui (2001)
- Reiki (2001)
- Colors (2001)
- Aroma (2001)
- Nature (2001)
- Celts (2001)
- Art of Seduction (2001)
- A Glance (2004)
- Footprints (2005)
- Songs for the Ocean (2007)
- The Astral City (2008)
- Lightwalk (2009)
- Lightwalk (Live at Auditorio Ibirapuera) (2010)
- Messengers of Light, Vol. 1 (2010)
- Messengers of Light, Vol. 2 (2010)
- Messengers of Light, Vol. 3 (2010)
- O Filme dos Espíritos (Music from the Motion Picture)(2011)
- The Very Best of (2011)
- Infinito (2015)
- Ilusia (2017)
- Jubilee (2018)
- Imaginary Brazil (2019)
- Futura (with Emmanuele Baldini) (2020)
- Silent Worlds (2021)
- No Time But Eternity (2021)
- H2O (2023)
- Songs of Dust and Shadow (2025)
- H2O (Deluxe) (2025)
- Abstracta (2025)

Other projects

- Trilhas – Gel Campannatti (1994)
- Girassol – Ed Ribeiro Lima & Cia. (1994)
- Planeta & Planeta NovaEra (1994–1998)
- Aquilon with Alpha Phoenix (1996)
- As Sete Tentações da Vida – Original Soundtrack (with Luiz Gasparetto) (2000)
- A Energia Musical dos Números (with Aparecida Liberato) (2001)
- Corciolli in the Mix – Various Artists (2001)
- Notas Suaves, Momentos Serenos (2004) Reader's Digest
- Caras Zen (2004) Caras
- Essas Mulheres (2005) Record TV
- Solaris 3 (2005) Som Livre
- Música do Mundo (2005) Caras
- Mentalize – Andre Matos (2009)
- Cris Cabianca – Cris Cabianca (2011)
- No Grão de Areia, o Sol – Ana Ariel (2012)
- Salve Regina – Juliano Ravanello (2013)
- Vanilla – Cris Cabianca (2014)
- Reminiscences, Vol. 2 – Clara Sverner (2020)
- Reminiscences, Vol. 1 – Clara Sverner (2020)

== Soundtracks ==
- Fala Sério! (Director: Augusto Sevá) (2010) Albatroz Cinematográfica
- O Filme dos Espíritos (Director: André Marouço, Michel Dubret) (2011) Mundo Maior / Paris Filmes
- Tais & Taiane (Director: Augusto Sevá) (2021) Albatroz Cinematográfica / Pandora Filmes
