= Tem pra Todo Mundo =

Tem Pra Todo Mundo

Studio album by Viper
- Released: 1996
- Genre: Alternative rock
- Length: 38:26
- Label: Castle Music

Viper chronology
Coma Rage (1995)	Tem Pra Todo Mundo (1996)	Everybody Everybody (1999)

Tem pra Todo Mundo is the fifth album by Brazilian heavy metal band Viper, released in 1996. Its pop-oriented alternative rock style was not very well received by many of the band fans.

It was the band's first album in Portuguese.

== Track listing ==
1. "Dinheiro [Money] (Pit Passarell)" — 2:56
2. "Crime Na Cidade [Crime in the City] (Pit Passarell)" — 2:51
3. "Oito De Abril [April 8] (Pit Passarell)" — 4:09
4. "Sábado [Saturday] (Pit Passarell)" — 2:59
5. "Not Ready To Get Up (Pit Passarell)"— 3:44
6. "Quinze Anos [15 Years] (Felipe Machado)" — 3:56
7. "Na Cara Do Gol [In Front of the Goal] (Pit Passarell)" — 2:32
8. "The One You Need (Renato Graccia)" — 3:37
9. "Lucinha Bordón (Yves Passarell/Roger Moreira)" — 2:30
10. "Alvo [Target] (Felipe Machado/Alvin L)" — 3:10
11. "Um Dia [One Day] (Yves Passarell)" — 3:33
12. "Mais Do Mesmo [More of the Same] (Dado Villa-Lobos/Renato Russo/Renato Rocha/Marcelo Bonfá)" (Legião Urbana cover) — 2:46
13. "Agradecimentos e Zoação [Thanks and Taunts] (Pit Passarell/Yves Passarell/Felipe Machado/Renato Graccia)" — 7:49

== Personnel ==
- Pit Passarell - vocal, bass guitar
- Yves Passarell - guitars
- Felipe Machado - guitars
- Renato Graccia - drums
