= O Filme dos Espíritos =

2011 film directed by Michel Dubret, André Marouço

- Brazilian theatrical poster
- Directed by: Michel Dubret; André Marouço
- Written by: André Marouço; Michel Dubret
- Produced by: Pollyana Pinheiro; Sabrina Franzoi
- Starring: Reinaldo Rodrigues; Nelson Xavier; Ana Rosa; Briza Menezes; Alethéa Miranda; Ênio Gonçalves
- Music by: Corciolli
- Production company: Mundo Maior Filmes
- Release date: 7 October 2011
- Running time: 98 minutes
- Country: Brazil
- Language: Portuguese

O Filme dos Espíritos is a 2011 Brazilian drama film directed by Michel Dubret and André Marouço, based on the book The Spirits Book by Allan Kardec. The film was released in Brazil on October 7, 2011 in celebration of the birthday month of Kardec.

== Plot ==
The film follows the story of Bruno Alves (Reinaldo Rodrigues) that, by the age of 40, loses his wife. The loss of his job adds to its deep sadness and suicide seems the only way out. That's when he meets The Spirits Book, work of the spiritist doctrine.

== Cast ==
- Flávio Barollo as Dante
- Sandra Corveloni as Mother
- Blota Filho as Man in the séance
- Etty Fraser as Dona Maria
- Luciana Gimenez as Roseli
- Ênio Gonçalves as Waiter / former inmate
- Briza Menezes as Luisa
- Alethea Miranda as Daughter
- Reinaldo Rodrigues as Bruno Alves
- Ana Rosa as Gabi
- Warley Santana as Funeral's makeup artist
- Nelson Xavier as Levy
