= Obskure =

Brazilian death metal band

- Origin: Brazil
- Genres: Death metal
- Years active: 1989–present
- Members: Amaudson Ximenes; Daniel Boyadjian; Jolson Ximenes; Wilker Dângelo; Fábio Barros; Germano Monteiro
- Website: www.myspace.com/obskuredeathmetal

Obskure is a death metal band from Ceará Brazil, formed in 1989.

== History ==
The band was formed in May 1989, by the brothers Amaudson and Jolson Ximenes.

The group cast the demo tapes Uterus and Grave (1990), Oppressions in Obscurity (1992) and The Singing Of Hungry (1994) and joined several collective albums by independent labels in Brazil and abroad.

In 1998, they released their first full-length album, Overcasting.

In 2001 the band released a promo-CD, The emptiness Spectable, with the participation of Alex Camargo from Krisiun on vocals and they were invited to play alongside the thrash band in the closing concert of their world tour for the album Conquerors of Armageddon in São Paulo. In 2005, they released the promo-CD From one who stopped dreaming.

In 2008, the band was chosen among fifty others to represent Ceará in the national phase to represent Brazil at the Wacken Open Air, held in São Paulo. Right after it, they launched their video-clip "Christian Sovereign".

The band's second album, entitled Dense Shades of Mankind, was released in early 2012. It has been well received by the critics.

The band was to be at the Metal Open Air festival, but cancelled their performance, as many other invited bands.

== Members ==
- Germano Monteiro (vocals)
- Amaudson Ximenes (rhythm guitar)
- Daniel Boyadjian (lead guitar/vocals)
- Jolson Ximenes (bass)
- Wilker Dângelo (drums)
- Fábio Barros (keyboard)

== Discography ==
- Uterus and Grave - 1990
- Oppressions in Obscurity - 1992
- The Singing of Hungry - 1993
- Overcasting (Promo-tape) - 1996
- Overcasting (CD) - 1998
- The Emptiness Spectable - 2001 (EP CD)
- From One Who Stopped Dreaming - 2005 (EP CD)
- Dense Shades of Mankind - 2012 (CD)
- Sacrifice of the Wicked - 2017
