= Pasarell =

Pasarell is a surname. Notable people with the surname include:

- Charlie Pasarell (born 1944), Puerto Rican tennis player
- Emilio J. Pasarell (1891–1974), Puerto Rican short story writer
- Stanley Pasarell (born 1948), Puerto Rican tennis player

== See also ==
- Passarell
