= Ricardo Confessori =

Brazilian drummer

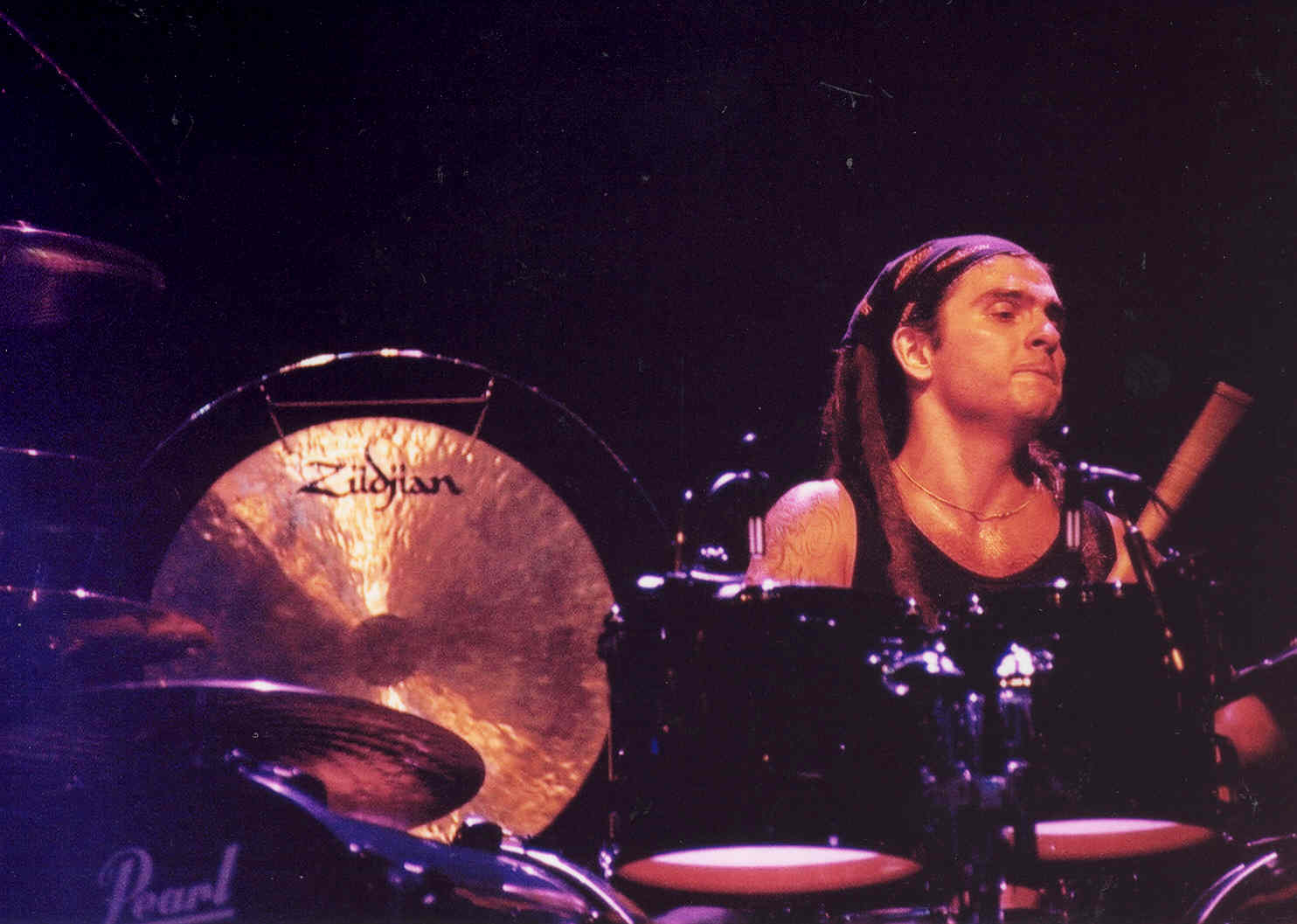
- Confessori performing in 2002

Background information
- Born: January 25, 1969 (age 57); São Paulo, Brazil
- Genres: Progressive metal, Power metal
- Occupation: Musician
- Instruments: Drums, percussion, guitar
- Years active: 1990–present
- Member of: Confessori
- Formerly of: Angra, Shaman, Korzus
- Website: ricardoconfessori.com

Ricardo Confessori (born January 25, 1969) is a Brazilian drummer, composer, producer and a former member of Brazilian power metal and progressive metal bands Angra and Shaman.

== Biography ==
After leaving the Brazilian thrash metal band Korzus, Confessori was invited for assume the post of drummer of Angra, after the recording of the album Angels Cry.

In 2000, Confessori left Angra with singer Andre Matos and bassist Luis Mariutti to form the band Shaman together with guitarist Hugo Mariutti. Shaman released three albums with this line-up: Ritual (2002); RituAlive (live album, released in CD and DVD in 2003); and Reason, in 2005. After the second album, Confessori and Matos had some creative differences. Confessori owned the Shaman name resulting in the other members leaving the band. In 2009, Confessori returned to Angra, replacing the drummer Aquiles Priester. In 2014 it was announced that he had once again left the band.

He also served as a guest/live musician for parodic heavy metal band Massacration, under the pseudonym "El Perro Loco", from 2016 to 2022.

Ricardo Confessori endorses: RMV drums and drumheads, Drum Shop USA snares, Zildjian cymbals and Vic Firth drumsticks.

== Discography ==
Angra

- Live Acoustic at FNAC (EP) (1995)
- Holy Land (1996)
- Holy Live (live album) (1997)
- Freedom Call (EP) (1997)
- Fireworks (1998)
- Aqua (2010)
- Angels Cry 20th Anniversary (live album) (2013)
- Live at Loud Park 2013 (live album) (2014)

Shaman

- Ritual (2002)
- RituAlive (live album) (2003)
- Reason (2005)
- Immortal (2007)
- Anime Alive (live album) (2008)
- Origins (2010)
- One Live: Shaman & Orchestra (live album) (2011)
- Rescue (2022)

Bittencourt Project

- Brainworms I (2008)
- Live Brainworms in Brazil (live album) (2017)

Garcia & Garcia

- Mr. Fire (1991)

Massacration

- Live Metal Espancation (2017)

Secret Alliance

- Solar Warden (2020)
- Revelation (2021)

Heaven's Guardian

- Live at Goiania Theater (2018)

Silent Cry

- Hypnosis (2016)

Confessori

- Realm Breaker (2026)
