= Yves Passarell =

Brazilian musician (born 1969)

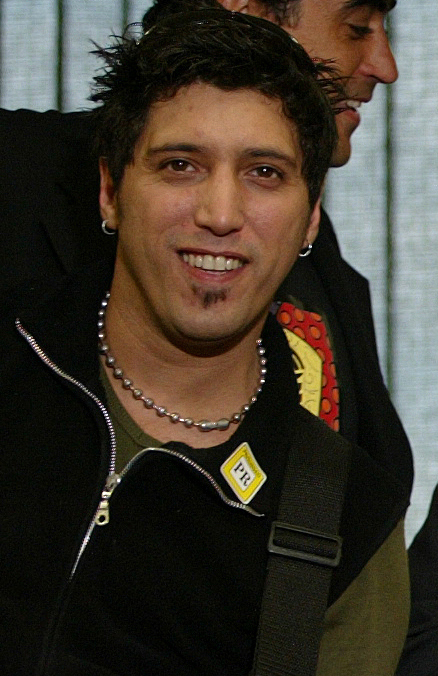
- Passarell in 2003

Background information
- Birth name: Osvaldo Yves Murad Passarell
- Born: 8 February 1969 (age 56); São Paulo, Brazil
- Genres: Heavy metal; rock
- Occupations: Musician; songwriter
- Instruments: Electric guitar
- Years active: 1985–present
- Member of: Capital Inicial
- Formerly of: Viper

Osvaldo Yves Murad Passarell (born 8 February 1969), known professionally as Yves Passarell, is a Brazilian musician and songwriter best known for his work with heavy metal band Viper, of which he was one of its founding members, and rock band Capital Inicial, in which he plays the electric guitar since 2001.

Born in São Paulo on 8 February 1969, his family hails from Buenos Aires, Argentina. He began to play instruments influenced by his mother, a pianist, and at 14 years old took part as a musician in several school festivals. He and his older brother, Pit Passarell, formed Viper alongside long-time acquaintance Felipe Machado in 1985; he served as the band's guitarist until its first break-up in 1999, subsequently joining Brasília-based rock band Capital Inicial in 2001, for which he also wrote several songs alongside his brother Pit.

In 2005, Passarell was featured in the documentary 20 Years Living for the Night, produced in celebration of his former band Viper's 20th anniversary. Beginning in 2012, he took part in commemorative shows by Viper, serving as a guest musician on their 2023 album Timeless and collaborating with Felipe Machado on his solo project. Parallel to his musical career, he also wrote the memoir Temporada na Estrada, regarding his years with Viper, and the novel Os Últimos Dias Perfeitos, published by Gryphus Editora in 1999 and 2002 respectively.

== Discography ==
Viper

- (1985) The Killera Sword (demo)
- (1987) Soldiers of Sunrise
- (1989) Theatre of Fate
- (1992) Evolution
- (1992) Vipera Sapiens (EP)
- (1993) Maniacs in Japan (live album)
- (1995) Coma Rage
- (1996) Tem pra Todo Mundo
- (2023) Timeless (as guest musician)

Capital Inicial

- (2002) Rosas e Vinho Tinto
- (2004) Gigante!
- (2007) Eu Nunca Disse Adeus
- (2008) Multishow ao Vivo: Capital Inicial (live album)
- (2010) Das Kapital
- (2012) Rock in Rio: Capital Inicial (live album)
- (2012) Saturno
- (2014) Viva a Revolução (EP)
- (2015) Acústico NYC (live album)
- (2018) Sonora
- (2022) Capital Inicial 4.0 (live album)

Felipe Machado

- (2022) Primata (as guest musician)

== Bibliography ==
- Temporada na Estrada: Histórias de uma Banda de Rock (Gryphus Editora, 1999)
- Os Últimos Dias Perfeitos (Gryphus Editora, 2002)
