= Maniacs in Japan =

Live album by Brazilian metal band Viper

Live album by Viper
- Released: 1993
- Recorded: April 18, 1993
- Venue: Club Cittá, Tokyo, Japan
- Genre: Heavy metal
- Length: 57:45
- Label: Massacre Records

Viper chronology
Vipera Sapiens (1992)	Maniacs in Japan (1993)	Coma Rage (1995)

Maniacs in Japan
Review scores
Source	Rating
AllMusic	2/5 stars
Rock Hard	7/10 stars

Maniacs in Japan is a live album by Brazilian heavy metal band Viper. It is a recording of a concert in Club Cittá, Tokyo on 18 April 1993. Most, but not all, of this concert can be watched in the documentary 20 Years Living for the Night.

== Track listing ==
CD
No.	Title	Writer(s)	Length
1.	"Intro (Brazil) / Coming from the Inside"	Pit Passarell	4:02
2.	"To Live Again"	P. Passarell	3:05
3.	"The Shelter"	Felipe Machado	3:37
4.	"A Cry From the Edge"	Passarell, Machado	4:56
5.	"Dead Light"	Yves Passarell	3:53
6.	"Knights of Destruction"	P. Passarell	3:06
7.	"We Will Rock You" (Queen cover)	Brian May	2:33
8.	"Acid Heart"	P. Passarell, Machado	3:07
9.	"Still the Same/Drum Solo"	Machado	7:13
10.	"Evolution"	P. Passarell	7:06
11.	"Não Quero Dinheiro" (Tim Maia cover)		3:04
12.	"Living For the Night"	P. Passarell	5:33
13.	"Rebel Maniac"	P. Passarell	4:00
14.	"I Wanna Be Sedated" (Ramones cover)	Joey Ramone	2:14

== Personnel ==
- Pit Passarell - vocals, bass guitar
- Yves Passarell - guitars
- Felipe Machado - guitars
- Renato Graccia - drums
