= Korzus =

Brazilian thrash metal band

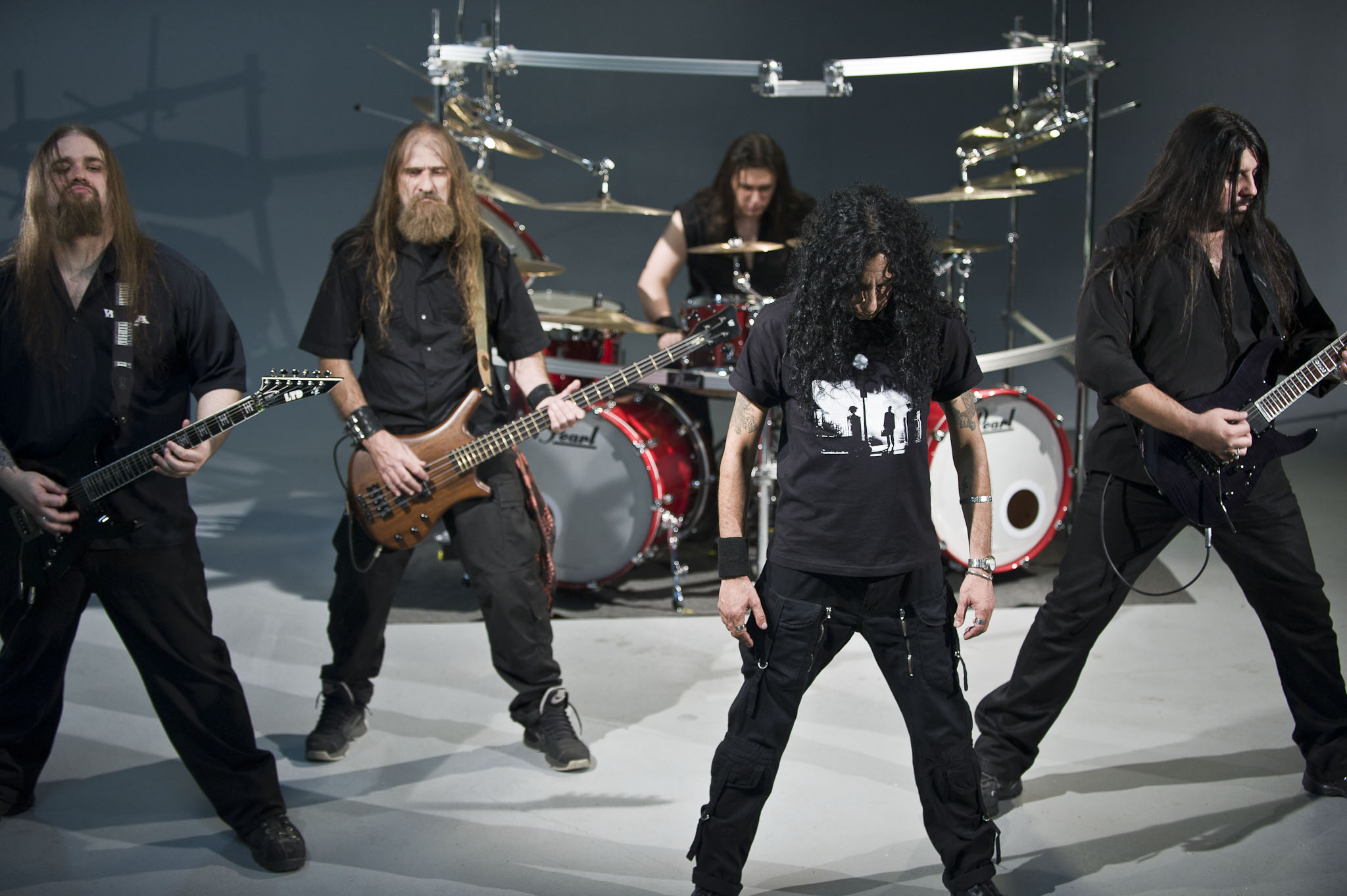
- Korzus in 2011

Background information
- Origin: São Paulo, São Paulo, Brazil
- Genre: Thrash metal
- Years active: 1983–present
- Labels: AFM, Devil Discos
- Members: Marcello Pompeu; Dick Siebert; Rodrigo Oliveira; Jean Patton; Jessica Falchi
- Past members: Silvio Golfetti; Roberto "Betão" Sileci; Marcello Nicastro; Ricardo Confessori; Eduardo Toperman; Fernando Schaefer; Marcelo "Soldado" Nejen; Maurício S. Oliveira "Brian"; Zema Paes; Antônio Araújo; Heros Trench
- Website: www.korzus.com.br

Korzus is a Brazilian thrash metal band.

The band currently consists of Marcello Pompeu (vocals), Dick Siebert (bass), Jean Patton, Jessica Falchi (guitars), and Rodrigo Oliveira (drums).

== History ==
The group first appeared in October 1983, with a lineup of Marcello Pompeu (vocals), Marcello Nicastro "NICA" (guitar), Silvio Golfetti (bass), and Luiz Maurício S. Oliveira "Brian" (drums). The band's first name, Hand Of Doom (taken from a song by Black Sabbath), was used only to participate in the "1st Musical Encounter of Colégio Costa Braga". Afterwards, they chose Korzus, taken from the door of drummer Zema's closet, written by guitarist Marcos Kekas from the band Ethan.

Two years later, featuring Silvio, Dick, and Pompeu, alongside Eduardo Toperman (guitar) and Maurício "Brian" (drums), they recorded the tracks "Guerreiros do Metal" and "Príncipe da Escuridão" for the compilation SP Metal 2, released by Baratos Afins.

The song "Guerreiros do Metal" was popular among headbangers of the time, and projected Korzus into the Brazilian national scene, resulting in the album Korzus ao Vivo (Devil Discos) in 1986.

The following year, Toperman and Brian left the band, and drummer Zema Paes joined. This lineup recorded the band's first studio album, Sonho Maníaco (Devil Discos). In 1987, after a series of shows across Brazil, Zema committed suicide occurred. His replacement, Roberto Sileci "Betão", was recruited at the same time that Silvio started sharing guitars with Marcello Nicastro "NICA".

During this phase, the band wrote in English and released the album Pay For Your Lies (Devil Discos) in 1989.

The 1991 album Mass Illusion (Devil Discos) led Korzus to play numerous shows and film their first music video, for the song "Agony". In April 1992, they went on their first international concert tour, the Mass Illusion European Tour 92, with dates in France, Italy, England, and Germany.

Despite positive reception and more shows in Brazil, in 1993, drummer "Betão" was replaced with Ricardo Confessori (Angra, Shaman, and Garcia & Garcia), who stayed until the end of the year until Fernando Schaefer "Fernandão" replaced him. Around that time, Marcello Nicastro "NICA" left the band and signed with Eldorado Records (Runaway Records label) to pursue a solo career.

They played a few shows as a quartet until the arrival of Marcelo Nejen "Soldado". In 1995, KZS was released, an album produced by Steve Evetts (producer for bands like Sepultura, Symphony X, M.O.D., Skid Row, Whiplash, and Misfits, among others), featuring the tracks "Internally" and "Namesake", which had music videos.

In December 1996, they went on their first tour in the United States, playing alongside Biohazard and S.O.D.. In 1998, "Soldado" and Fernandão left and were replaced with Heros Trench and Rodrigo Oliveira, respectively. That year, they were a national highlight at the Monsters Of Rock festival, which led to the release of the live CD Live At Monsters Of Rock, featuring live tracks and studio bonus songs. The event included bands such as Dorsal Atlântica (RJ), Glenn Hughes, Savatage, Dream Theater, Saxon, Manowar, Megadeth, and Slayer.

Their subsequent album, Ties Of Blood (2004), put the band back at the top tier of the national scene, with Korzus embarking on an extensive promotional tour. This work featured guest appearances by vocalist André Matos on the track "Evil Sight" and guitarist Andreas Kisser on several tracks.

In 2006, Korzus released their first DVD, titled Video História, containing twenty-nine tracks.

In 2007, Marcelo "Soldado" Nejen was invited to temporarily replace Silvio Golfetti, who was undergoing treatment for his left arm due to a fracture sustained years earlier. André Curci (Threat, Musica Diablo) also served as a temporary replacement.

In 2010, after a six-year hiatus without any new compositions, Korzus released the album Discipline of Hate. The work was released worldwide by the German label AFM Records. Initially, the work contained thirteen tracks, but different bonus tracks were introduced in the editions for Brazil, the United States, Japan, and Europe.

The year 2011 was very productive for the band; in February they embarked on a seventeen-show European tour alongside the Hungarian group Ektomorf, and also in February, their presence was confirmed at the 2011 Rock in Rio festival alongside major names in world music. Also in 2011, the band contributed a song to the soundtrack of the documentary Brasil Heavy Metal.

In April 2012, they participated in the Metal Open Air festival.

In October 2014, the band released the album Legion, via AFM.

In 2017, they were listed by the American magazine Loudwire as one of the 10 best bands from Latin America.

In October 2018, they played as the opening act for the German band Accept in Fortaleza.

In December 2019, the book Korzus - Guerreiros do Metal, authored by Maurício Panzone, was released, covering the band's history from the 1980s to the present day.

In April 2021, they released the song "You Can't Stop Me", which addresses themes such as bullying and "brings a strong message about human conduct".

In 2024, they participated in Summer Breeze Brasil. In April, they played at Abril Pro Rock, alongside Leather, Krisiun, and Matanza Ritual. In July, they took part in the Esquenta Rockfun Fest 2024, alongside Suicidal Tendencies.

In May 2024, guitarist Antônio Araújo announced his amicable departure from the group after sixteen years of tenure. The decision was motivated by logistical family issues, such as his return to the city of Recife, and the need to focus entirely on his other band, Matanza Ritual. Later, in November 2025, the band officially announced the departure of guitarist Heros Trench, who had been part of the group for 27 years. The cycle was closed in pursuit of creative and artistic renewal.

The group structured a new phase in their career and, on 2 April 2026, officially announced their new lineup with the addition of guitarists Jean Patton (ex-Project46) and Jessica Falchi. To solidify this new moment, Korzus released a brand new single and music video for the track "No Light Within".

== Band members ==
=== Current members ===
- Marcello Pompeu - lead vocals (1983–present) Founding Member
- Dick Siebert - bass (1984–present)
- Rodrigo Oliveira - drums (1997–present)
- Jean Patton - guitar (2026–present; touring/session musician 2022, 2024–2026)
- Jessica Falchi - guitar (2026–present)

=== Past members ===
- Maurício Brian - drums (1983–1986) Founding Member
- Paulo Alves - drums (1986–1987)
- Junior Andrade - guitar (1987)
- Zema Paes - drums (1987–1988)
- Roberto Sileci - drums (1988–1993)
- Ricardo Confessori - drums (1993)
- Fernando Schaefer - drums (1993–1997)
- Silvio Golfetti - guitar (1983–2008) Founding Member
- Eduardo Toperman - guitar (1984–1987)
- Marcello Nicastro - guitar (1983–1994) Founding Member
- Soldado - guitar (1994–1998)
- Antônio Araújo - guitar (2008–2024)
- Heros Trench - guitar (1998–2025)

== Discography ==
=== Studio albums ===
- 1987 - Sonho Maníaco
- 1989 - Pay for Your Lies
- 1991 - Mass Illusion
- 1995 - KZS
- 2004 - Ties of Blood
- 2010 - Discipline of Hate
- 2014 - Legion

=== Singles ===
- 2021 - You Can't Stop Me
- 2026 - No Light Within

=== Live albums ===
- 1986 - Korzus - Ao Vivo
- 2000 - Live at Monsters of Rock

=== Compilations ===
- 1985 - Sp Metal 2
- 2011 - Brasil Heavy Metal
