= Coma Rage =

Studio album by Viper
- Released: 1995
- Studio: Bill's Place, Los Angeles, California, USA
- Genre: Crossover thrash
- Length: 44:32
- Label: Roadrunner
- Producer: Bill Metoyer

Viper chronology
Maniacs in Japan (1993)	Coma Rage (1995)	Tem pra Todo Mundo (1996)

Coma Rage is the fourth album by Brazilian heavy metal band Viper, released in 1995.

== Track listing ==
No.	Title	Writer(s)	Length
1.	"Coma Rage"	Pit Passarell	2:54
2.	"Straight Ahead"	Felipe Machado	4:11
3.	"Somebody Told Me You're Dead"	P. Passarell	2:30
4.	"Makin Love"	P. Passarell	4:16
5.	"Blast!"	P. Passarell	2:21
6.	"God Machine"	Machado	3:04
7.	"Far and Near"	Yves Passarell	3:16
8.	"The Last Song"	P. Passarell	4:04
9.	"If I Die by Hate"	Machado	3:33
10.	"Day Before"	Y. Passarell	2:42
11.	"405 South (Instrumental)"	Renato Graccia	1:14
12.	"A Face in the Crowd"	Machado	3:51
13.	"I Fought the Law (Sonny Curtis cover)"	Sonny Curtis	2:15
14.	"Keep the Words"	P. Passarell	4:13
Total length:			44:23

== Personnel ==
- Pit Passarell - vocal, bass, backing vocals
- Yves Passarell - guitar, backing vocals
- Felipe Machado - guitar, backing vocals
- Renato Graccia - drums, backing vocals

== Additional Info ==
- Engineered and Mixed by Bill Metoyer
- Mastered at Future Disc
- Executive Producer: Jeroen Vonk
- Cover artwork by Antonio Marcelino (Studio N)
- Cover concept/layout by Felipe Machado and Rodrigo Cerveira
- Photos by Marcelo Rossi
- Guitar Solo on "Somebody Told Me You're Dead" by Ernie-C from Body Count (appears courtesy of Virgin Records America, Inc.)
