= Younique =

American multi-level marketing company

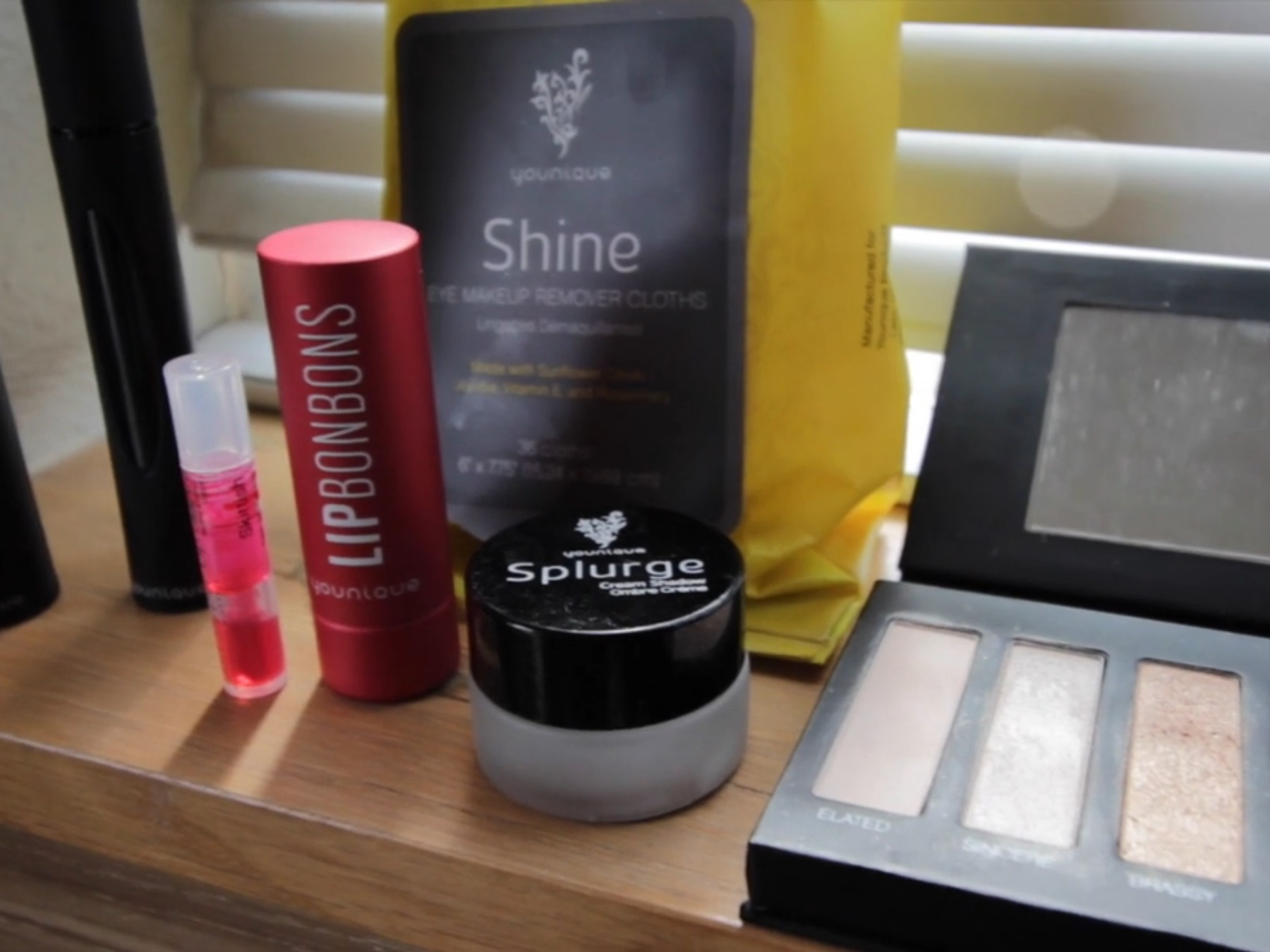
- Company type: Private
- Industry: Cosmetics, network marketing
- Founded: September 2012; 13 years ago
- Founders: Derek Maxfield, Melanie Huscroft
- Headquarters: Lehi, Utah, United States
- Area served: United States, Canada, Australia, New Zealand, United Kingdom, Mexico, Germany, France, Spain, Hong Kong, Italy, Ireland, Portugal, Belgium, Austria, Colombia and Netherlands
- Products: Cosmetics
- Website: www.youniqueproducts.com

Younique is an American direct selling multi-level marketing company that markets beauty products. The company was founded in 2012 by Derek Maxfield, who is CEO, and Melanie Huscroft, and is headquartered in Lehi, Utah. Between 2017 and 2019, Younique was 60% owned by Coty, Inc. In 2019, Coty sold their share of the business back to Maxfield and Huscroft.

As of 2024, Brian Holman is President and Monica Wihongi is Chief Sales & Marketing Officer with Derek Maxfield remaining CEO.

== Business model ==
Younique produces cosmetics that are marketed by its Brand Ambassadors and Brand Affiliates who earn a commission on sales. Younique sellers are required to continuously purchase products to maintain their status within their company, regardless of whether they are able to sell these products onward. Like other multi-level marketing companies, Younique sellers are encouraged to recruit other people to become Brand Ambassadors and Affiliates. The company uses social media to market their products and sales representatives use their social networks to promote and sell their products, and host virtual parties. Commissions begin at 20%, and increase to 25% as sellers reach $1000 in total sales. Further increases are only possible if they recruit others as sellers, from whose sales they receive additional commission. In 2019, The Guardian described Younique's business practices, alongside those of other MLMs, as akin to pyramid schemes, reporting that many Younique presenters lost money in the process of selling for the company.

The company's business model has been compared to other multi-level marketing sales companies such as Avon Products, though with a larger focus on sales via social media. Digiday attributed the company's quick growth to its reliance on digital selling, compared to other MLM brands' reliance on in person sales; The Wall Street Journal also reported that founder Maxfield's use of his personal story, involving his Mormon faith and experience of surviving leukemia, was another tactic used for recruiting salespeople that differentiated Younique from other MLMs.

== Products ==
Younique's product line includes makeup products for eyes, lips, and faces. Younique also has products for skin care, including Younique Royalty which launched in 2016, and is geared towards anti-aging. In 2019, Younique launched Moodstruck Epic 4D One-Step Fiber Mascara that sold 1 million units within 6 months. The same year, Younique launched an augmented reality tool that allows buyers to virtually try products before purchasing.

In August, 2019, Younique agreed to pay $3.25 million to resolve claims that they deceptively marketed their Moodstruck 3D Fiber Lashes mascara as consisting of “100% Natural Green Tea Fibers.”

== Ownership ==
Younique was majority owned by Coty, Inc. between 2017 and 2019. Coty purchased a 60% stake in Younique for $600 million in January 2017. This acquisition valued Younique at $1 billion. Younique's founders continue to own 40% of the company. The acquisition increased Coty's profits in 2018, with Younique witnessing double-digit sales growth in its second quarter. However, Younique's revenues and profits declined year-over-year in 2019, and Coty announced that it was cutting ties with Younique in August 2019 and sold back its stake to Younique founders.
