= Viper (band) =

Brazilian heavy metal band

- Origin: São Paulo, Brazil
- Genres: Heavy metal; power metal; thrash metal; progressive metal; alternative rock
- Years active: 1985–1996; 2004–2009; 2012–present
- Members: Leandro Caçoilo; Felipe Machado; Renato Graccia; Kiko Shred
- Website: viperbrazil.com.br

Viper is a Brazilian heavy metal band formed in 1985, initially influenced by Iron Maiden and the new wave of British heavy metal, later developing a very particular sound.

== History ==
Viper recorded their first demo tape in 1985, The Killera Sword, and in 1987, they released their first album, Soldiers of Sunrise — which, despite the simple production and the somewhat flawed English in the lyrics, showcased the degree of talent and skill of the band's members, all of them teenagers at the time.

In 1989, they released Theatre of Fate, notable for the metal and classical music mix, with a song based on Beethoven's Moonlight Sonata; another noteworthy song is Living for the Night. This album was released in several countries and granted them international fame – especially in Japan, where it outsold renowned groups like Nirvana and Van Halen.

Not long after that, however, singer Andre Matos left Viper to go to complete his education in music at a University in Germany. Upon returning to Brazil he joined the band Angra.

Rather than look for another singer, bassist (and main composer) Pit Passarell took over the microphone. This led to the first major change in the band's style, noticeable in their next album, Evolution, released in 1992 – heavier, more direct, with a more thrash metal sounding. Again, it is a commercial success with good reviews.

On 18 April 1993, Viper played in Club Cittá, Tokyo; this concert's record was later released as Maniacs in Japan.

In 1995, they released their next album, Coma Rage, in which a punk influence is quite strong – as the presence of a cover version of "I Fought the Law" makes very clear. Despite mixed reviews, it is again a fine seller. However, the band has stated later that, in hindsight, they are far from satisfied with the album's mixing.

1996 was possibly the band's darkest moment: soon after the release of Tem Pra Todo Mundo – their first album with lyrics in Portuguese, and a lighter, pop-like sound – their record label at the time (the Brazilian arm of Castle Communications) went bankrupt; legal disputes and the disappearance of the album's masters prevented the re-release of the album by some other label, or the recording of another album by Viper. The band's activities came to a halt, despite never officially breaking up.

In 1999, the compilation Everybody Everybody – The Best of Viper was released to celebrate fifteen years of Viper.

In 2001, the band officially returned to their activities, doing some concerts around the Brazil. Soon after, guitarist Yves Passarell left Viper to keep his focus on his new band, Capital Inicial, a renowned Brazilian pop-rock band; his brother Pit also worked with this band as a composer.

In 2004, with a new singer, Ricardo Bocci, Viper resumed touring in Brazil, and in 2005 they released a DVD documentary, 20 Years Living for the Night.

In December 2005, the band released a "20 years of Viper" DVD, detailing the history of the band. They also started working in the pre-production of a new album, and recorded a demo; in February 2006 they started recording the album. All My Life was finally released in June 2007. After a tour in Brazil, Viper went into hiatus again; in February 2010, Bocci announced that, given the band's inactive status, he had left it to work in his solo career.

Andre Matos joined the band again in 2012 for a new Brazilian tour. Commenting on this reunion, he said:

"I was friends with everybody again, and we started seeing each other again. [...] When the idea came now last year [2012] that we should do an anniversary tour and celebrate the first album, everybody was very, very positive about it. So we just needed to figure out when it would be the best time to do it, when everyone would have some free spots in their agendas to match together and to actually make it work, and it did work."

== Members ==
=== Current ===
- Felipe Machado – guitars (1985–present)
- Guilherme Martin – drums (1989–1990, 2001–2005, 2012–present)
- Leandro Caçoilo – vocals (2017–present)
- Kiko Shred – guitars (2021–present)
- Daniel Matos – bass (2024–present)

=== Former ===
- Andre Matos – lead vocals (1985–1990, 2012–2016; died 2019)
- Yves Passarell – guitars (1985–1996)
- Pit Passarell – bass (1985–2024; his death), lead vocals (1991–2004)
- Cassio Audi – drums (1985–1989)
- Renato Graccia – drums (1991–1996, 2005–2009)
- Val Santos – guitars (2001–2007), drums (1989)
- Ricardo Bocci – lead vocals (2004–2009)
- Marcelo Mello – guitars (2007–2009)
- Hugo Mariutti – guitars (2012–2020)

== Discography ==
=== Studio albums ===
- Soldiers of Sunrise (1987)
- Theatre of Fate (1989)
- Evolution (1992)
- Coma Rage (1995)
- Tem pra Todo Mundo (1996)
- All My Life (2007)
- Timeless (2023)

=== Other releases ===
- The Killera Sword (demo, 1985)
- Vipera Sapiens (EP, 1993) (Note: Originally, Vipera Sapiens was released exclusively in Japan, in 1993, to promote the band's Japanese tour - it was only released in Brazil 25 years later in 2018.)
- Maniacs in Japan (live album, 1993)
- Everybody Everybody (compilation, 1999)
- Do It All Again (demo, 2005)
- To Live Again – 25 Years (live album, 2015)
- "The Spreading Soul Forever" (single, 2020)

=== Documentaries ===
- 20 Years Living for the Night (2005)

== See also ==
- Angra
- Shaman
