= Motorocker =

Brazilian rock band from Curitiba

- Origin: Curitiba, Paraná, Brazil
- Genres: Hard rock, blues rock, heavy metal
- Years active: 1992 or 1993–present
- Members: Marcelus dos Santos; Juan Neto; Luciano Pico; Silvera Krüger; Mayer
- Past members: Eduardo Calegari; Jean Mokwa; Thomas "Índio Véio" Jefferson

Motorocker is a Brazilian rock band from Curitiba, Paraná, formed in the early 1990s. Initially an AC/DC cover band, starting in the 2000s they began to release their own music, debuting in 2006 with the album Igreja Universal do Reino do Rock ("Universal Church of the Kingdom of Rock").

Motorocker has shared the stage with bands such as Deep Purple, Motörhead, Iron Maiden, Kiss and Nazareth, featuring in a tribute to the latter organized by their guitarist Manny Charlton, covering "Telegram".

== History ==
=== Beginning and Igreja Universal do Reino do Rock (1990s–2006) ===
The group was founded by vocalist Marcelus dos Santos, a former mechanic and muay thai instructor, but their exact year of birth is uncertain; most sources cite the year 1992, but some claim it was 1993 or even the end of the 1980s. In an interview to the UFPR newspaper, the quintet explained that the member were already acquainted from the local scene, with guitarist Thomas "Índio Veio" Jefferson being the last to join, in the mid 1990s. Stil in the 1990s, they had until at least 1997 Jean Mokwa as the bassist.

In 2006, they had their original material debut with the album Igreja Universal do Reino do Rock ("Universal Church of the Kingdom of God"), released via Marhceco Records, a label belonging to one of their fans, Luciano Haluch. The effort combined both old and then recent songs.

=== Rock na Veia (2010–2012) ===
In 2010, the band released their second studio album, titled Rock na Veia ("Rock in the Vein"), with a release show held on 15 October. Back then, their line-up consisted of Marcelus dos Santos on vocals, Luciano Pico and Thomas Jefferson on the guitars, Silvio Krüger on bass and Juan Neto on the drums. The album contains 12 tracks, including "Homem Livre" ("Free Man"), planned as a duet with Ivo Rodrigues (Blindagem, A Chave), but later transformed into a tribute to him following his death; and the single "Vamo Vamo" ("Let's Go"), which was released with two other songs.

In 2011, they created their own beer, the Munich Dunkel Motorocker, initially produced by brewery Weinsky Beer, from Contenda, and later (at least starting in 2013) produced by another brewery, this one from Araucária and managed by Luciano Wenski. Also in 2011, they supported Iron Maiden in Curitiba.

In 2012, they took part in the Longlife festival in Maringá, alongside Zé Geraldo, Sublime with Rome, The Dirty Heads and Dead Fish.

=== Rock Brasil (2013–2020) ===
In 2013, Motorocker was raising funds for a new work. In September of the following year, they released their third album, Rock Brasil, and embarked on a promotional tour in November.

In 2015, still with Thomas Jefferson in the line-up, they played at Rock in Rio for the first time. In 2017, guitarist Eduardo Calegari joined the band, succeeding Jefferson.

In an interview to the website Wikimetal published in February 2019, they said they had a new work ready, but decided not to release it in 2018 due to the political polarization around Brazil amidst that year's elections. Also in 2019, they took part in the Crossroads Festival celebrating World Rock Day, alongside Dead Fish, Matanza Inc and nearly 40 other acts. A single named "Bom Pra Você" ("Goof for You") was released that same month.

In June 2020, they announced the death of former bassist Jean Mokwa, who played with them back when they were an AC/DC cover band.

=== Death of Eduardo Calegari and later projects (2021–present) ===
In February 2021, they announced the death of guitarist Eduardo Calegari, due to COVID-19. Back then, bassist Sílvio Krüger said they were preparing a new album which would have performances by Calegari. Since at least 2022, they have Mayer as Calegari's successor.

In May 2021, they announced another brand of beer, this time an IPA called Motorocker – Road IPA via brewery Coice de Mula.

In July 2022, they released via Editora Falare a comic book titled Blues do Satanás, written by vocalist Marcelus dos Santos, illustrated by Sérgio Bonfim e named after one of the tracks of their debut album Igreja Universal do Reino do Rock.

In January 2024, they shared stage with Velhas Virgens as CWB Hall re-opened that year.

In 2024, the group released the EP Moto & Rock. Two tracks from it, "Dona do Meu Coração" ("Owner of My Heart") and "Só Mais Uma Vez" ("Just One More Time"), inspired a short film named after the latter, starring John Lemes and Dama do Rock as a couple, directed by drummer Juan Neto and released in November of that year. The title track received a video recorded in a street of Curitiba and starring firefighter Altair Guidini, who plays the role of his own brother, Luiz Ricardo Guidini, a fellow firefighter who died in 2023 and was known as "Hero Firefighter".

In December 2025, they played at the Ho Ho Natal Rock n’Roll festival in Curitiba, alongside Blindagem and Hillbilly Rawhide.

== Discography ==
=== EPs ===
- Moto & Rock (2024)

=== Albums ===
- Igreja Universal do Reino do Rock (2006)
- Rock na Veia (2010)
- Rock Brasil (2014)

=== Singles ===
- "Vamo Vamo" (2008)
- "Bom Pra Você" (2019)

== Members ==
=== Current ===
- Marcelus dos Santos — vocals
- Luciano Pico — guitar
- Mayer — guitar
- Silvera Krüger — bass
- Juan Neto — drums

=== Former ===
- Eduardo Calegari — guitar (2017—2021; his death)
- Thomas "Índio Veio" Jefferson (mid-1990s—at least 2015) — guitar
- Jean Mokwa — bass
