= Theatre of Fate =

Studio album by Viper
- Released: 15 of October 1989
- Recorded: August 1989
- Genre: Progressive metal
- Length: 34:39
- Label: Massacre
- Producer: Roy M. Rowland

Viper chronology
Soldiers of Sunrise (1987)	Theatre of Fate (1989)	Evolution (1992)

Professional ratings
Review scores
Source	Rating
AllMusic	4.5/5 stars

Theatre of Fate is the second studio album by Brazilian heavy metal band Viper. It was re-released in 1997 by Paradoxx Music in a 2-in-1 edition with the Soldiers of Sunrise album.

In a 2013 interview, when commenting on the production and recording of the album, vocalist Andre Matos said:

[...] it was a huge jump from one level to another level. We hired an English producer called Roy Rowland who came to Brazil. The guy was really good, and we were so lucky that we had probably one of the best studios in town available for us. It was an old studio back from the 50s or the 60s, you know, from the cinema times. They used to record full orchestras there, and they had wonderful equipment, like live board and tape recorders and all kinds of microphones and all kinds of rooms and acoustic piano and orchestra available, and everything. So it was a completely different reality [...]

"Moonlight" is based on Beethoven's "Moonlight Sonata".

== Track listing ==
All lyrics are written by Pit Passarell (except where noted); all music is composed by Viper

No.	Title	Length
1.	"Illusions"	1:51
2.	"At Least a Chance"	3:59
3.	"To Live Again"	3:29
4.	"A Cry from the Edge" (Passarell/Machado)	5:11
5.	"Living for the Night"	5:26
6.	"Prelude to Oblivion"	3:45
7.	"Theatre of Fate"	6:18
8.	"Moonlight" (Matos)	4:40
Total length:		34:39

== Personnel ==
- Andre Matos — vocals
- Pit Passarell — bass guitar
- Yves Passarell — lead guitar
- Felipe Machado — rhythm guitar
- Sérgio Facci — drums
