= Soldiers of Sunrise =

Studio album by Viper
- Released: May 1987
- Recorded: April 1987
- Studio: Estúdios Guidon in São Paulo
- Genre: Heavy metal
- Length: 34:37
- Label: Rock Brigade
- Producer: André Cagni

Viper chronology
The Killera Sword (1985)	Soldiers of Sunrise (1987)	Theatre of Fate (1989)

Professional ratings
Review scores
Source	Rating
Allmusic	4/5 stars

Soldiers of Sunrise is the first album by Brazilian heavy metal band Viper, released by Rock Brigade Records in 1987. It was re-released by Massacre Records in 1992 and re-released again in 1997 by Paradoxx Music in a 2-in-1 edition with the Theatre of Fate album. In 2013, through WikiMetal, a new edition was released, including the six songs of the Killera Sword demo tape as bonus tracks.

In a 2013 interview, when commenting on the recording of the album, vocalist Andre Matos said:

The whole record was done basically in a week. It was like, 'One, two, three, go,' and the whole background was recorded almost live. Then there were some overdubs for the solos and stuff, and then it was my part to do the voice in two or three days. And I remember the last days my voice was completely ruined. I had no technique at all back then, and I completely ruined my voice. I had to record this last song called 'HR,' which translated means 'Heavy Rock', and we were even thinking about calling somebody else to sing it because I was not able to sing a single note. But then we said, 'Ah, we can do it a little bit more punk rock like,' so I could sing with my rough voice, which I was able to let go at that moment.

== Track listing ==
1. "Knights of Destruction" — 3:12 (Pit Passarell)
2. "Nightmares" — 3:36 (Andre Matos, Cássio Audi, Felipe Machado, Pit Passarell, Yves Passarell)
3. "The Whipper" — 3:10 (Andre Matos, Cássio Audi, Felipe Machado, Pit Passarell, Yves Passarell)
4. "Wings of the Evil" — 3:55 (Pit Passarell)
5. "H.R." — 3:15 (Felipe Machado, Pit Passarell)
6. "Soldiers of Sunrise" — 6:52 (Andre Matos, Cássio Audi, Felipe Machado, Pit Passarell, Yves Passarell)
7. "Signs of the Night" — 3:30 (Pit Passarell, Yves Passarell)
8. "Killera (Princess of Hell)" — 2:38 (Pit Passarell, Yves Passarell)
9. "Law of the Sword" — 4:29 (Felipe Machado, Pit Passarell)

Bonus tracks (WikiMetal Edition):
10. "Law of the Sword" Demo (Felipe Machado, Pit Passarell)
11. "Signs of the Night" Demo (Pit Passarell, Yves Passarell)
12. "Nightmares" Demo (Andre Matos, Cássio Audi, Felipe Machado, Pit Passarell, Yves Passarell)
13. "H.R." Demo (Felipe Machado, Pit Passarell)
14. "The Whipper" Demo (Andre Matos, Cássio Audi, Felipe Machado, Pit Passarell, Yves Passarell)
15. "Killera (Princess Of Hell)" Demo (Pit Passarell, Yves Passarell)

== Credits ==
- André Matos — lead vocals
- Pit Passarell — bass guitar & backing vocals
- Yves Passarell — lead guitar
- Felipe Machado — rhythm guitar
- Cassio Audi — drums

OBS: Val Santos was the drummer during most of the tour for this album. Felipe Machado played at the first show of the tour at Teatro Rio Branco and traveled the next day to finish high school in the US, returning a year later at the end of the tour, before the band starts working on the next album Theatre of Fate. During his absence was replaced by War Kings guitarist Rodrigo for some of the shows.
