= Evolution (Viper album) =

Studio album by Viper
- Released: 1992
- Recorded: April – June 1992
- Genre: Thrash metal
- Length: 44:20
- Label: Massacre Records
- Producer: Charlie Bauerfeind

Viper chronology
Theatre of Fate (1989)	Evolution (1992)	Vipera Sapiens (1993)

Professional ratings
Review scores
Source	Rating
AllMusic	4/5 stars

Evolution is the third album by Brazilian heavy metal band Viper, release in 1992.

== Track listing ==
1. "Coming from the Inside" (P. Passarell) — 3:55
2. "Evolution" (P. Passarell) — 5:17
3. "Rebel Maniac" (P. Passarell) — 3:34
4. "Dead Light" (Y. Passarell) — 4:06
5. "The Shelter" (Machado) — 4:04
6. "Still the Same" (Machado) — 4:32
7. "Wasted" (P. Passarell, Machado) — 4:51
8. "Pictures of Hate" (P. Passarell, Machado) — 4:40
9. "Dance of Madness" (P. Passarell) — 4:30
10. "The Spreading Soul" (P. Passarell) — 4:53
11. "We Will Rock You" (May) (Queen cover) — 2:15

== Credits ==
- Pit Passarell — bass guitar, vocals
- Yves Passarell — guitar
- Felipe Machado — guitar
- Renato Graccia — drums

Additional musicians:

- Sascha Paeth - backing vocal
- Thomas Rettke - backing vocal
- Helge Engelke - string arrangements
