= Pit Passarell =

Argentine-born Brazilian musician (1968–2024)

- Born: Pedro Sérgio Murad Passarell; 11 April 1968; Buenos Aires, Argentina
- Died: 27 September 2024 (aged 56) São Paulo, Brazil
- Genres: Heavy metal; rock
- Occupations: Singer-songwriter; musician
- Instruments: Bass; vocals
- Years active: 1985–2024
- Formerly of: Viper

Pedro Sérgio Murad Passarell (11 April 1968 – 27 September 2024), known professionally as Pit Passarell, was an Argentine-born Brazilian singer-songwriter and bassist famous for his work with heavy metal band Viper, of which he was one of two of its founding members to remain consistently in all of the group's line-ups alongside guitarist Felipe Machado. Later in his career, he also wrote several songs for Brasília-based rock band Capital Inicial, for which his younger brother Yves plays the electric guitar.

Born in Buenos Aires on 11 April 1968, his family moved to São Paulo, Brazil while he was still an infant. He and his brother Yves Passarell formed Viper alongside long-time acquaintance Felipe Machado in 1985; Pit initially served as the band's bassist, becoming its vocalist in 1991 following the departure of Andre Matos. He was responsible for writing some of their most recognizable songs, such as "To Live Again", "Living for the Night", "Evolution", "Come from the Inside", "Soldiers of Sunrise" and "Rebel Maniac". Following Yves' departure to become guitarist for Capital Inicial in 2001, he and Pit also wrote songs for the latter band, such as "O Mundo", "Seus Olhos", "Depois da Meia-Noite", "Algum Dia" and "Instinto Selvagem". Pit was replaced by Ricardo Bocci as Viper's vocalist in 2004, but would remain as the group's bassist, his most recent album with them being 2023's Timeless.

In 2005, Pit was featured in the documentary 20 Years Living for the Night, produced in celebration of Viper's 20th anniversary. In 2007, he wrote two songs, "Letting Go" and "Remember Why", for the solo debut of his former Viper bandmate Andre Matos, Time to Be Free.

On 28 August 2020 Pit released his debut solo album, Praticamente Nada, originally recorded between 2008 and 2009. "O Mundo", a cover of a song he originally wrote for Capital Inicial, came out as a teaser single the month prior, followed by "Que Seja Eterno o Nosso Amor" and "Seus Olhos".

In mid-2024 Pit was diagnosed with pancreatic cancer; he died while undergoing treatment later that year, on 27 September, at the age of 56. His wake was held at the Funeral Home complex in Bela Vista, São Paulo. Daniel Matos, brother of Andre Matos, subsequently took his place as Viper's bassist.

== Personal life ==
Until her death in 2019 Pit was married to Thais, with whom he had a daughter. The eponymous song "Thais" of Viper's 2023 album Timeless was dedicated to her.

== Discography ==
Viper
For a more comprehensive list, see Viper discography

- (1987) Soldiers of Sunrise
- (1989) Theatre of Fate
- (1992) Evolution
- (1995) Coma Rage
- (1996) Tem pra Todo Mundo
- (2007) All My Life
- (2023) Timeless

Solo

- (2020) Praticamente Nada
