= Felipe Machado =

Brazilian journalist, writer and musician

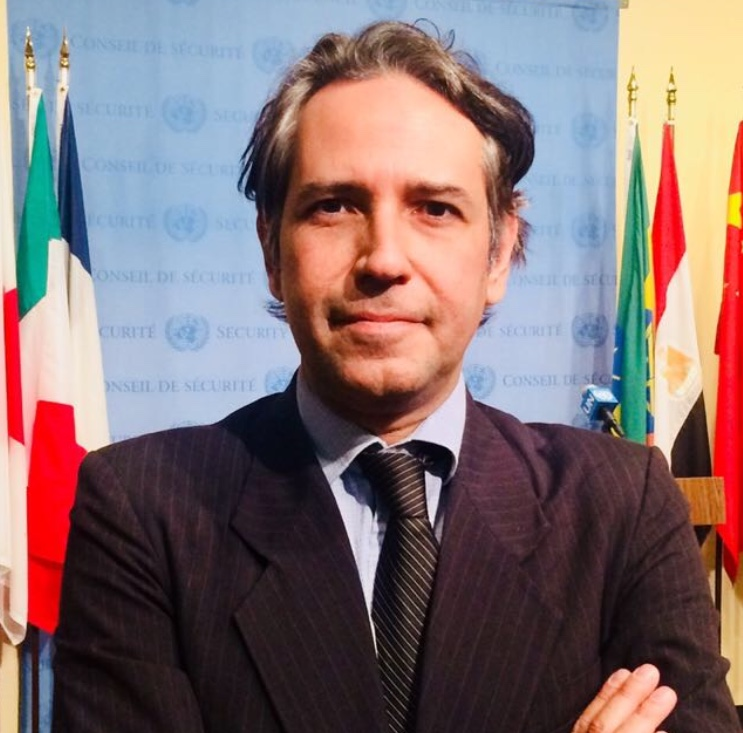
- Machado at UN in 2017
- Born: Luis Felipe Machado de Oliveira; August 4, 1970 (age 56); São Paulo, Brazil
- Occupations: Journalist; writer; musician
- Musical career
- Genres: Heavy metal; rock; Brazilian rock; pop rock
- Instruments: Guitar; vocals
- Years active: 1985–present
- Member of: Viper, FM Solo

Luis Felipe Machado de Oliveira (Brazilian Portuguese pronunciation: [feˈlipi maˈʃadu, fiˈ-]; born August 4, 1970) is a Brazilian journalist, writer and musician. He is currently the Communications Director for Worldfund, a nonprofit organization with educational projects. His journalistic career includes leading positions at a few of Brazil's most relevant media companies, such as O Estado de S. Paulo, R7 and Diário de S.Paulo. As a writer, he produced two novels, two non-fiction works and an award-winning children's book.

In music, Machado started in 1985 as the guitarist and co-founder of the heavy metal band Viper, playing in all the band's releases and concerts until recent times. In 2016, he released his first solo album as singer, songwriter and guitar player named FM Solo.

== Career in communications ==
In 1993, he graduated in communications at the Faculdade Cásper Líbero, and concluded his master's degree in digital communication in 2009 in the University of Navarra.

Due to his high musical activity during his graduation time, he postponed working in the area until 1996, when he worked as redactor at DPZ (today DPZ&T), an advertising agency for two years.

Then, in 2000 he joined the late Jornal da Tarde, a newspaper owned by Grupo Estado, where he was a reporter, columnist and editor. After that, he was the first multimedia editor of Grupo Estado and also being responsible for the creation of TV Estadão. During this period, Machado has directed two documentaries for O Estado de S. Paulo. The first, Mordaça no Estadao (Gagging the Newspaper O Estado de SP), delves into the history of censorship and authoritarian power in Brazilian media during the 1970s. The second, Um Paraíso Perdido (Paradise Lost), recounts the trip of the famed Brazilian writer Euclides da Cunha into the Amazon one hundred years ago.

Later in 2011, he left Grupo Estado and moved to a news company called Diário de S. Paulo, where he was responsible for the management of all the crews for digital media, commercial projects and strategic partners.

After that, in 2013, he was bureau chief for R7, where he was responsible for managing journalist crews in different regions of Brazil, like São Paulo, Brasilia, Rio de Janeiro, Belo Horizonte and Salvador.

As a freelancer, Machado has written for publications such as Citizen K, Mixte, Double (France), Vision (China), and also for some Brazil's well-known publishments. Machado is the Editor-at-Large in Brazil for Fair Observer, a digital Think Thank and website with contributors and leaders from all over the world. Among its sponsors are global names such as John Bruton, Ireland's former Prime Minister, and Kanwal Sibal, India's former Secretary of Foreign Affairs.

He is currently the communications director for Worldfund, a nonprofit organization with educational projects. He also has a blog called 'Palavra de Homem' (Man's Word).

== Career as a writer ==
Machado has released two novels, Olhos Cor de Chuva (Rain-Colored Eyes, 2002), and O Martelo dos Deuses (The Hammer of the Gods, 2007), a children's book Um Lugar Chamado Aqui (A Place Called Here, 2016, winner of the Youngsters Book of Year Award from Fundação Nacional do Livro Infantil e Juvenil), and two works of non-fiction – Bacana Bacana: As Aventuras de um Jornalista na África (Bacana Bacana: The Adventures of a Journalist in South Africa) (2010), and Ping Pong Chinês por Um Mês. As Aventuras de Um Jornalista Brasileiro Pela China Olímpica (Ping Pong: The Adventures of a Journalist in Olympic China, 2008), this last one nominated for Prêmio Jabuti, one of the most prestigious Brazilian literary awards.

== Career as a musician ==
As a musician, Machado is the founder and lead guitar player for Viper, one of Brazil's most influential hard rock acts. The band has played worldwide tours in the 90s and was one of the most popular bands in the country, with high radio airplay and MTV presence. They were the Brazilian open act for bands such as Black Sabbath, Metallica, Kiss, and Slayer, as well as Brazilian headliner for the local Monsters of Rock festival. Viper played three international tours, with live concerts in Europe, Japan, and South America and also recorded albums in Germany, United States, and a live album in Japan. In 2013, The band played in the Rock in Rio Festival, one of the biggest and most important music festivals on the planet.

Machado participated in the following albums: Soldiers of Sunrise (1987, JVC-Victor, Japan), Theatre of Fate (1989, JVC-Victor, Japan), Evolution (1992, JVC-Victor, Japan and European labels), Viper Live: Maniacs in Japan (1993, live album recorded in Tokyo, JVC-Victor, Japan), Coma Rage (1995, Roadrunner Records), Tem Pra Todo Mundo (1996, Castle Brasil), All My Life (2007, Eldorado Brasil), Viper Live in Sao Paulo (DVD, 2016, Wikimetal Records).

In 2015, Machado also released his first solo album as singer, songwriter and guitar player: FM Solo, available in all digital platforms. The album has 8 original tracks written by Machado, plus versions of Morrissey's Speedway and Athlete's Tourist. The singles were "Speedway", with a popular video filmed in Valle Nevado, Chile, and "The Shelter", a groovier version from his band, Viper.

== Bibliography ==
- Olhos Cor de Chuva (Rain-Colored Eyes, 2002)
- O Martelo dos Deuses (The Hammer of the Gods, 2007)
- Bacana Bacana: As Aventuras de um Jornalista na África (Bacana Bacana: The Adventures of a Journalist in South Africa, 2010)
- Ping Pong Chinês por Um Mês. As Aventuras de Um Jornalista Brasileiro Pela China Olímpica (Ping Pong: The Adventures of a Journalist in Olympic China, 2008)
- Um Lugar Chamado Aqui(A Place Called Here, 2016, winner of the Youngsters Book of Year Award from Fundação Nacional do Livro Infantil e Juvenil)

== Discography ==
Solo album

- FM Solo (2015)

Guest appearances

- Nine Red Moons. Sumerian Songs for the Dead (2026)

== Documentaries ==
- 20 Years Living for the Night (2005)
- Mordaça no Estadao' (Gagging the Newspaper O Estado de SP, 2009)
- Um Paraíso Perdido (Paradise Lost, 2009)
