= The Killera Sword =

Demo album by Viper
- Released: 1985
- Genre: Heavy metal
- Length: 24:13
- Label: Independent

Viper chronology
The Killera Sword (1985)	Soldiers of Sunrise (1987)

The Killera Sword is a demo album of the Brazilian heavy metal band Viper, released in 1985.

== Tracks ==
1. "Law of the Sword" - 04:38
2. "Signs of the Night" - 03:59
3. "Nightmare" - 04:25
4. "H.R. (Heavy Rock)" - 03:11
5. "The Whipper" - 05:36
6. "Killera the Princess of Hell" - 02:54
