= Hugo Mariutti =

Brazilian guitarist (born 1975)

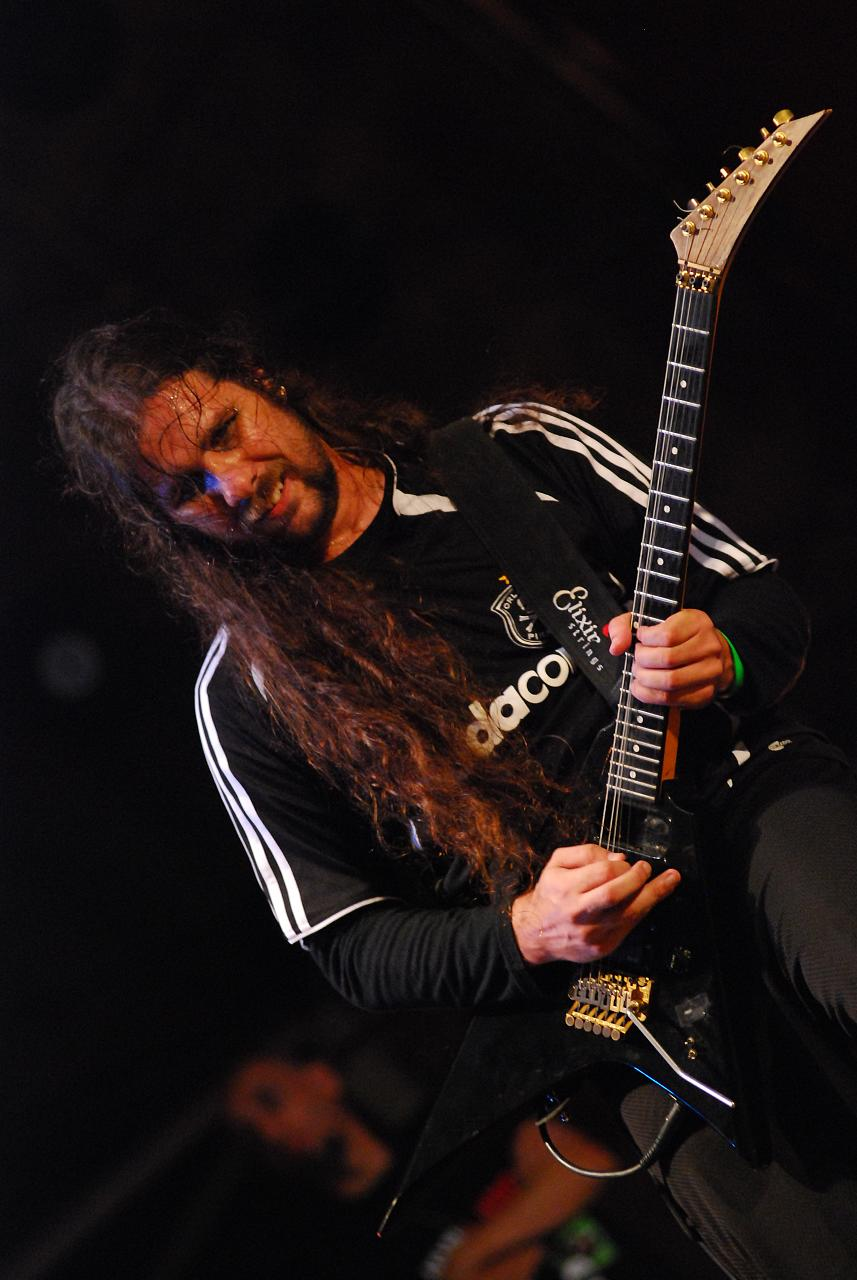

Background information
- Born: Hugo Mariutti Pereira; 18 December 1975 (age 50)
- Origin: São Paulo, Brazil
- Genres: Heavy metal Power Metal; Alternative Rock; Electronic Rock; Experimental Metal
- Occupation: Musician
- Instrument: Guitar

Hugo Mariutti (born 18 December 1975) is a Brazilian musician, best known as the guitarist of Henceforth, Viper and Andre Matos' solo band and also as the guitarist of Shaman, in which he plays with his brother Luis Mariutti, who is also the former bassist of Angra.

== Discography ==
=== Shaman ===
- (2002) – Ritual
- (2003) – RituAlive
- (2005) – Reason
- (2022) - "Rescue"

=== Andre Matos ===
- (2007) – Time to Be Free
- (2009) – Mentalize
- (2012) – The Turn of the Lights

=== Henceforth ===
- (2011) – The Gray Album

=== Remove Silence ===
- (2009) – Fade
- (2012) – Stupid Human Atrocity
- (2013) – Little Piece of Heaven

=== Solo career ===
- (2014) – A Blank Sheet of Paper
- (2017) – For a Simple Rainy Day
- (2019) – Gone (single)
- (2020) – Poems (single)
- (2021) – Why? (single)
- (2023) - "The Last Dance"

=== Other projects ===
- (2007) – Tempestt – Bring 'Em On
- (2025) – Nine Red Moons – No Man's Land (single)
- (2026) – Nine Red Moons – Sumerian Songs for the Dead - lead guitar on the song "No Man's Land"
