= Marcus Viana =

Brazilian musician

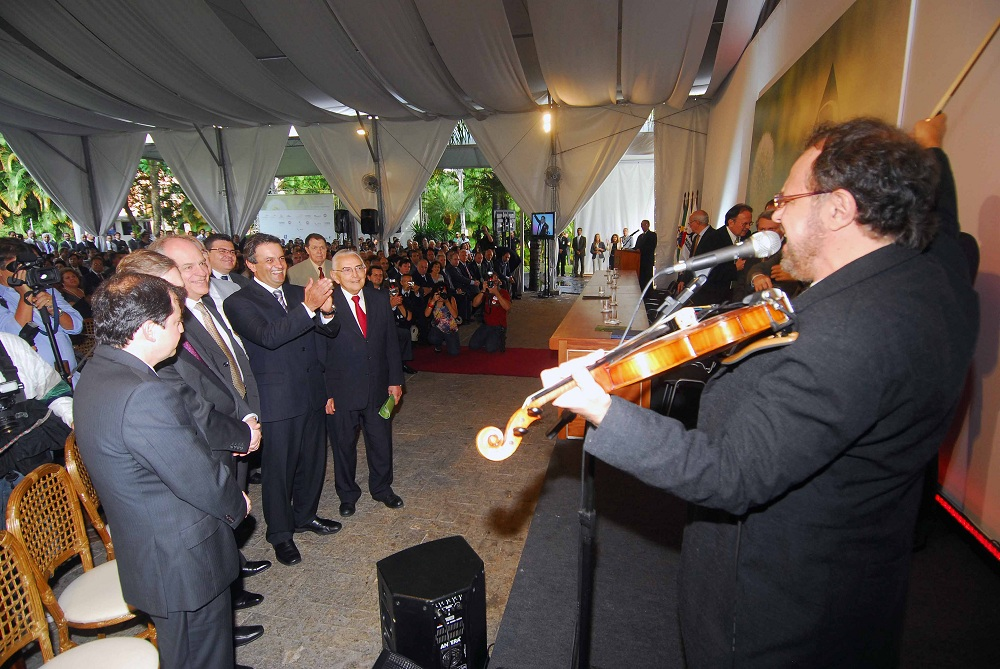
- Viana (right) in 2009 during event with then governor of Minas Gerais Aécio Neves (left, applauding)

Background information
- Born: 3 August 1953 (age 72); Belo Horizonte, Minas Gerais, Brazil
- Genres: New age, world music, Latin, progressive rock
- Occupation(s): Musician, producer
- Instrument(s): Singing, keyboards, violin
- Years active: since 1973
- Formerly of: Saecula Saeculorum, Sagrado Coração da Terra
- Website: marcusviana.com.br

Marcus Viana (Belo Horizonte, 3 August 1953) is a Brazilian violinist, singer, keyboardist and composer. He founded his own label Sonhos & Sons in the first half of the 1990s and is also the leader of progressive folk group Sagrado Coração da Terra.

== Early life and career ==
Marcus Viana is the son of Sebastião Viana, former reviewer and assistant to Heitor Villa-Lobos. He started learning music at the age of 13 when he took violin lessons with Hungarian teacher Gabor Buza, a disciple of Carl Flesch. Between 1972 and 1973, he lived in Pennsylvania, where he joined the Harvertown Symphonic Orquestra.

Back to Brazil, he joined the Minas Gerais Symphonic Orchestra and stayed with them for seven years. In 1974, he formed the progressive rock group Saecula Saeculorum.

In 1979 he founded another group, Sagrado Coração da Terra, aiming to blend progressive and symphonic music with lyrics about the environmental and spiritual issues. Since the mid-1990s, he has been focusing both on the group and on his career as a soundtrack composer for TV (such as Pantanal), cinema, theater, ballet e musicais infantis. He was nominated for a Latin Grammy Award for Best Instrumental Album in 2001 for the album Música das Esferas – Terra.

In 2004 Viana worked as music producer for the film Olga. He later worked in two more films: As Filhas do Vento e O Mundo em Duas Voltas.

== Sagrado Coração da Terra ==
The band was founded in 1979, soon after he left Saecula Saeculorum. The first album was released in 1984 and was well received, especially in Japan, where it was first released in CD format.

In 2019 Viana was planning an entire album with Andre Matos (who guest performed on "Terra" (originally by Caetano Veloso) on the album À Leste do Sol, Oeste da Lua) singing English-language versions of songs by the band, but the project was cancelled following Matos's sudden death.

Em 2001 é lançado Sacred Heart of Earth, um CD voltado para o mercado exterior, com canções importantes na carreira do Sagrado repaginadas e com letras em inglês. Em 2002, saíram duas coletâneas que também traziam algumas novas edições e arranjos: Coletânea I – Canções e Coletânea II – Instrumental.

=== Discography ===
- Sagrado (1984)
- Flecha (1987)
- Farol da Liberdade (1991)
- Grande Espírito (1993)
- A Leste do Sol, Oeste da Lua (2000)
- Sacred Heart of Earth (2001) (coletânea)
- Canções (2002) (coletânea)
- Instrumental (2002) (coletânea)
- Cosmos X Caos – A História parte 1 (2009) (DVD)
- Flores do Eden – (DVD)
