= Andre Matos =

Brazilian singer and musician (1971–2019)

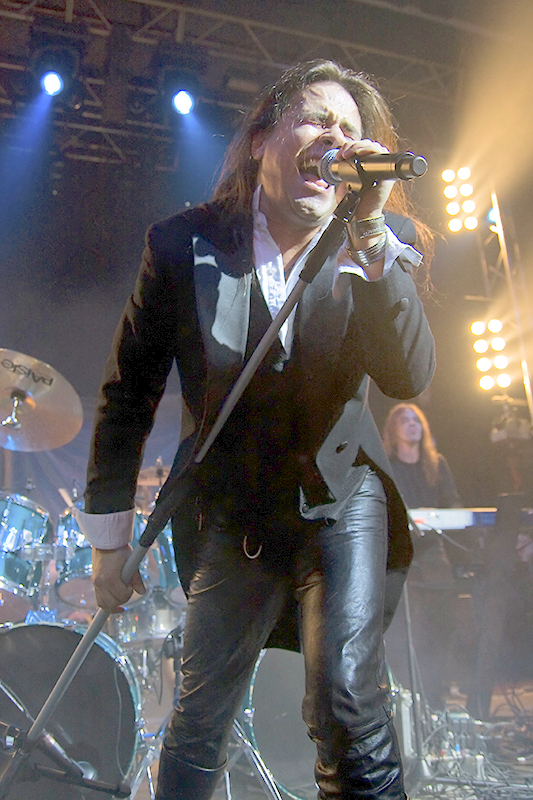
- Matos in 2009

Background information
- Also known as: Maestro do Heavy Metal
- Born: Andre Coelho Matos; 14 September 1971; São Paulo, Brazil
- Died: 8 June 2019 (aged 47) São Paulo, Brazil
- Genres: Power metal; symphonic metal; progressive metal; contemporary classical
- Occupations: Singer; musician; songwriter
- Instruments: Vocals; piano; keyboards
- Years active: 1985–2019
- Labels: Universal; JVC; SPV; AFM; Limb; Massacre; Deckdisc; Lucretia; Rock Brigade; Paradoxx
- Formerly of: Viper; Angra; Shaman; Symfonia

Andre Coelho Matos (Brazilian Portuguese: [ɐ̃ˈdɾɛ ˈmatus]; 14 September 1971 – 8 June 2019) was a Brazilian singer and musician. He was involved in the heavy metal bands Viper, Angra, Shaman and Symfonia. Since 2006, Matos had been dedicating his time to his solo career. In 2012, he was ranked No. 77 at the list of 100 Greatest Voices of Brazilian Music by Rolling Stone Brasil.

== Biography ==
=== Viper, Angra and Shaman ===
Matos grew up in his hometown of São Paulo. He began his musical education at the age of 10, when he received his first piano from his parents. As a teen, he would gather with his friends to listen to their favorite bands. Soon they began learning to play music too, and Matos joined his first band, Viper. The band first performed on 8 April 1985, when he was just 13 years old. That same year, they recorded their first demo tape, The Killera Sword.

Matos continued on vocals, but he had no intention of remaining a vocalist, a role he assumed only because his singing was the "least poor vocals of all of them", and because he physically resembled Iron Maiden's vocalist, Bruce Dickinson. His instruments of choice were always the piano and keyboard. Matos left Viper when the band began to change its musical style. He had become interested in classical music, and felt that his musical vision had begun to diverge from that of the other band members, who wanted to focus on heavier, "crude" music.

After leaving Viper, Matos went back to school and finished his education in music, specializing in orchestral conducting and music composition.

In 1991, Angra was formed, and with the first album, Angels Cry, released in 1993, the band became famous in Japan and Europe. Later, Holy Land and Fireworks were released. Angra's style evolved from a Helloween-inspired melodic speed metal to a unique blend of heavy-metal, classical music and traditional Brazilian influences which brought them worldwide critical praise.

In 2000, Matos left Angra alongside Luis Mariutti (bass) and Ricardo Confessori (drums) because of a disagreement with guitar players Rafael Bittencourt and Kiko Loureiro concerning the band's management.

Matos stayed with Mariutti and Confessori and recruited Mariutti's brother Hugo on guitar; together they formed the band Shaman. The band was a sudden success due to the song "Fairy Tale" which was featured in the Brazilian soap opera Beijo do Vampiro (Vampire Kiss). Their first album, Ritual, sold over 200.000 copies worldwide in the first year of its release and resulted in a tour with 150 concerts around the world and a DVD called Ritualive.

Their second release, Reason, kept the fame and culminated in a concert in front of 10,000 people in Rio de Janeiro. After this, the band owner and former Angra drummer Confessori fired Matos and Mariutti brothers from the band.

On 29 June 2018, Shaman announced a reunion of their original lineup to tour in celebration of their 17th anniversary.

=== Solo records Time to Be Free and Mentalize ===
Prior to his death, Matos was carrying his solo career on along with Mariutti brothers, but he often said that calling it a solo career was a big mistake; it was a band with his name, and they all decided so due to the fame of his name around the world and the frequent departure from other bands. Their first album, Time to Be Free (2007), a themed album with lyrics focused on Matos' departure from Shaman, is considered the most symphonic record written by Matos. The album charted well both in Brazil and Europe and was a success in the eyes of both critics and fans.

Time to Be Free is a more personal album, even though guitarist Hugo Mariutti wrote almost every song along with Matos and Pit Passarel, an ex-band partner of Matos in Viper, who was also a guest in this album. Besides all success heading the release of the album and the expectation over the album, Matos decided not to record any worldwide video clips; he only recorded and released an exclusive video clip for the Japanese audience which features a cover.

Time to Be Free was followed by a tour with more than 50 concerts all over the world; Matos was invited to tour with Scorpion and Edguy (an old friend, and this friendship began when Matos was in Angra and Edguy was invited to be the front act for Angra's Fireworks tour), taking place in Europe, Brazil and Japan, and in festivals like Loud Park, Live and Louder, and Finnish Metal Expo. Matos was also called to be headliner in ProgPower USA, but due to problems with their passport, they canceled the concert; he was replaced by another Brazilian band called MindFlow. At the end of the tour, Matos joined Hangar (a up-and-coming Brazilian metal band) to a metal Christmas project, before returning to the studio to record his new album.

Mentalize was released in Brasil and Japan first, at the end of 2009, and a tour started in Brazil, with concerts in Rio de Janeiro, Recife, São Paulo, Fortaleza, and some other cities. It was released in early 2010 in Europe, so Matos would profit to play in some summer festivals. Mentalize was produced by Corciolli, and mixed by Sascha Paeth.

=== Collaboration with Avantasia and Symfonia ===
In 2001, Matos was one of the guests on Tobias Sammet's metal opera Avantasia, playing the part of 'Elderane the Elf' in the Metal Opera albums. He was also part of their first world tour in 2008 as one of the main guests. In 2010, he was featured in the album The Wicked Symphony providing vocals for "Blizzard on a Broken Mirror". Matos is also featured on the live album/DVD The Flying Opera. His last appearance with Avantasia was in São Paulo on 2 June 2019, a few days before his death.

In November 2010, Matos joined Symfonia, a power metal supergroup formed in with Timo Tolkki, Uli Kusch, Jari Kainulainen, and Mikko Härkin. They made their debut performance at Finnish Metal Expo 2011 and released their first and only album In Paradisum. As touring and second album plans didn't work as planned, Timo Tolkki (guitarist, ex-Stratovarius) announced that he would stop his life in the music industry and that Symfonia would not continue as a band.

=== Reunion with Viper and Shaman ===
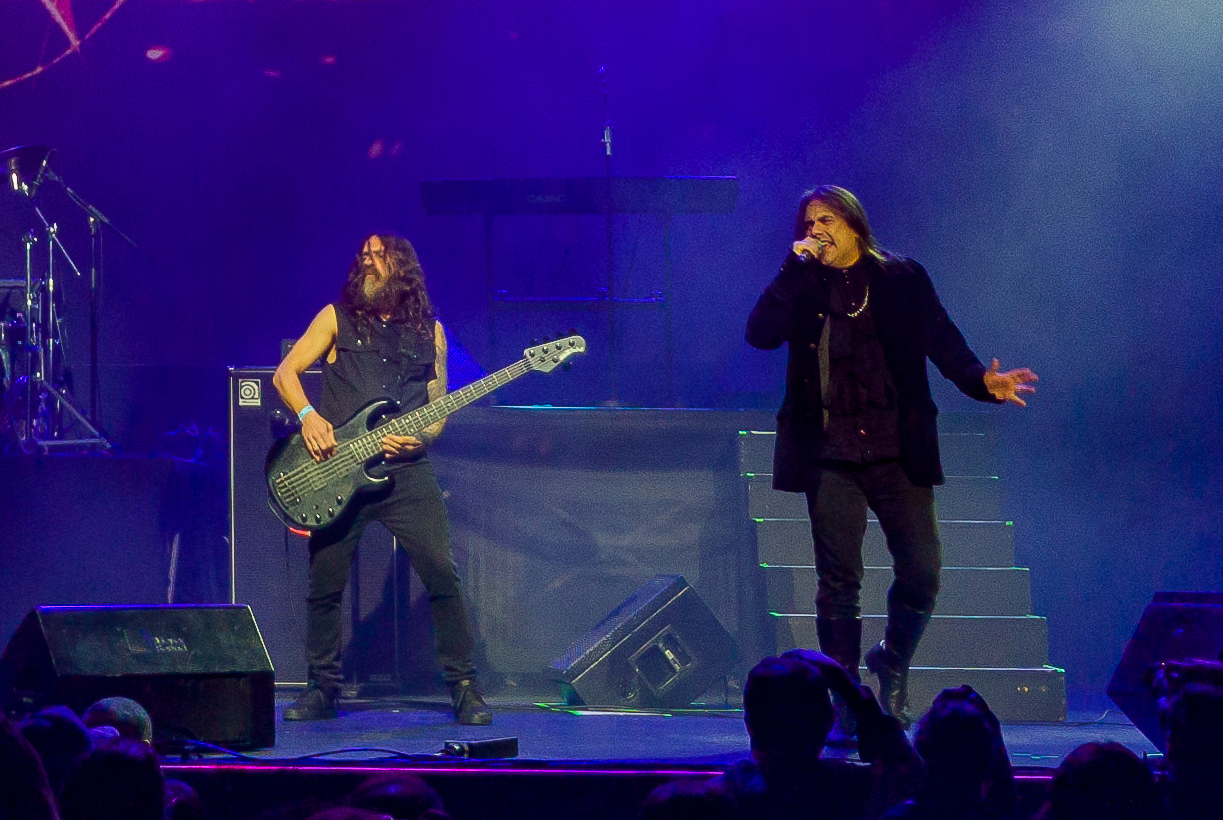
Matos (right) in one of his last shows with Shaman, 2019

On 20 April 2012, it was announced that Matos had returned to his former band Viper to make a reunion tour to celebrate the 25-year anniversary of the band's debut album, Soldiers of Sunrise. The band played its first two albums, Soldiers of Sunrise and Theatre of Fate, live in their entirety. After that, the solo band and Viper joined each other on the secondary stage of the biggest Brazilian festival, Rock in Rio, for a special concert and opening act for Helloween and Iron Maiden.

On 29 June 2018, Shaman made a reunion of their original lineup to tour in celebration of their 17th anniversary. In February 2019, Shaman were announced as a special guest with Avantasia in Brazilian concerts.

=== Death ===
Matos died on 8 June 2019, aged 47. The death was announced by a note published on social networks and signed by the members of the band Shaman. The media confirmed the news through members and press agents of the band.

It was later confirmed that Andre Matos died due to a heart attack. As a wish manifested in his life, there was no public wake and the singer's body was cremated in an undisclosed location.

On 13 July 2019, the mayor of São Paulo, Bruno Covas, officially declared 8 June as São Paulo's Heavy Metal Day.

== Andre Matos band members ==
- Andre Matos – vocals, keyboards, piano
- João Milliet – guitars
- Hugo Mariutti – guitars
- Bruno Ladislau – bass guitar
- Rodrigo Silveira – drums

=== Former members ===
- Eloy Casagrande – drums
- Rafael Rosa – drums
- Luís Mariutti – bass guitar
- Fabio Ribeiro – keyboards
- Andre Hernandes – guitars

== Discography ==
=== Solo career ===
- Time to Be Free – 2007
- Mentalize – 2009
- The Turn of the Lights – 2012
- Moonlight: The Best of Andre Matos (compilation) – 2019
- "Life Goes On" (single) – 2020

=== Viper ===
- Soldiers of Sunrise – 1987
- Theatre of Fate – 1989
- All My Life (special guest) – 2007
- To Live Again: Ao Vivo Em São Paulo – 2015
- The Spreading Soul Forever Single – 2020

=== Angra ===
- Angels Cry – 1993
- Evil Warning (EP) – 1994
- Live Acoustic at FNAC – 1995
- Holy Land – 1996
- Freedom Call (EP) – 1996
- Holy Live – 1998
- Fireworks – 1998
- Best Reached Horizons (compilation) – 2012

=== Virgo ===
- Virgo – 2001

=== Shaman ===
- Ritual – 2002
- RituAlive (live album) – 2003
- Reason – 2005
- Video Clip Reason – 2020

=== Symfonia ===
- In Paradisum – 2011

=== Other participations ===
- Nepal – Manifiesto – 1996
- Looking-Glass-Self – Equinox – 1998
- Superior – Younique (album) – 1998
- Time Machine – Secret Oceans Part II – 1998
- Sagrado Coração da Terra – Ao Oeste do Sol, Oeste da Lua – 2000
- Rodrigo Alves – Suddenly – 2000
- Hamlet – William Shakespeare's Hamlet – 2001
- Holy Sagga – Planetude – 2001
- Karma – Into the Eyes – 2001
- Avantasia – (The Metal Opera) Parts I & II – 2001 / 2002
- Avalanch – Los Poetas Han Muerto – 2002
- Luca Turilli – Prophet of the Last Eclipse – 2002
- Dr. Sin – Ten Years Live – 2003
- AINA – Days of Rising Doom – 2004
- Korzus - Ties Of Blood - 2004
- Thalion – Another Sun – 2004
- Epica – Consign to Oblivion – 2005
- Eyes of Shiva – Deep – 2006
- Clairvoyants – Word to the Wise – 2008
- HDK – System Overload – 2009
- Corciolli – Lightwalk – 2009
- Avantasia – The Wicked Symphony – 2010
- Avantasia – The Flying Opera (live album) – 2011
- My Alley – Hope – 2011
- Trick or Treat – "Prince With 1000 Enemies" – 2012
- Empürios – Cyclings – 2013
- Ravenblack Project – Breaking Through the Mist – 2015
- Art X – The Redemption of Cain – 2016
- Soulspell – The Second Big Bang – 2017
- Soulspell – 10 Years of Soul – 2019
- Dune Hill – Song of Seikilos – 2020

== Filmography ==
- Andre Matos: Maestro do Rock – 2021
- Andre Matos: Maestro do Rock - Episode 2 – 2023

== Bibliography ==
- Andre Matos: O Maestro do Heavy Metal – 2020
