= Shaman (band) =

Brazilian power metal band

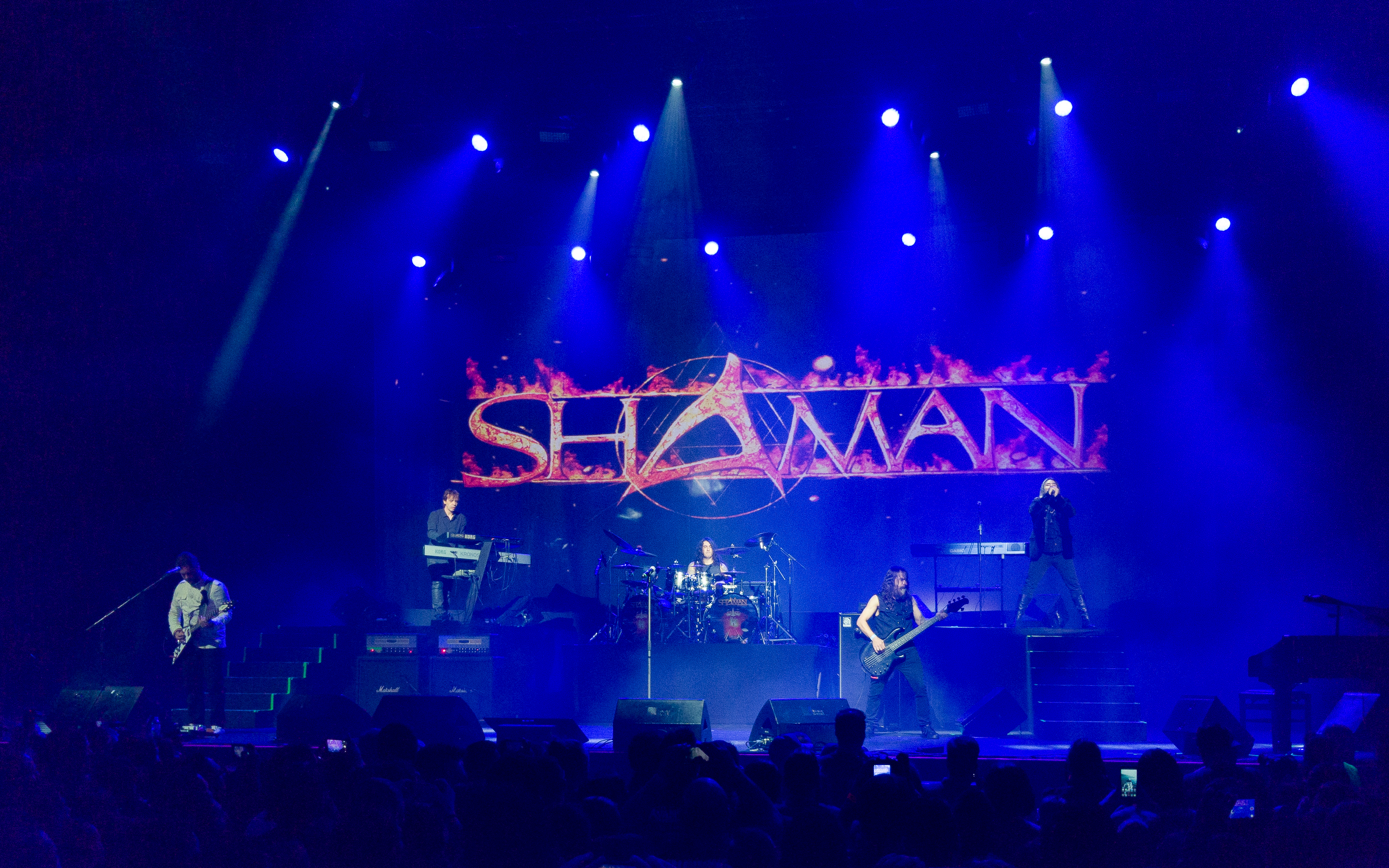
- Shaman live

Background information
- Also known as: Shaman (2000–2004, 2007–2014, 2018–2023); Shaaman (2005–2006)
- Origin: São Paulo, São Paulo, Brazil
- Genre: Progressive power metal
- Years active: 2000–2014; 2018–2023
- Label: Scarlet
- Spinoffs: Noturnall
- Spinoff of: Angra
- Past members: Andre Matos; Luis Mariutti; Hugo Mariutti; Fábio Ribeiro; Ricardo Confessori; Thiago Bianchi; Léo Mancini; Fernando Quesada; Junior Carelli; Alirio Netto

Shaman was a Brazilian progressive power metal band assembled in 2000 by three musicians who left the band Angra – Andre Matos, Luis Mariutti and Ricardo Confessori. The band was completed with guitar player Hugo Mariutti (Luis' younger brother – both of them also play in another band called Henceforth).

Shaman changed its name to Shaaman for legal reasons, but the issue was solved and they renamed it back to Shaman.

In October 2006, Andre Matos officially left the band along with the Mariutti brothers.

Confessori reformed the band with a new line-up featuring Thiago Bianchi on vocals, Léo Mancini on guitars, Fernando Quesada on bass and Junior Carelli on keyboards. They recorded two albums as Shaman and did the touring cycles before Confessori decided to leave the recordings of a third album in which the rest of the band decided to move on with Hangar and former Angra drummer Aquiles Priester and use the name Noturnall instead of Shaman.

On 29 June 2018, Shaman announced a reunion of their original lineup to tour in celebration of their 17th anniversary, which was interrupted with the unexpected death of the vocalist Andre Matos, on 8 June 2019.

== Biography ==
The band was formed in mid-2000, when musicians Andre Matos (vocals, keyboards, ex-Viper), Luis Mariutti (bass, ex-Firebox) and Ricardo Confessori (drums, ex-Korzus) left the band Angra. At the time the band was assembled, they did not have a guitarist, so Hugo Mariutti, formerly of Henceforth, was initially hired to assist in the compositions. Later they permanently integrated him into the band.

The name chosen for the band, Shaman, refers to the religious practice of shamanism, with the word "shaman" generally thought to be of Siberian origin.

They started an initial tour, which went through Europe and Latin America (specifically: France, Mexico, Argentina, Chile and Brazil). For live keyboards the band requested the help of musician Fábio Ribeiro (Blezqi Zatsaz, ex-Angra).

Mixing heavy metal, classical music and world music, the band started recording their debut album, entitled Ritual, in January 2002. The disc was entirely recorded in Germany, with the exception of a few tracks which were recorded in Brazil and the US. The production was managed by the producer Sascha Paeth, who also produced albums for Angra, Edguy, Rhapsody of Fire and Virgo and with co-production of Phil Colodetti.

Ritual was released in more than 15 countries. The World Ritual Tour lasted for one year and a half, touring in such places as: Brazil, Asia, Latin America and Europe. There were over 150 shows at that time, some presented twice in the same place.

During 2003, Shaman were among the first place slots for Brazil, with Ritual being awarded the best album of 2002 and 2004 by the readers of Folha de S. Paulo, a Brazilian newspaper. Later in 2004, the band opened for Iron Maiden's show in São Paulo, playing to an audience of over 45,000.

The band then recorded a live show in the Credicard Hall with the participation of several special guests such as Tobias Sammet, Marcus Viana, Andi Deris, Sascha Paeth, George Mouzayek and Michael Weikath. The show was then released on CD and DVD, entitled RituAlive in 2003. The engineering and mixing was done entirely at The Creative Studios in São Paulo, Brazil and the production was done by Phil Colodetti together with the Shaman members. According to director of Universal Music of Brazil, RituAlive is still the best DVD of its genre due to its quality and contents.

In 2005, with the second album almost completed and ready to release, they decided to rename the album to avoid a court hearing by another band. The band also decided to add an 'A' to its name as Shaaman. The name change occurred after another band named Shaman was consulted and specified that the meaning and pronunciation of the name were still the same.

In May 2005, the new album, entitled Reason, was released. Reason was mixed in Germany by the producer Sascha Paeth and recorded in Brazil by Phil Colodetti at Creative Studios. It attempted to return the feeling and spirit of 80s heavy metal. Their first single, named "Innocence" from the Reason was played on radio stations and further split the official charts of the highest-charting songs in Brazil. The video for the song also appeared on music TV channels.

Shaman then went on a hiatus which was confirmed on 12 October 2006, when a statement by bass player Luís Mariutti was released on the fansite For Tomorrow that "the band had called it a day."

Ricardo Confessori, the only remaining member of Shaman, decided to continue the band with a new line-up. Later, in 2007, the album Immortal, was released.

In 2013, all members but Confessori formed a new band called Noturnall. On a 2014 interview, guitarist Fernando Quesada confirmed none of the members would return to Shaman.

On 29 June 2018 Shaman announced a reunion of their original lineup to tour in celebration of their 17th anniversary with two shows in São Paulo. After some weeks, a tour was announced for Brasília, Belo Horizonte, Rio de Janeiro, Manaus, Fortaleza and Recife. They toured until 2 June 2019, with Avantasia.

The tour was interrupted with the unexpected death of the vocalist Andre Matos, on 8 June 2019.

== Line-up ==
Former members

- Andre Matos – vocals, piano, keyboards (2000–2006, 2018–2019; died 2019)
- Luis Mariutti – bass (2000–2006, 2018–2023)
- Hugo Mariutti – guitar (2000–2006, 2018–2023)
- Fábio Ribeiro – keyboards, piano (2000–2006, 2018–2022 as touring member, 2022–2023, as official member)
- Ricardo Confessori – drums (2000–2013, 2018–2023)
- Thiago Bianchi – vocals (2007–2013)
- Léo Mancini – guitars (2007–2013)
- Fernando Quesada – bass (2007–2013)
- Junior Carelli – keyboards, piano (2012–2013)
- Alirio Netto – vocals (2019–2023)

== Discography ==
Studio albums

- Ritual (2002) No. 101 French Charts # 80 Japanese Charts
- Reason (2005) # 200 Japanese Charts
- Immortal (2007)
- Origins (2010)
- Rescue (2022)

Demo albums

- Shaman (2001)

Live albums

- RituAlive (2003)
- AnimeAlive (2008)
- Live at Masters of Rock (2011)

Singles

- "Fairy Tale" (2002)
- "For Tomorrow" (2003)
- "Innocence" (2005)
- "Kurenai" (X Japan cover, 2009)

== Videography ==
Music videos

- "Fairy Tale" (2002)
- "For Tomorrow" (2003)
- "Innocence" (as Shaaman, 2005)
- "More" (as Shaaman, 2005)
- "In the Dark" (2007)
- "Finally Home" (2010)
- "Ego" (2011)
- "Nocturnal Human Side" (2013)
- "Brand New Me" (2020)
- "Turn Away (Live)" (2020)
- "Reason" (2020)

DVDs

- RituAlive (2003)
- Animelive (2008)
- Shaman & Orchestra – One Live (2011)

== See also ==
- Angra
- Sepultura
- Dr. Sin
