= Bravo (Dr. Sin album) =

Studio album by Dr. Sin
- Released: 2007
- Genre: Hard rock, progressive metal, heavy metal, progressive rock
- Length: 68:01
- Label: Century Media
- Producer: Andria Busic

Dr. Sin chronology
Listen to the Doctors (2005)	Bravo (2007)	Animal (2011)

Professional ratings
Review scores
Source	Rating
Whiplash.net	10/10 stars
Seigneurs Du Métal (french)	8.5/10 stars

Bravo is the seventh album by the hard rock band Dr. Sin. It was released in July 2007 by Century Media in Brazil.

== Track listing ==
No.	Title	Length
1.	"Drowning in Sin"	5:41
2.	"Nomad"	3:58
3.	"Empty World"	2:47
4.	"Freedom"	4:35
5.	"Behind Enemy Lies"	4:17
6.	"Taj Mahal"	0:45
7.	"Celebration Song"	5:07
8.	"Hail Caesar"	3:38
9.	"Signs"	4:28
10.	"C'est La Vie"	4:20
11.	"Dream Zone"	5:10
12.	"Life is Crazy"	5:34
13.	"Full Trotlle"	5:06
14.	"Wake Up Call"	5:31
15.	"Think it Over"	4:01
16.	"Welcome to the Show"	5:43

== Chart positions ==
Music	Year	Chart	Position
Think it Over	2009	Cash Box Rock Picks	1#

== Personnel ==
- Andria Busic – bass, lead vocals
- Ivan Busic – drums, backing vocals
- Eduardo Ardanuy – guitars

=== Special guests ===
- Gus Monsanto on the track Drowning in Sin.
- Hudson Cadorini on the track Think it Over.

== Notes ==
- Eric Martin (ex-Mr. Big) would do a special participation on the track Wake Up Call, but he couldn't come to Brazil in time to do the record.
