= Dr. Sin 10 Anos ao Vivo =

Live album by Dr. Sin
- Released: 2003
- Recorded: May 23 and 24, 2002
- Venue: SESC Ipiranga, São Paulo, Brazil
- Genre: Hard rock, heavy metal, progressive rock
- Label: Unimar/Paradoxx
- Producer: Dr. Sin

Dr. Sin chronology
Dr. Sin II (2000)	Dr. Sin 10 Anos ao Vivo (2003)	Listen to the Doctors (2005)

Professional ratings
Review scores
Source	Rating
Whiplash.net	link

Dr. Sin 10 Anos ao Vivo (English: Dr. Sin 10 Years Live) is the second live album and first DVD by Brazilian hard rock band Dr. Sin. It was recorded in May 23 and 24, 2002, at SESC Ipiranga in São Paulo, Brazil, and released in 2003 by Unimar/Paradoxx.

== Track listing ==
=== CD 1 ===
1. "Time After Time"
2. "Sometimes"
3. "Fly Away"
4. "Danger"
5. "Stone Cold Dead"
6. "Isolated"
7. "The Fire Burns Cold"
8. "Years Gone"
9. "Revolution"

=== CD 2 ===
1. "No Rules"
2. "Eternity"
3. "Living and Learning"
4. "Zero"
5. "Down in the Trenches (pt. I & II)
6. "Karma"
7. "Emotional Catastrophe"
8. "Futebol, mulher e Rock n' Roll"
9. "Fire" (feat. Andre Matos)

== Personnel ==
- Andria Busic - lead vocals, bass
- Ivan Busic - drums, backing vocals
- Edu Ardanuy - guitar

=== Special guests ===
- Marco Sergio - xarango
- Marcus Cezar - percussion
- Marcelo Souss - keyboards
- Andre Matos - vocals ("Fire")
