= Almah (band) =

Brazilian heavy metal band

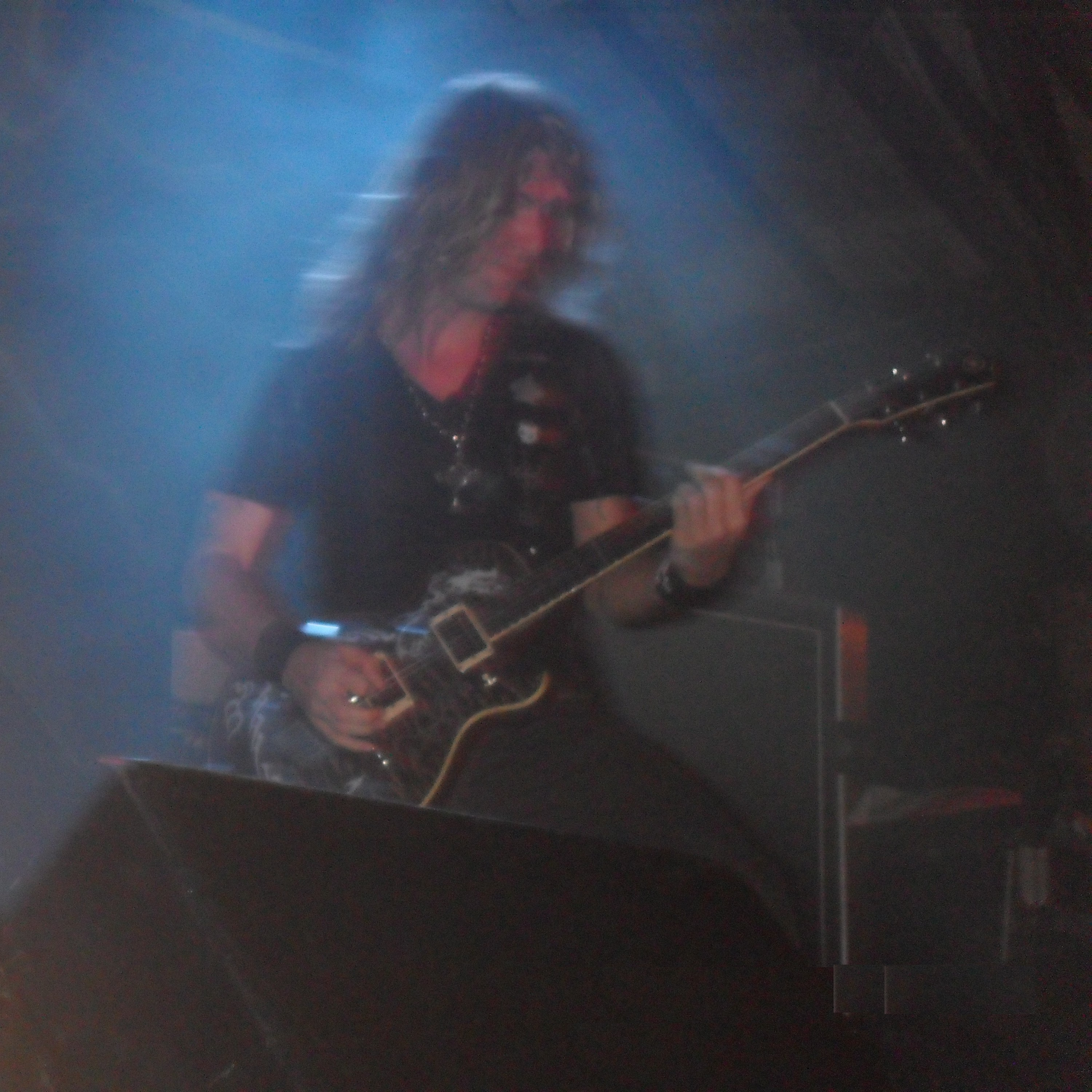
- Frontman Edu Falaschi performing in 2010

Background information
- Origin: São Paulo, Brazil
- Genres: Power metal, progressive metal, neoclassical metal
- Years active: 2006–present (on hold after 2016)
- Labels: AFM Records
- Members: Edu Falaschi; Marcelo Barbosa; Raphael Dafras; Diogo Mafra; Pedro Tinello
- Past members: Casey Grillo; Lauri Porra; Emppu Vuorinen; Felipe Andreoli; Paulo Schroeber; Gustavo di Padua; Marcelo Moreira

Almah was a Brazilian power metal band. Initially established in 2006 as a side project of former Angra singer Edu Falaschi, the band has released five albums and has turned from a solo-project into a band with regular activities. Almah plays internationally since 2008 and was featured in festivals such as Rock in Rio (2013) and ProgPower USA (015), among others.

== Band name ==
Edu Falaschi stated that he was looking for a band name that was easy to remember and pronounce in all languages. In Portuguese and Spanish, Alma means "soul". He discovered that in Hebrew, Almah (עלמה), with an "h", means virgin and purity. He also stated that many religious people say what it means is the opposite. "I decided to talk about human feelings in a whole album - and human feelings can be good and bad – like liberty like love ore we can feel like freedom we can feel envy and greed – bad feelings. That's how I decided to write about human feelings.

== Biography ==
The band's first album, Almah, was released in the second half of 2006. Besides singing, Edu Falaschi also produced the record, composed all the songs and wrote all the lyrics. The album was recorded in Finland and Brazil with musicians such as Emppu Vuorinen (guitars – Nightwish), Lauri Porra (bass – Stratovarius) and Casey Grillo (drums – Kamelot), and special guest appearances of Mike Stone (guitars – Queensrÿche), Edu Ardanuy (guitars – Dr. Sin) and Sizão Machado (bass – Tom Jobim, Chico Buarque and others), among others. The album received good reviews in rock magazines and websites worldwide. Falaschi was called one of the best singers by Burrn! magazine readers (Japan).

In June 2007, Angra took a break for two years and Falaschi concentrated on his work with Almah. The solo project turned into a band with a stable line-up.

Falaschi: "Angra really stopped in 2007 in July. And then when I released the first album, it was the solo album, I knew that maybe in the future Almah could be a band. And when Angra really stopped, we didn't know about Angra future and we didn’t know when we would come back with Angra. I decided in December 2007 to create a new Almah album, but as a real band, as a full time band."

Almah's second album, Fragile Equality, was released in October 2008. Besides Falaschi, who is handling the vocals, his Angra's bandmate Felipe Andreoli on bass has participated in the band. Guitar player Marcelo Barbosa from Khallice joined the band before its first tour in August 2007. During pre-production stage of Fragile Equality, drummer Marcelo Moreira and second guitarist Paulo Schroeber joined Almah. All members have contributed actively to the songwriting process of Fragile Equality, with Falaschi and Andreoli being responsible for the production as well. The album was at Norcal Studios in 2008. Fragile Equality's lyrical concept is about "the balance between all the elements of the universe" based on a book that Edu is the co-writer for. The book "Fragile Equality - Equinox-Book 1" (done in manga style) is to be released sometime later, with a karaoke CD of the Fragile Equality album.

In Brazil, the first pressing of the album was sold out during the first day of official sales. According to the magazine Roadie Crew the album became of the best-selling albums in Brazil. By the readers of Brazilian metal magazine, Roadie Crew and by the contributors of the Brazilian metal website Whiplash, and the Brazilian metal website Rock Underground Almah and Fragile Equality were recognized as the Best Brazilian Band 2008, the Best Album 2008, The Best Artwork 2008 among other nominations awarded to Almah musicians. The album was also well reviewed internationally.

A tour started in São Paulo in November 2008 and finished in April 2009 in Rio de Janeiro. In July and August 2008, Almah played on the main stage of musical festivals Píaui Pop and Porão Do Rock.

In January 2009, Almah launched the new video clip "Beyond Tomorrow". It was filmed in December 2008 in Brasília by Rodrigo Gianetto who works also for MTV Brazil. In March 2009, the band released its first digital single, an acoustic version of "All I Am", through its Brazilian Equality Fan Club.

Angra returned to activities in March 2009 but Almah announced the start of composing songs for the follow-up of Fragile Equality.

The band has since recorded and released three more albums; Motion (2011), Unfold (2013), and E.V.O (2016). They are currently on indefinite hiatus.

Paulo Schroeber left the band in 2012, due to health issues including an enlarged heart and accumulation of water in the lungs. He was required to use an artificial pacemaker-like device in his chest to breathe. On March 24, 2014, he died as a result of a surgery to reset the device gone wrong.

== Band members ==
Current members

- Edu Falaschi – vocals, keyboards, acoustic guitar (2006–present)
- Marcelo Barbosa – guitars (2007–present)
- Raphael Dafras – bass (2012–present)
- Diogo Mafra - guitars (2014–present)
- Pedro Tinello - drums (2015–present)

Former members

- Emppu Vuorinen – guitars (2006–2007)
- Lauri Porra – bass (2006–2007)
- Casey Grillo – drums (2006–2007)
- Felipe Andreoli – bass (2007–2012)
- Paulo Schroeber – guitars (2008–2012, died 2014)
- Gustavo Di Padua – guitars (2012–2013)
- Marcelo Moreira – drums (2008–2015)

Touring musicians

- Ian Bemolator – guitars (2011; 2013–2014)

Guest musicians

- Mike Stone – guitars
- Edu Ardanuy – guitars
- Rafael Bittencourt – guitars
- Demian Tiguez – guitars
- Tito Falaschi – bass
- Aquiles Priester – drums
- Fábio Laguna – keyboards

Timeline

== Discography ==
- Almah (2006, JVC/Laser/AFM) No. 165 Japanese charts
- Fragile Equality (2008, JVC/Laser/AFM) No. 188 Japanese Charts
- "You Take My Hand" (2008, Equality Fan Club) [single]
- "All I Am" (2009, Equality Fan Club) [single]
- Motion (2011)
- Unfold (2013)
- Within the Last Eleven Lines (2015) [compilation]
- E.V.O (2016)
