= Dr. Sin II =

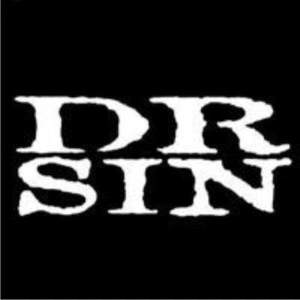

Studio album by Dr. Sin
- Released: 2000
- Genre: Hard rock, heavy metal, progressive rock

Dr. Sin chronology
Alive (1999)	Dr. Sin II (2000)	Ten Years Live (2003)

Professional ratings
Review scores
Source	Rating
Whiplash.net	(8/10)

Dr. Sin II is the fifth studio album by Brazilian hard rock band Dr. Sin, released in 2000. The power trio becomes now a quartet with Michael Vescera (ex- Obsession, MVP, Loudness and Yngwie Malmsteen) on the lead vocals.

== Track listing ==
No.	Title	Length
1.	"Time After Time"	6:50
2.	"Danger"	3:30
3.	"Gate of Madness"	3:19
4.	"Eternity"	4:53
5.	"Fly Away"	4:20
6.	"Miracles"	4:16
7.	"Same Old Story"	4:44
8.	"What Now"	4:31
9.	"Pain"	5:45
10.	"Devil Inside"	3:57
11.	"Suffocation"	3:46

== American and European version - Shadows of Light ==
Shadows of Light

Studio album by Dr. Sin
- Released: 2002
- Genre: Hard rock, heavy metal, progressive rock
- Label: Metal Mayhem Records
- Producer: Dr. Sin

Dr. Sin chronology
Alive (1999)	Shadows of Light (2002)	Ten Years Live (2003)

Professional ratings
Review scores
Source	Rating
Durp.com (the personnel is wrong)	5/5 stars

In Europe and the United States, the album was released in 2002 under the title of Shadows of Light. The differences were in the titles and the order of the songs.

== Track listing ==
No.	Title	Length
1.	"Time after time"	6:50
2.	"Miracle & dreams / Shadows of light"	4:16
3.	"Eternity"	4:53
4.	"What now"	4:31
5.	"A perfect crime"	3:57
6.	"Same old story"	4:44
7.	"Fly away"	4:20
8.	"Inside the pain"	5:45
9.	"Gates of madness"	3:19
10.	"Danger"	3:30
11.	"Suffocation"	3:46

== Personnel ==
- Michael Vescera - (Lead Vocals/Keyboards)
- Andria Busic – (Bass/Backing Vocals)
- Ivan Busic – (Drums/Backing Vocals)
- Eduardo Ardanuy – (Guitars)
- Joey Gross Brown - (Keyboards)

=== Special guests ===
- Serj Buss - on the track Same old Story
- Roland Grapow on the tack Time After Time (2nd guitar)
- Jason Himmelberger - Keyboards on the tracks Time After Time, What Now, Fly Away and Inside the Pain
