= Bušić =

Bušić is a Croatian surname. Notable people with the surname include:

- André Bušić (1939–1978), Croatian-Brazilian musician
- Andria Busic (born 1965), Brazilian bassist and vocalist
- Bruno Bušić, Croatian writer and dissident
- Ivan Bušić Roša (1745–1783), Croatian outlaw
- Ivan Busic (born 1967), Brazilian drummer
- Julienne Bušić (born 1948), American activist and airplane hijacker
- Tomislav Bušić (born 1986), Croatian footballer
- Vesna Bušić (born 1983), Croatian-German wrestler
- Zdravka Bušić (born 1950), Croatian politician
- Zvonko Bušić (1946–2013), Croatian emigrant and airplane hijacker
