= Alive (Dr. Sin album) =

Live album by Dr. Sin
- Released: 1999
- Recorded: Live tracks from 1997/1998 concerts around Brazil.
- Genres: Hard rock, heavy metal, progressive rock
- Length: 42:51
- Labels: Paradoxx Music; Unimar Music; Pony Canyon(Jap)
- Producers: Dr. Sin & Robson Stipancovich

Dr. Sin chronology
Live in Brazil (1997)	Alive (1999)	Dr. Sin II (2000)

Professional ratings
Review scores
Source	Rating
Whiplash.net	8/10 stars

Alive is an album by Brazilian hard rock band Dr. Sin. It was recorded during their 1997/1998 concert tour. This album contains 7 live tracks and 2 new studio tracks.

== Track listing ==
No.	Title	Length
1.	"Karma"	4:47
2.	"Isolated"	4:02
3.	"Down in the Trenches (Part. I e II)"	7:40
4.	"Sometimes"	5:05
5.	"Fire"	4:24
6.	"Emotional Catastrophe"	3:43
7.	"No Rules"	5:22
8.	"Experimental Dog (instrumental – studio)"	4:19
9.	"Free to Fly (studio)"	4:49

== Personnel ==
- Andria Busic – (Bass/Lead Vocals)
- Ivan Busic – (Drums/Backing Vocals)
- Eduardo Ardanuy – (Guitars)
