= Listen to the Doctors =

Studio album by Dr. Sin
- Released: December 2005
- Genre: Hard rock, heavy metal
- Length: 47:51
- Label: Trinity DC

Dr. Sin chronology
Ten Years Live (Live DVD/CD) (2003)	Listen to the Doctors (2005)	Bravo (2007)

Professional ratings
Review scores
Source	Rating
Whiplash.net	link

Listen to the Doctors is the sixth studio album release from the Hard rock band Dr. Sin. It is a cover album containing only songs that contain the word "Doctor" in their titles. Covered bands include Kiss, The Beatles, The Rolling Stones, Black Sabbath, Motörhead, and a jazz cover of Joe "King" Oliver.

== Track listing ==
1. "Calling Dr. Love" (Kiss) – 4:29
2. "Dr. Rock" (Motörhead) – 5:30
3. "Doctor Doctor" (UFO) – 3:19
4. "Dr. Feelgood" (Mötley Crüe) – 4:53
5. "Just what the Doctor Ordered" (Ted Nugent) – 2:36
6. "Dear Doctor" (The Rolling Stones) – 3:25
7. "The Doctor" (The Doobie Brothers) – 5:08
8. "I Don't Need no Doctor" (Ray Charles) – 2:34
9. "Rock 'n' Roll Doctor" (Black Sabbath) – 4:18
10. "Somebody Get me a Doctor" (Van Halen) – 2:50
11. "Doctor Robert" (The Beatles) – 3:28
12. "Doctor Jazz" (Joe "King" Oliver) – 5:21

== Personnel ==
- Andria Busic – (Bass/Vocals)
- Ivan Busic – (Drums/Backing Vocals)
- Eduardo Ardanuy – (Guitars)
