= Rockgol =

Brazilian television series

Rockgol was a television show aired by MTV Brasil, consisting of a football championship disputed by musicians. The show ran from 1995 to 2008, and later from 2011 to 2013, until the end of MTV Brasil. The matches were most famously "narrated" by comedians Paulo Bonfá and Marco Bianchi, with sarcastic and sometime off-game comments, and putting nicknames on most musicians.

== The championship ==
From 1995 to 2000, the tournament was disputed in single-elimination. After 2001, it followed the FIFA World Cup formula of 3 groups (named M, T and V after the network) followed by single-elimination semifinals\finals. The only exception was 2006, with only two groups.

The games occurred in São Paulo Athletic Club, São Paulo, except for 2000, when it happened in Rio de Janeiro. But the hosts say that the games happen in the small town of Birigui, SP, in the "Birigui Sports Arena" as a running joke.

Until 2002, the teams were chosen by the musicians themselves, but in that year the bands were sorted into teams. The names were also free to choose, before the ready names from 2003 on (in 2003, random names: the finals were Papas Fritas - french fries x Gafanhotos - locusts; in 2004, animal names: Aranhas Negras - black spiders- vs. Tamanduás - anteaters - finals; in 2005, diseases: Resfriados - colds- vs. Diabéticos -diabetics-; in 2006, fictional nations: Luxemburgo x Pirulândia; and in 2007, parodies of real clubs: Horríver Prata - River Plate - x Milanesa - A.C. Milan.

The biggest defeat was 0x17 in 1999, suffered by a team formed by Jota Quest, Sideral and Tianastácia.

The biggest Rockgol winner is three-times champion Fredi Endres, guitarist of Comunidade Nin-Jitsu, nicknamed by the hosts "Chernobyl" because of his bizarre haircut.

Only two persons participated in all tournaments: Ultraje a Rigor frontman Roger Moreira and Ratos de Porão guitarist Jão.

== The events ==
=== Rockgol 1995 ===
- Winner: Skank
- Runner-up: Barão Vermelho
- Venue: São Paulo Athletic Club

=== Rockgol 1996 ===
- Winner: Sr. Banana
- Runner-up: Raimundos
- Third: Skank
- Venue: São Paulo Athletic Club

=== Rockgol 1997 ===
- Winner: Cidade Negra, Gabriel o Pensador, Toni Platão
- Second: Barão Vermelho, Blitz
- Third: Sr. Banana, Resist Control
- Fourth: Ultraje a Rigor, Dr. Sin
- Venue: São Paulo Athletic Club

=== Rockgol 1998 ===
- Winner: O Rappa, Devotos Do Ódio
- Second: Dado e o Reino Animal, Cidade Negra
- Third: Claudinho e Buchecha, Os Morenos
- Fourth: Skank, Ivo Meirelles & Funk N'Lata, Baia Rock Boys, Black Maria.
- Venue: São Paulo Athletic Club

=== Rockgol 1999 ===
- Winner: Skank, Dread Lion, Baia Rock Boys
- Second: Barão Negro e o Reino Animal (Barão Vermelho, Cidade Negra, Dado e o Reino Animal)
- Venue: São Paulo Athletic Club

=== Rockgol 2000 ===
- Winner: Claudinho & Buchecha, Os Morenos
- Second: Skank, Dread Lion
- Venue: Estádio da Gávea

=== Rockgol 2001 ===
- Winner: M.S.T. (Cidade Negra, Só Pra Contrariar)
- Second: Skank, Dread Lion
- Venue: São Paulo Athletic Club

=== Rockgol 2002 ===
- Campeã: Comunidade Natidanja (Comunidade Nin-Jitsu, Natiruts, Daniel Carlomagno, Jairzinho)
- Second: Rockers F.C. (CPM 22, Vinny, Tihuana)
- Third: Ranca Toco F.C. (Sepultura, Falamansa, Simoninha, LS Jack)
- Fourth: Os Comédia (Supla, Charlie Brown Jr.)
- Venue: São Paulo Athletic Club

=== Rockgol 2003 ===
- Winner: Papas Fritas (Comunidade Nin-Jitsu, Natiruts, Kiko Zambianchi)
- Second: Gafanhotos (Pedro Luís e a Parede, Rappin' Hood, Simoninha, Otto, Ratos de Porão)
- Third: Arsênico (O Surto, Detonautas)
- Fourth: XV de Quatorze (Devotos, Tihuana, Raimundos)
- Venue: São Paulo Athletic Club

=== Rockgol 2004 ===
- Winner: Aranhas Negras (Br'oz, Shaaman, Felipe Dylon, Rappin' Hood)
- Second: Tamanduá (Orbitais, Dread Lion, Kiko Zambianchi, Sonic Júnior)
- Third: Cães Sarnentos (Nação Zumbi, CPM 22, LS Jack)
- Fourth: Amebas (Vinny, B5, Supla, Natiruts)
- Venue: São Paulo Athletic Club

=== Rockgol 2005 ===
- Winner: Resfriados (Br'oz, Helião, Korzus, Supla).
- Second: Diabéticos (Sepultura, Kiko Zambianchi, Dibob, Samambaia)
- Third: Catapora (Banda Catedral, Devotos, Pedro Luis e a Parede, Felipe Dylon).
- Fourth: Frieiras (Dead Fish, Rappin' Hood, CPM 22).
- Venue: São Paulo Athletic Club ("Monumental de Birigui")

=== Rockgol 2006 ===
- Winner: Luxemburgo (CPM 22, Forgotten Boys, Comunidade Nin-Jitsu, Relespública, Xis, Leandro Sapucahy, Marcelo D2)
- Second: Reino da Pirulândia (Supla, Massacration, Falamansa, Sonic Júnior)
- Third: Estados Unidos da Peperônia (Shaaman, Planta & Raiz, Johnny MC, Rappin' Hood, Gabriel, O Pensador, Ultraje a Rigor, Lucas Santtana)
- Fourth: República da Riváldia (Dead Fish, Ultramen, Ratos de Porão, Simoninha)
- Venue: São Paulo Athletic Club ("Venue Mané Pipoca")

=== Rockgol 2007 ===
- Winner: Horríver Prata (Forfun, Nação Zumbi, Maldita, Sapienza)
- Second: Milanesa (DMN, Acústicos e Valvulados, Banzé, Dibob, CPM 22)
- Third: Fenerbafo (Skank, Trêmula, Léo Maia, Andre Matos e Banda)
- Fourth: Once Pêssegos em Caldas (Fresno, Strike, Natiruts, Faces do Subúrbio)
- Venue:São Paulo Athletic Club ("Venue Mané Pipoca")

=== Rockgol 2008 ===
- Winner: Forfun Soccer Camp (Forfun, Zefirina Bomba, Rock Rocket, Leela, Forgotten Boys e Simoninha)
- Second:Sport Clube Supla Paulista (Supla, Mombojó, Matanza, Ludov)
- Third:Fresno De Pelotas F.C. (Fresno, Strike, Maldita, Marvin, Devotos, Faces do Subúrbio)
- Fourth:CPM 22 de Novembro de Piracicaba (CPM 22, Andre Matos e Banda, Catedral, Carbona)
- Venue: Conjunto Desportivo Constâncio Vaz GuimarãesReynaldo Gianecchini, (Reynaldão)

=== Rockgol 2011 ===
- Winner: Skank (Skank, Tihuana, Sabonetes, Emicida, Toni Platão)
- Second: Fresno (Fresno, Mombojó, Martin e Eduardo, Devotos do Ódio)
- Third: CPM 22 (CPM 22, Restart, Dibob, Comunidade Nin-Jitsu, Davi Moraes)
- Fourth: Nasi (Nasi, Detonautas Roque Clube, Scracho, Simoninha, Macaco Bong)
- Venue: Arena dos Prazeres (Pleasure Arena or Prazerzão) - Morro dos Prazeres (RJ)

=== Rockgol 2013 ===
- Winner: CPM 22 (CPM 22, Sabonetes, Rancore, Esteban).
- Second: Fresno (Fresno, ConeCrew Diretoria, Matanza, Comunidade Nin-Jitsu, Supla).
- Third: Forfun (Forfun, Vivendo do Ócio, Natiruts, Projota, Devotos do Ódio).
- Fourth: NX Zero (NX Zero, Mombojó, Tihuana, Gabriel o Pensador).
- Venue: Venue Jack Marin, (Parque da Aclimação, a park close to the centre of São Paulo)
