= Almah (album) =

Studio album by Almah
- Released: 2006
- Genre: Progressive metal, power metal, neoclassical metal
- Length: 42:05, 49:35 (with bonus tracks)
- Label: Rock Brigade/Laser Company
- Producer: Edu Falaschi

Almah chronology
Almah (2006)	Fragile Equality (2008)

Almah is the debut album of Almah, a solo project of Brazilian heavy metal singer and former Angra frontman Edu Falaschi. The lyrics are about the different feelings of the human being and the title phonetically means "soul" in the Portuguese language. It was released in 2006, with Falaschi touring to promote the album in Brazil along with former Symbols members Tito Falaschi (his brother) and Demian Tiguez.

== Track listing ==
1. "King" - 4:10
2. "Take Back Your Spell" - 3:15
3. "Forgotten Land" - 4:08
4. "Scary Zone" - 4:23
5. "Children of Lies" - 4:36
6. "Break All the Welds" - 2:14
7. "Golden Empire" - 3:52
8. "Primitive Chaos" - 3:15
9. "Breathe" - 3:07
10. "Box of Illusion" - 3:32
11. "Almah" - 5:33
12. "The Sign of Glory" (bonus track) - 4:09
13. "Supermind" (bonus track) - 3:21

== Personnel ==
- Edu Falaschi (Angra) – vocals, guitar and keyboard
- Emppu Vuorinen (Nightwish) – guitar
- Lauri Porra (Stratovarius) – bass
- Casey Grillo (Kamelot) – drums

=== Guest musicians ===
- Mike Stone (Queensrÿche) – guitar
- Edu Ardanuy (Dr. Sin) – guitar
- Fábio Laguna (Angra) – keyboards

=== Live ===
- Edu Falaschi – vocals, guitar
- Edu Ardanuy – guitar
- Tito Falaschi – bass
- Adriano Daga – drums

== Charts ==
Chart (2006)	Peak position
Oricon weekly chart	165
