= Nós Vamos Invadir sua Praia =

Studio album by Ultraje a Rigor
- Released: September 1985
- Recorded: March – May 1985
- Genre: Rock, punk rock, new wave, rockabilly
- Length: 38:30
- Label: Warner
- Producer: Liminha and Pena Schmidt

Ultraje a Rigor chronology
| Eu me amo/Rebelde sem causa [Single] (1984) | Nós Vamos Invadir sua Praia (1985) | Sexo!! (1987) |

Nós Vamos Invadir sua Praia (transl. We Are Going to Invade Your Beach) is the debut album by the Brazilian rock band Ultraje a Rigor, released in 1985.

The sound is a mixture of new wave, punk rock, rockabilly and ska, with humorous subjects. Its title (which translates as "We Are Going to Invade Your Beach") alludes to the fact that they were a band from São Paulo trying to be successful in the coastline city of Rio de Janeiro.

In 2010, the album was released in 180 gram Vinyl, by the Record label Polysom.

== Track listing ==
All songs were written by Roger Rocha Moreira except where noted:

=== Original ===
1. "Nós Vamos Invadir Sua Praia" ("We're Gonna Invade Your Beach") - 4:18
2. "Rebelde Sem Causa" ("Rebel Without a Cause") - 3:23
3. "Mim Quer Tocar" ("Me Want to Play") - 3:48
4. "Zoraide" - 3:25
5. "Ciúme" ("Jealousy") - 4:09
6. "Inútil" ("Useless") - 3:37
7. "Marylou" (Roger Rocha Moreira/Edgard Scandurra/Maurício) - 2:16
8. "Jesse Go" (Roger Rocha Moreira/Maurício) - 3:51
9. "Eu Me Amo" ("I Love Myself") – 3:34
10. "Se Você Sabia" ("If You Knew") – 3:37
11. "Independente Futebol Clube" ("Independent Football Club") - 2:35

=== 2001 Limited Edition ===
12. "Inútil" (1983 single version) - 2:51
13. "Mim Quer Tocar" (B-side from "Inútil") - 3:03
14. "Hino dos Cafajestes" (Single) (Roger Rocha Moreira/Maurício) - 2:58
15. "Marylou" (Carnival version) - 2:24
16. "Ricota" (Unreleased) (Edgard Scandurra) - 3:08

== Reception ==
Professional ratings
Review scores
| Source | Rating |
|---|---|
| Allmusic | 4.5/5 stars |

The album was very well received. On Allmusic.com, the album received 4.5 stars (out of 5.0). Eduardo Rivadavia stated: "São Paulo's Ultraje a Rigor became known for their honest, straightforward rock & roll and easygoing sense of humor. Given the local rock scene's relative immaturity, the formula worked to perfection, making their 1985 debut album Nós vamos Invadir sua Praia (We're Going to Invade Your Beach) the first platinum-certified release by that generation of up-and-coming rock bands". (...) "Simple but effective, to modern listeners, Brazilian or not, Nós vamos Invadir sua Praia is bound to sound archaic and perhaps even hopelessly basic, but in the context of history, it helped birth Brazilian rock & roll into its golden era."

It was listed by Rolling Stone Brazil as one of the 100 best Brazilian albums in history. The magazine also voted the song "Inútil" as the 23rd greatest Brazilian song.

== Certifications ==
| Region | Certification | Certified units/sales |
|---|---|---|
| Brazil (Pro-Música Brasil) | Platinum | 250,000^{*} |
^{*} Sales figures based on certification alone.
