= E.V.O (album) =

Studio album by Almah
- Released: 22 September 2016
- Recorded: 2015–2016
- Genre: Power metal; progressive metal
- Length: 51:20
- Label: Test Your Metal

Almah chronology
Unfold (2013)	E.V.O (2016)

E.V.O is the fifth studio album by Brazilian power metal band Almah released on 22 September 2016. It is their first album with drummer Pedro Tinello.

== Track listing ==
1. "Age of Aquarius" – 7:16
2. "Speranza" – 4:55
3. "The Brotherhood" – 4:41
4. "Innocence" – 4:35
5. "Higher" – 5:06
6. "Infatuated" – 4:05
7. "Pleased to Meet You" – 4:24
8. "Final Warning" – 4:13
9. "Indigo" – 3:46
10. "Corporate War" – 4:19
11. "Capital Punishment" – 4:00

== Personnel ==
- Edu Falaschi – vocals, guitars, keyboards
- Marcelo Barbosa – guitars
- Diogo Mafra – guitars
- Raphael Dafras – bass
- Pedro Tinello – drums
