= Paulo Schroeber =

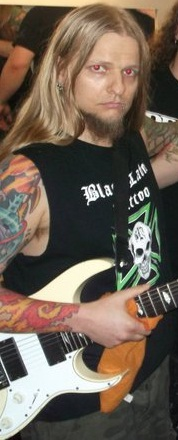

Background information
- Born: August 18, 1973; Caxias do Sul, Rio Grande do Sul, Brazil
- Died: March 24, 2014 (aged 40); Caxias do Sul, Rio Grande do Sul, Brazil
- Genres: Power metal, progressive metal, industrial metal, melodic death metal, heavy metal, jazz fusion
- Occupation: Musician
- Instrument(s): Guitar, classical guitar
- Website: www.pauloschroeber.com

Paulo Schroeber (August 18, 1973 – March 24, 2014) was a Brazilian guitarist, most known for his work with Almah. He was also in the bands Astafix, Hammer 67, Burning in Hell and Fear Ritual.

== Early years ==
Paulo was born in Caxias do Sul, Brazil to Carmen Acco and German immigrant Ildefonso Schroeber. He had his first contact with music at the age of 14, his father gave him a classical guitar at that time and thereafter he began to attend music lessons.

When he turned 18, he abandoned his academic studies to focus on music, and then he studied classical guitar for three years. Already at an early age his passion for classical music was evident, playing songs by Heitor Villa-Lobos, Bach and Julio Salvador Sagreras. His fascination with guitarists such as Jason Becker, Marty Friedman and Steve Morse was of equal size, because along with the classical guitar, Paulo studied electric guitar, but this instrument was self-taught.

== Career ==
With his first band, Fear Ritual of melodic death metal, he released a Split CD by Wild Rags Records in Los Angeles, achieving good reception in the United States.

Paulo also participated for a short period of time in bands like Burning Hell and Predator, having recorded tracks with them, as well as having participated in a number of compositions. Moreover, with the band Fall Up, he had more than two hundred concerts in the state of Rio Grande do Sul, worked as a side man for various artists in the region, also recorded and produced some discs.

With Naja, released an album recorded by Trident label, and a DVD, a band who won the prize Independent Revelation and the prize Açorianos, by the prefecture of Porto Alegre, the best performer in the category. Along with its activities, Paulo has always worked with teaching private lessons and classes in the main schools of the region, having as its brightest students names as Cassio and Daniel Vianna Suliani (Abomination).

He's now working on his rock/metal project entitled Hammer 67, that released their first CD entitled Mental Illness in 2009, together with the band, recorded the music video for the song 1984.

In 2011, Paulo released his first solo instrumental album Freak Songs, which comprises a variety of genres, such as rock, metal and jazz fusion. In the same year, he returned to Fear Ritual and worked on the new album of the band, set to be released in 2012.

== Almah and Astafix ==
With Almah, which has Edu Falaschi and previously Felipe Andreoli, both members of Angra at that time, released the CD entitled Fragile Equality, earning the title of best album of Heavy Metal in basically all especialized Brazilian media outlets and also being very well accepted throughout the world. With Almah he has travelled nearly all of Brazil on tour. In addition to Almah, Paulo works in four projects, like Astafix, which launched its first album entitled Endever recently, winning the title as early first-band revelation in Brazilian magazine specializing in the genre, Roadie Crew. Currently the band is on tour in Brazil, playing in renowned festivals such as Palco do Rock in Salvador, has performed in Southern Brazil, Chile, and Argentina. The album was very well accepted by the specialized media, as a result the band has often appeared in several TV shows and magazines in Brazil. In addition the band has released their second video Desordem e Retrocesso (Disorder and Regression) and its first live DVD Live in São Paulo. The "Endever Tour" in Europe and the United States took place in 2011.

== Departure from Almah ==
As stated on the band's official website, Schroeber has left the group: "Unfortunately, a very serious heart problem made it impossible for our friend to continue his work for a long term, and we received his message that he had to leave the band! All of us became extremely sad but at the same moment we respect his decision to stay with his family at such a delicate moment." – Edu Falaschi

== Death ==
Paulo Schroeber died on March 24, 2014, after an unsuccessful surgery to reset an artificial pacemaker-like device he carried in his chest.

== Influences ==
His influences range from rock to jazz and fusion, to metal in all its forms and variations, without prejudice or radicalism.

A few of his favorite musicians are Andrés Segovia, Paco de Lucia, John McLaughlin, Al Di Meola, Tony Iommi, Angus Young, Frank Gambale and Allan Holdsworth.

== Discography ==
Discography source: Instrumental solo album:

- Freak Songs – 2011

With Almah:

- Fragile Equality – 2008
- Motion – 2011

With Astafix:

- End Ever – 2009
- Live in São Paulo – 2011

With Hammer 67:

- Mental Illness – 2009

With Fall Up:

- Demo Atlântida 9 Anos

With Fear Ritual:

- Fear Ritual

With Naja:

- Naja – 2004
- Ao vivo – 2005
- Aliança Rebelde Tributo
