= Brutal (Dr. Sin album) =

Album by Dr. Sin

Studio album by Dr. Sin
- Released: 1995
- Genre: Hard rock, heavy metal, progressive rock
- Length: 51:17
- Label: Laser Company/Unimar Music
- Producer: Dr. Sin and Johnny Montagnese

Dr. Sin chronology
Dr. Sin (1993)	Brutal (1995)	Insinity (1997)

Brutal is the second studio album by Brazilian hard rock band Dr. Sin, released in 1995. With this album, Dr. Sin opened for such bands as Bon Jovi, AC/DC, Joe Satriani and Steve Vai.

== Track listing ==
No.	Title	Length
1.	"Silent Scream"	3:57
2.	"Karma"	3:29
3.	"Isolated"	3:54
4.	"Down in the Trenches"	4:05
5.	"Down in the Trenches (pt. II)"	2:10
6.	"Fire"	3:37
7.	"Inner Voices"	3:18
8.	"Child of Sin"	4:02
9.	"Hey You"	4:52
10.	"Kizumba"	1:04
11.	"Someone to Blame"	4:30
12.	"Third World"	5:15
13.	"Shed Your Skin"	3:30
14.	"Years Gone"	2:39
15.	"War"	3:35

== Japanese Version - Silent Scream ==
Silent Scream

Studio album by Dr. Sin
- Released: 1996
- Genre: Hard rock, heavy metal, progressive rock
- Length: 58:07
- Label: Pony Canyon
- Producer: Dr. Sin e Johnny Montagnese

Dr. Sin chronology
Dr. Sin (1993)	Silent Scream (1996)	Insinity (1997)

In Japan, the album was released in 1996 under the title of Silent Scream. The differences was in the order of the track listing, with one bonus song ("Futebol, Mulher E Rock n' Roll").

== Track listing ==
No.	Title	Length
1.	"Isolated"	3:53
2.	"Silent Scream"	3:54
3.	"Someone to Blame"	4:28
4.	"Inner Voices"	3:17
5.	"War"	3:33
6.	"Years Gone"	2:39
7.	"Down in the Trenches"	4:05
8.	"Kizumba"	1:04
9.	"Fire"	3:35
10.	"Karma"	3:25
11.	"Child of Sin"	4:00
12.	"Third World"	5:14
13.	"Shed Your Skin"	3:29
14.	"Hey You"	4:49
15.	"Down in the Trenches (Part II)"	2:21
16.	"Futebol, Mulher E Rock'N Roll (Soccer, Woman and Rock n' Roll)"	4:21
