= Unfold (Almah album) =

Studio album by Almah
- Released: 25 November 2013
- Genre: Neoclassical metal; power metal; progressive metal
- Length: 62:52
- Label: Scarlet

Almah chronology
Motion (2011)	Unfold (2013)	E.V.O (2016)

Professional ratings
Review scores
Source	Rating
Collectors Room	8/10
Dead Rhetoric	9/10

Unfold is the fourth studio album by Brazilian power metal band Almah released on 25 November 2013.

== Track listing ==
1. "In My Sleep" – 4:16
2. "Beware the Stroke" – 5:32
3. "The Hostage" – 4:01
4. "Warm Wind" – 4:58
5. "Raise the Sun" – 5:06
6. "Cannibals in Suits" – 4:59
7. "Wings of Revolution" – 4:47
8. "Believer" – 5:39
9. "I Do" – 5:06
10. "You Gotta Stand" – 5:04
11. "Treasure of the Gods" – 9:44
12. "Farewell" – 3:40

== Personnel ==
- Edu Falaschi – vocals, guitars, keyboards
- Marcelo Barbosa – guitars
- Gustavo Di Pádua – guitars
- Raphael Dafras – bass guitar
- Marcelo Moreira – drums
