= Marcelo Barbosa =

Brazilian guitarist & music teacher (born 1975)

Marcelo Silva Barbosa
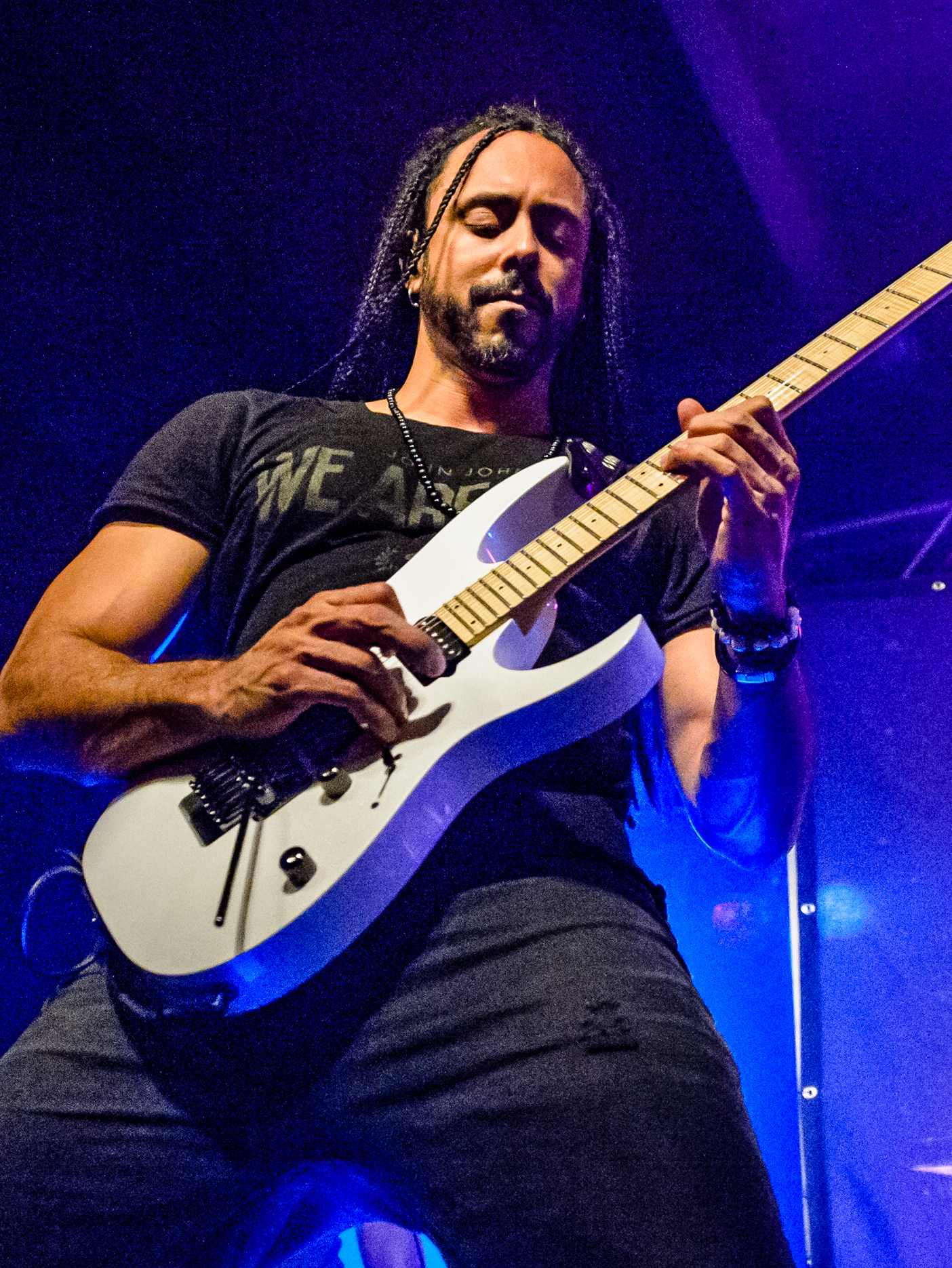

Background information
- Born: April 7, 1975 (age 51)
- Genres: Power metal; speed metal; progressive metal
- Occupation: Guitarist
- Member of: Angra; Khallice; Almah

Marcelo Silva Barbosa (Portuguese: [baʁˈbɔzɐ]; born April 7, 1975) is a Brazilian guitarist and music teacher. He is a founder or member of other Brazilian bands like progressive metal act Khallice and former Angra vocalist Edu Falaschi's band Almah. He also is the founder and owner of GTR music school in his home city Brasília, and columnist of Cover Guitarra, Guitar Class and Guitar Player magazines. Since September 2015, he also joined Angra, replacing Kiko Loureiro, who left to join Megadeth.

== Biography ==
Barbosa began playing electric guitar when he was 11 years old. He was studying with several teachers, mainly with Allan Marshall. At 17 years old he already was a professional musician and a musical teacher in two musical schools in his home city Brasília. He then decided to establish his own one, focused on the electric guitar. Besides organizing work and managing other teachers, Barbosa established his own entire approach instead of copying or adapting any already existed one and he wrote all the didactic material.

Barbosa also attended classes and workshops of musicians like Greg Howe, Lula Galvão, Hélio Delmiro, Toninho Horta, Guinga, Ian Guest among others. In 2002 he finished summer courses in the famous Berklee College of Music. As a result he was chosen with other 11 students to receive a scholarship for the college's regular course. However, it was not possible to continue due to GTR and his other responsibilities.

Some time before that Barbosa became a member of Brasília pop rock band Zero10. They released an EP and a full-length album Novo Dia and they play almost every week at different venues of the capital of Brazil. Later on, he would restart the band Khallice, which played the progressive metal he always liked.

In September 2007, Barbosa was invited to join the band Almah formed by some members of Angra and he went into a national tour with the band. By spring 2008 the line-up of Almah was finally established. In the end of April 2008 the recording of new Almah album Fragile Equality started at Norcal studios (São Paulo) and finished in July 2008.

Barbosa writes articles for important guitar magazines in Brazil like Guitar Class, Cover Guitarra and Guitar Player. Some time ago Barbosa wrote a book about technique to the "Toque de Mestre" series, published by HMP.

Barbosa is endorsed by Ibanez, Elixir Strings, Nig pedals and Ibox. On Expomusic 2006 (a big musical exhibition in São Paulo) one of the most important guitar brands in Brazilian market TAGIMA released new MB-1, the guitar designed with Barbosa's specifications, which belongs to the select team of "Signature Series" of the company.

== GTR ==
Nowadays his institute GTR is one of the biggest guitar schools in Latin America. GTR have already graduated over 4.000 students, with more than 600 people studying in two different units of GTR (Asa Norte and Asa Sul). Besides electric guitar, there are the courses of vocals, acoustic guitar, production, musical business and others. A number of events are frequently organized by GTR like festivals and workshops with musicians like Sidney Carvalho, Kiko Loureiro, Edu Ardanuy among others. To its 10th anniversary, GTR released a special 14 tracks CD recorded by some of the most prominent teachers.

Marcelo Barbosa (guitars): GTR is a project I've worked already for twelve years at. It began like a guitar Institute but now we have classes for bassists, vocalists and acoustic guitar players too. I’m responsible for all the didactic material of the guitar course and we have more than six hundred students in three schools. Four years ago I decided to franchise GTR and some people got interested and now we have three schools in Brasília. (...) It is relatively big. We have many students and it’s growing up year by year. We try to teach music, not only one specific style or genre. Rock, Metal, Jazz, Country and Brazilian music is some of the approaches here.

== Discography ==
=== Solo ===
- Marcelo Barbosa (2008, compilation, demo)

=== With Khallice ===
- Prophecy (1996, demo)
- The Journey (2003, Hellion Records)
- The Journey (2006, Magna Carta) – re-release + bonus Stuck
- Inside Your Head (2008)

=== With Almah ===
- Fragile Equality (2008, AFM Records, Laser, JVC)
- Motion (2011, AFM Records)
- Unfold (2013)
- E.V.O (2016)

=== With Zero10 ===
- Novodia
- Zero10

=== With Angra ===
- Ømni (2018)
- Cycles Of Pain (2023)

=== Compilations with Marcelo Barbosa ===
- Brazilian Great Music 2 (2007, Elixir Endorsers' compilation)
- GTR 10 Anos
- BMU 2005
- Guitarras Do Cerrado
- Metal do Cerrado
