= Crescendo (album) =

Studio album by Ultraje a Rigor
- Released: 1989
- Genre: Rock

Ultraje a Rigor chronology
Sexo!! (1987)	Crescendo (1989)	Por que Ultraje a Rigor? (1990)

Crescendo is the third album by the Brazilian rock band Ultraje a Rigor, released in 1989 on vinyl, LP, album.

The album was created after years of touring. After initial success, media coverage of the album fell off. One of the more popular songs on the album, Filha da Puta created controversy by including swear words after official censorship ended although the song was still censored on TV shows and radio stations causing difficulties in promoting the album. Similar actions were directed at the songs "Volta Comigo" and "O Chiclete".

== Track listing ==
1. "Crescendo" ("Growing Up")
2. "Filha da Puta" ("Son of a Bitch")
3. "Volta Comigo" ("Get Back with Me")
4. "Laços de Família" ("Family Bonds")
5. "Secretários Eletrônicos" ("Answering Machines")
6. "Maquininha" ("Little Machines")
7. "Ricota" ("Ricotta")
8. "A Constituinte" ("The Constituent")
9. "Crescendo II - A Missão" ("Growing Up II - The Mission")
10. "Ice Bucket"
11. "Coragem" ("Courage")
12. "Os cães ladram (mas não mordem) e a caravana passa" ("Dogs bark (but don't bite) and the caravan goes on")
13. "Querida Mamãe" ("Dear Mom")
14. "O Chiclete" ("The Bubblegum")
