= Live! Tonight! Sold Out!! =

Nirvana: Live! Tonight! Sold Out!!

Video by Nirvana
- Released: November 15, 1994 (VHS, LaserDisc); November 7, 2006 (DVD)
- Recorded: 1990–1993
- Genres: Grunge, alternative rock
- Length: 83:00
- Label: Geffen Records
- Director: Kevin Kerslake

Nirvana chronology
| Nirvana: Live! Tonight! Sold Out!! (1994) | Classic Albums: Nirvana – Nevermind (2005) |

Nirvana: Live! Tonight! Sold Out!! is a live video by the American rock band Nirvana, directed by Kevin Kerslake, and released on November 15, 1994, on VHS and laserdisc. It was re-released on DVD on November 7, 2006.

== Background ==
Conceived by vocalist and guitarist Kurt Cobain, the film was intended to document Nirvana's unexpected rise to fame following the release of their second album, Nevermind, in September 1991. After Cobain's death in April 1994, it was salvaged for release by surviving Nirvana members Dave Grohl and Krist Novoselic, who completed it with editor Steve MacCorkle.

Kerslake, who had been in communication with Cobain during the film's development, revealed that Cobain's concept for the video was "much more evolved" than the version that was released, featuring "more of an interior sense of what it was like to be in the band", but "obviously, we never got to the point where that part was shot."

== Content ==
The video includes live performances, as well as interview clips, news footage and the band's home movies. The live material is drawn largely from the band's 1991 Nevermind tour, with their shows at the Paramount Theatre in Seattle, Washington, on October 31, 1991, and Paradiso in Amsterdam, Netherlands, on November 25, 1991, featured most prominently. This tour is also represented by appearances on the British music show Top of the Pops on November 27, 1991, and the British talk show Tonight with Jonathan Ross on December 6, 1991.

It also includes footage from the band's Pacific Rim tour in early 1992. One song, "On a Plain", is from their headlining appearance at the Roskilde Festival in Roskilde, Denmark on June 26, 1992, which had an attendance of 64,500 people in the audience. One song, "Lithium", as well as other footage, is from the band's headline performance at the Reading Festival in Reading, England on August 30, 1992, which, according to Nirvana drummer Dave Grohl, had an attendance of 50,000 people and that hearing the audience chant the lyrics to "Lithium" was one of their biggest moments. Two songs are from Nirvana's headline appearance at the Hollywood Rock festival in Rio de Janeiro, Brazil on January 23, 1993, which had an attendance of over 100,000 people in the audience.

Three of the songs "Aneurysm", "Love Buzz" and "Territorial Pissings" are edits of two different versions each, with the Paradiso, Amsterdam version being used as one of the two versions for all three songs. The first part of "Love Buzz" is taken from a concert at Trees in Dallas, Texas, in which frontman Kurt Cobain got into a fight with a bouncer.

The "Aneurysm" edit, which features the Paradiso and Hollywood Rock versions of the song, was used as a music video for promotion of Live! Tonight! Sold Out!! in 1994, but also for promotion of the band's 1996 live compilation, From the Muddy Banks of the Wishkah. Although it was actually a different version of the song that appeared on the From the Muddy Banks of the Wishkah album that was recorded at Del Mar Fairgrounds in Del Mar, California, on December 28, 1991.

Recording locations of Live! Tonight! Sold Out!!
Live! Tonight! Sold Out!! (the United States)
Live! Tonight! Sold Out!! (Northern and Central Europe)

In 2002, an unsent letter to "Kevin & co" was published in Cobain's Journals, which contained numerous requests for changes to an earlier cut of the film, none of which appear in the final version. Among Cobain's instructions were the inclusion of the song "Sifting", from the band's show at Rhino Records in Los Angeles on June 23, 1989, and "Molly's Lips", from their appearance at the 1991 Reading Festival on August 23, 1991.

== Reception ==
Allmusic's Greg Prato wrote that the film showed "how great the trio could be on stage", and offered "great insight into the group, just as they were hitting it big." Charles Aaron of Spin wrote that it captured "the dizzying silliness of the times, as well as Nirvana's fractious magnetism." According to Noah Davis of PopMatters, the film showed that despite the band's "position as world beaters", they were rarely serious, and "never played along" to the traditional rules of fame. Dan Martin of the NME wrote that it showed "Nirvana as they should have been experienced: a raw, visceral, devastatingly sexy way of life."

== Chart performance ==
The original 1994 release of Live! Tonight! Sold Out!! peaked at number 6 on the Billboard Top Video Sales chart, and at number 1 on the Billboard Top Music Videos chart. In the United Kingdom, it peaked at number 2 on the UK Top Music Videos chart.

== Track listing ==
1. "Aneurysm" (In two parts: 1991.11.25 - Paradiso, Amsterdam, Holland, and 1993.01.23 - Hollywood Rock, Rio de Janeiro, Brazil. Incorrectly labeled 1993.01.16 São Paulo, Brazil on inlay)
2. "About a Girl" (1991.10.31 - Paramount Theatre, Seattle, Washington)
3. "Dive" (1993.01.23 - Hollywood Rock, Rio de Janeiro, Brazil. Incorrectly labeled 1993.01.16 - São Paulo, Brazil on inlay)
4. "Love Buzz" (In two parts: 1991.10.19 - Dallas, Texas / 1991.11.25 - Paradiso, Amsterdam, Holland)
5. "Breed" (1991.10.31 - Paramount Theatre, Seattle, Washington)
6. "Smells Like Teen Spirit" (1991.11.27 - UK TV show Top of the Pops)
7. "Negative Creep" (1992.02.22 - Honolulu, Hawaii)
8. "Come as You Are" (1991.11.25 - Paradiso, Amsterdam, Holland)
9. "Territorial Pissings" (In two parts: 1991.12.06 - UK TV show Jonathan Ross / 1991.11.25 - Paradiso, Amsterdam, Holland)
10. "Something in the Way" (1992.02.14 - Osaka, Japan)
11. "Lithium" (1992.08.30 - Reading Festival, England)
12. "Drain You" (1991.11.25 - Paradiso, Amsterdam, Holland)
13. "Polly" (1991.10.31 - Paramount Theatre, Seattle, Washington)
14. "Sliver" (1991.11.25 - Paradiso, Amsterdam, Holland)
15. "On a Plain" (1992.06.26 - Roskilde Festival, Denmark)
16. "Endless, Nameless" (1991.10.31 - Paramount Theatre, Seattle, Washington) (Not listed on VHS release)
- "Lounge Act" from Nevermind plays over the ending credits.
- Numerous other fragments appear throughout the video, including pieces of the band's 1992 performance on Saturday Night Live. An audio clip of the outro of a live performance of the song "Rape Me" that was recorded at the Seattle Center Coliseum on September 11, 1992, plays over a collage of other footage.

=== DVD bonus tracks ===
The DVD features the same track listing as the VHS release, as well as footage from Nirvana's performance at the Paradiso Club in Amsterdam on November 25, 1991, featuring the songs:

1. "School"
2. "About a Girl"
3. "Been a Son"
4. "On a Plain"
5. "Blew"

There is also a secret "easter egg" bonus feature at the end of the credits, a rehearsal of "On a Plain" from early 1991.

== Charts ==
=== Weekly charts ===
==== 1994 original VHS release ====
| Chart (1994–1995) | Peak position |
|---|---|
| Australia Music Video Top 20 (ARIA) | 1 |
| Italy Music Videos (Musica e dischi) | 2 |
| UK Videos (OCC) | 9 |
| UK Music Videos (Official Charts) | 2 |
| US Top Video Sales (Billboard) | 6 |
| US Top Music Videos (Billboard) | 1 |

==== 2006 DVD re-release ====
| Chart (2006) | Peak position |
|---|---|
| Australian Audiovisual Top 40 Chart (ARIA Charts) | 9 |
| Italian Music DVD (FIMI) | 5 |
| UK Music Videos (Official Charts) | 11 |
| US Top Music Videos (Billboard) | 4 |

=== Year-end charts ===
| Chart (1995) | Peak position |
|---|---|
| Australia Music Video Top 20 (ARIA) | 1 |

== Certifications ==
| Region | Certification | Certified units/sales |
|---|---|---|
| Argentina (CAPIF) | Platinum | 8,000^{^} |
| Australia (ARIA) | Platinum | 15,000^{^} |
| Canada (Music Canada) | 2× Platinum | 20,000^{^} |
| New Zealand (RMNZ) | Platinum | 5,000^{^} |
| United Kingdom (BPI) | 2× Platinum | 100,000^{*} |
| United States (RIAA) | 3× Platinum | 300,000^{^} |
^{*} Sales figures based on certification alone.^{^} Shipments figures based on certification alone.

== See also ==
- Nirvana discography
- Nirvana bootleg recordings
