= Motion (Almah album) =

Studio album by Almah
- Released: 16 September 2011
- Studio: Norcal Studios, São Paulo
- Genre: Heavy metal; power metal; progressive metal; thrash metal
- Length: 44:30
- Label: AFM
- Producer: Brendan Duffey

Almah chronology
Fragile Equality (2008)	Motion (2011)	Unfold (2013)

Professional ratings
Review scores
Source	Rating
AllMusic	3.5/5 stars
Metal.de	7/10

Motion is the third studio album by Brazilian power metal band Almah, released on 16 September 2011 in Brazil and in October 2011 worldwide. A music video was made for the song "Late Night in '85".

== Track listing ==
1. "Hypnotized" – 5:16
2. "Living and Drifting" – 4:01
3. "Days of the New" – 4:38
4. "Bullets on the Altar" – 4:32
5. "Zombies Dictator" – 4:39
6. "Trace of Trait" – 4:25
7. "Soul Alight" – 4:19
8. "Late Night in '85" – 3:44
9. "Daydream Lucidity" – 5:12
10. "When and Why" – 3:44
11. "Get a Wish" (Japanese bonus track) – 3:33

== Personnel ==
- Edu Falaschi – vocals, keyboards
- Felipe Andreoli – bass, keyboards on "Daydream Lucidity"
- Marcelo Barbosa – guitars
- Paulo Schroeber – guitars
- Marcelo Moreira – drums

=== Guests ===
- Tito Falaschi – additional keyboards
- Victor Cutrale – vocals on "Zombies Dictator"
- Thiago Bianchi (Shaman) – vocals on "Daydream Lucidity"
- Edu Cominato – additional vocals on "Hypnotized" and "Days of the New"
