= Morro dos Prazeres =

Human settlement in Brazil

Morro dos Prazeres - "Hill of Pleasures" - is a favela in the Southern Zone, the Zona Sul of the Brazilian metropolis Rio de Janeiro. It is part of the quarter Santa Teresa, which is roughly 2.5 km northeast. It is usually considered pacified, although recent events saw murders by gunshot of two tourists who inadvertently wandered into the community. "" Settlement of the Morro dos Prazeres began in 1940 and the census of 2010 suggested a population of 2136 people. The mountain, respectively hill, the favela is named after has an altitude of 275 metres.

The name is a tribute to Mother Maria dos Prazeres, who held masses on the base of the hill, an area where once was a chapel. These days there is an apartment block.

Morro dos Prazeres is part of the statistical unit Escondidinho / Prazeres.

Community	Residences
Vila Elza	317	131
Rua Projetada A	521	211
Vila Anchieta	854	286
Morro do Escondidinho	1,758	599
Morro dos Prazeres	2,136	643
Total	5,586	1,870
Instituto Pereira Passos - IBGE, Censo Demográfico (2010).

The favela has gained increased visibility after its use as a location of the 2008 movie Elite Squad (Tropa de Elite) and as the venue of Rockgol, a football event starring musicians staged by MTV, in 2011.

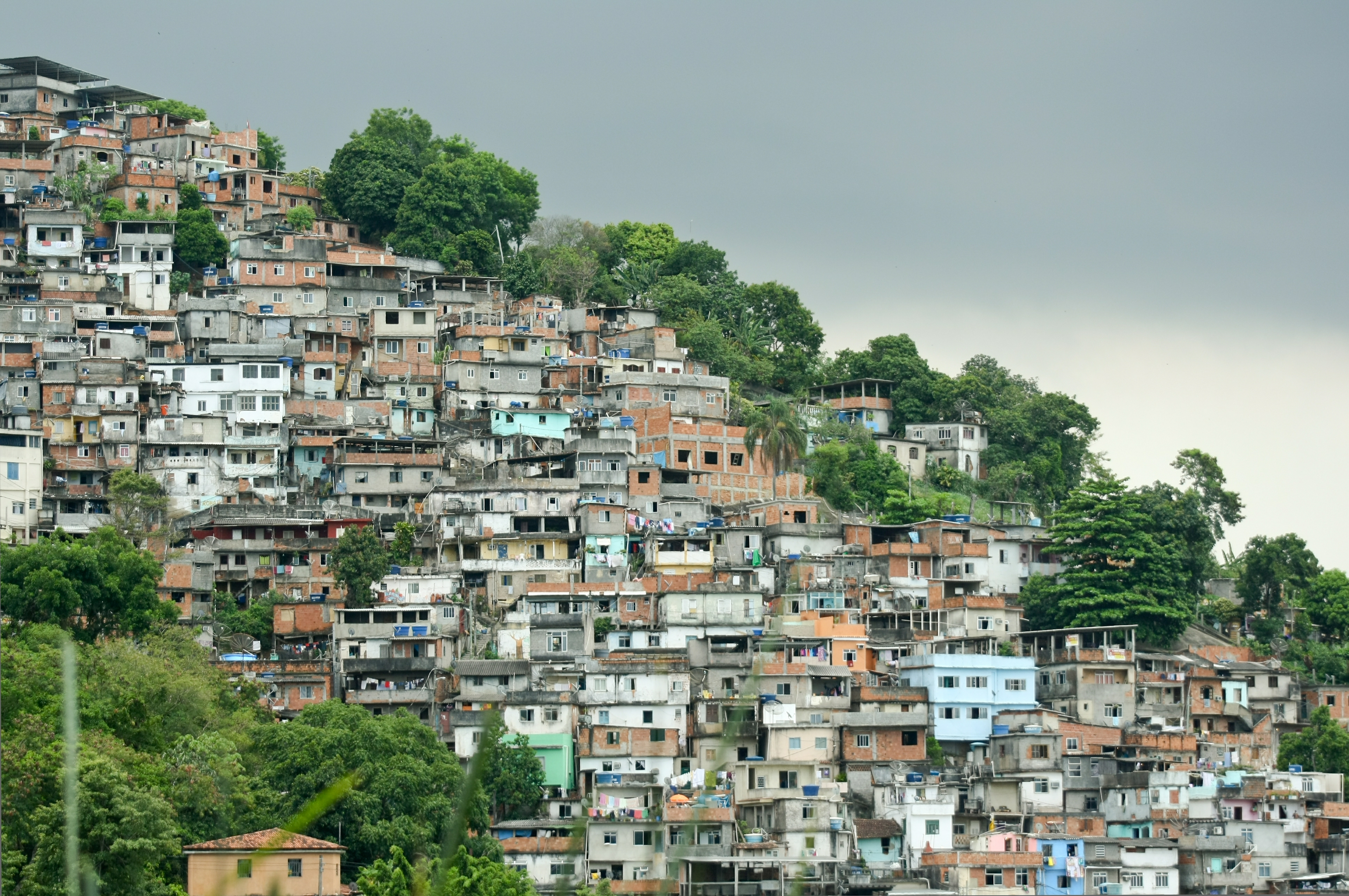
Morro dos Prazeres

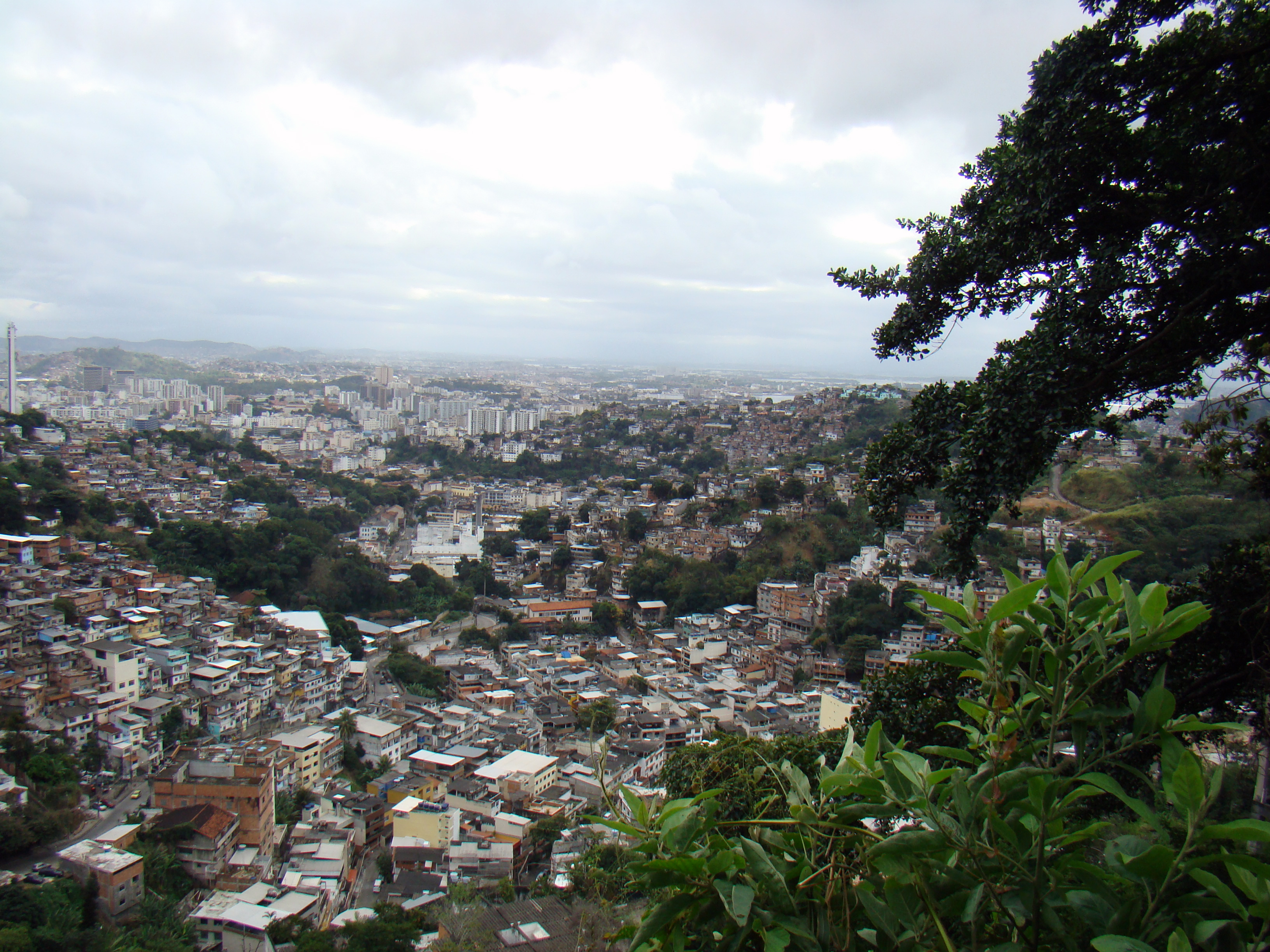
View from Morro dos Prazeres

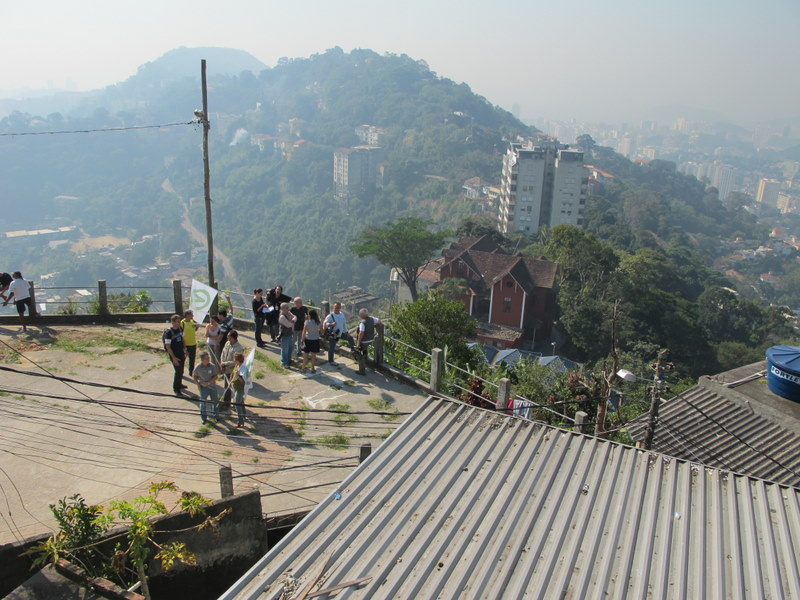
In Morro dos Prazeres

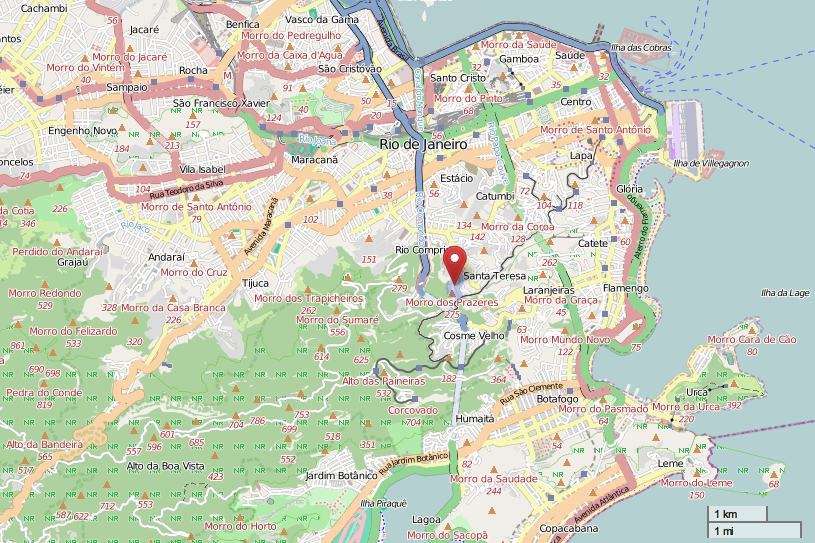
Map of Morro dos Prazeres
