= Casa das Máquinas =

Brazilian rock band

Casa das Máquinas (English: Machine House) is a Brazilian rock band, formed in the 1970s.

== History ==
The band was formed by Luiz Franco Thomaz, known as Netinho, member of the Os Incríveis who were looking for a sound that was less commercial and more up-to-date for their time. Their first album, Casa das Maquinas, was patterned after hard rock music while their next album, Lar de Maravilhas, adopted a more progressive style. Their third album, Casa de Rock, returned to their original style, going back to basic rock. After a nearly 30 years hiatus, the band decided to regroup in 2022.

== Members ==
=== Current members ===
- Luiz Franco Thomaz (Netinho) – drums and percussion
- Mário Franco Thomaz (Marinho) – drums and vocals
- Andria Busic – Bass and lead vocals
- Faíska – Guitar
- Mário Testoni Jr. – organ, keyboard and piano

=== Past members ===
- José Aroldo Binda – guitar and vocals
- Carlos da Silva – bass guitar and vocals
- Carlos Roberto Piazzoli – guitar, organ, bass
- Maria José – vocals

== Discography ==
- 1974 – Casa das Máquinas
- 1975 – Lar de Maravilhas
- 1976 – Casa de Rock
- 1978 – Ao Vivo em Santos (bootleg)
- 2000 – Pérolas (collection)
- 2022 – Brilho nos Olhos
