= André Busic =

Brazilian jazz trumpeter

- Born: Croatia
- Children: Andria Busic; Ivan Busic; Musical career
- Genre: Jazz
- Instrument: Trumpet
- Formerly of: Traditional Jazz Band; Blue Gang

André Busic is a Brazilian jazz trumpeter of Croatian origin. He participated in bands such as Traditional Jazz Band and Blue Gang, and is the father of Andria Busic and Ivan Busic.
