= Fragile Equality =

Studio album by Almah
- Released: October 2008
- Genres: Progressive metal, power metal, neoclassical metal
- Length: 47:05
- Language: English
- Label: AFM Records

Almah chronology
Almah (2006)	Fragile Equality (2008)	Motion (2011)

Professional ratings
Review scores
Source	Rating
About.com	4/5 stars

Fragile Equality is the second studio album by Brazilian power metal band Almah released in October 2008.

== Track listing ==
No.	Title	Music	Length
1.	"Birds of Prey"	Falaschi, Schroeber	4:45
2.	"Beyond Tomorrow"	Andreoli, Falaschi	4:03
3.	"Magic Flame"	Andreoli, Barbosa, Falaschi, Moreira	3:32
4.	"All I Am"	Andreoli, Falaschi	4:40
5.	"You'll Understand"	Andreoli, Falaschi, Moreira	6:03
6.	"Invisible Cage"	Falaschi, Schroeber	5:46
7.	"Fragile Equality"	Andreoli, Falaschi	3:48
8.	"Torn"	Andreoli, Falaschi	4:42
9.	"Shade of My Soul"	Andreoli, Falaschi	4:58
10.	"Meaningless World"	Andreoli, Falaschi	4:48
Total length:			47:05

== Personnel ==
- Edu Falaschi - vocals
- Felipe Andreoli - bass
- Marcelo Barbosa - guitar
- Paulo Schroeber - guitar
- Marcelo Moreira - drums

== Charts ==
Chart (2008)	Peak position
Oricon weekly chart	188
