= Sexo!! =

Sexo

Studio album by Ultraje a Rigor
- Released: 1987
- Genre: Hard rock, new wave, rockabilly, punk rock

Ultraje a Rigor chronology
Liberdade para Marylou (1986)	Sexo (1987)	Crescendo (1989)

Sexo (stylized as Sexo!!) is the second album by the Brazilian rock band Ultraje a Rigor, released in 1987.

== Track listing ==
1. "Eu Gosto de Mulher" ("I Like Women")
2. "Dênis, o quê você quer ser quando crescer?" ("Dênis, what do you want to be when you grow up?")
3. "Terceiro" ("Third")
4. "A Festa" ("The Party")
5. "Prisioneiro" ("Prisoner")
6. "Sexo!!" ("Sex!!")
7. "Pelado" ("Naked")
8. "Ponto de ônibus" ("Bus Stop")
9. "Maximillian Sheldon"
10. "Will Robinson e seus Robots" ("Will Robinson and his Robots")

== Personnel ==
- Roger Rocha Moreira – lead vocals and guitar.
- Carlo Bartolini (Carlinhos) – guitar
- Sérgio Serra – guitar
- Maurício Defendi – bass guitar
- Leôspa – drums

== Certifications ==
Country	Certification	Date	Sales threshold
Brazil - ABPD	Platinum	1994	250.000
