= Ivan Busic =

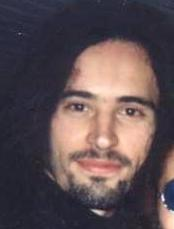

Background information
- Born: February 15, 1967 (age 59)
- Origin: São Paulo, São Paulo, Brazil
- Genres: Hard rock, heavy metal, progressive rock, jazz fusion
- Occupations: Drummer, Musician, Songwriter, Producer
- Instruments: drums, vocals
- Years active: 1984 - present
- Labels: Baratos Afins(1984–1988), Rock Brigade(1987), WEA(1989–1994), Laser Company(1995–1997), Paradoxx Music(1997–1999 and 2003), Century Media (2005 - present days)

Ivan Busic Neto (born February 15, 1967, in São Paulo, Brazil) is a Brazilian drummer who has worked with such bands as Dr. Sin, Ultraje a Rigor, Taffo, Supla and Eduardo Araújo. Almost all his works, he worked with his brother Andria.

== Biography ==
Ivan Busic was born into a musical family. Since a child, Ivan admired the career of his Croatian immigrant father, André Busic, who played in two jazz bands: Traditional Jazz Band and Blue Gang. He had a desire to learn and followed his father to concerts. Thus he gained influences of jazz, blues, country and rock.

At an early 17 years of age, he joined up with his brother Andria (b/v), Daril Parisi(g) and formed a rock band, that called Prisma. Later, Sergio Semam joined on band, and the band changed the name to Platina. In 1985, they released with Baratos Afins their first album. After two years, the Platina dissolved.

In 1987, Ivan joined a band A Chave do Sol, with: Rubens Gióia (g), Roberto Cruz (g/v) e Luis "Tigueis" Antônio (b). They recorded the first album called The Key. The vinyl contained on side A, music only in English, and on side B in Portuguese. This was released by Rock Brigade Records.

After some time stopped, they decided to return to Platina, and in 1988, with another name: Slogan that soon after were changed to Cherokee. With another formation, with Renato Nunes on the guitar, the album were released by Baratos Afins again. Soon after, Cherokee dissolved.

In 1989, Wander Taffo, one of the most famous brazilian guitarist, invited the Busic Brothers, to record the album Taffo, with specials participations of famous artists in Brazil, such as Herbert Vianna, Lulu Santos and Lobão. The cd were recorded at Nas Nuvens Studio(RJ) and mixed in Los Angeles (United States). The cd were released by WEA in 1989. The band made several appearances in television and received many prizes.
In 1991, the 2nd album was released: Rosa Branca which had much success. Taffo was one of the best and most famous bands in Brazil at that time.

The band played in New York City, on Limelight and Cat Club, concerts that were recorded by American MTV and then transmitted to many countries. In 1992, the Taffo's band was dissolved.

In 1993, the Busic Brothers met Edu Ardanuy, and they were side men of the popularity Brazilian singer Supla, where they released the cd Encoleirado by Sony BMG. After many trips and shows, they left Supla and formed the Dr. Sin (band who they are in present days).

With Dr. Sin, Ivan played at many rock festivals, such as Hollywood Rock, Phillips Monsters of Rock, M2000 Summer Concerts, Skol Rock and Live n' Louder.

In 2007, Dr. Sin released the cd Bravo (Century Media/Dynamo Records), that is doing success in Brazil. The new CD (Bravo) will be released worldwide soon.

Currently, Ivan is considered one of the best drummers in Brazil.

== Discography ==
- Platina - Platina (1986).
- The Key - A Chave do Sol (1987).
- Pegando Fogo - Cherokee (1988).
- Wander Taffo - Taffo (1989).
- Rosa Branca - Taffo (1991).
- Encoleirado - Supla (1992)
- Dr. Sin - Dr. Sin (1993)
- Brutal / Silent Scream - Dr. Sin (1995)
- Insinity - Dr. Sin (1997)
- Alive - Dr. Sin (1999)
- Dr. Sin II / Shadows of Light - Dr. Sin (2000)
- 10 Years Live (Cd/DvD) - Dr. Sin (2003)
- Listen to the Doctors - Dr. Sin (2005)
- Bravo - Dr. Sin (2007)
