= Andria Busic =

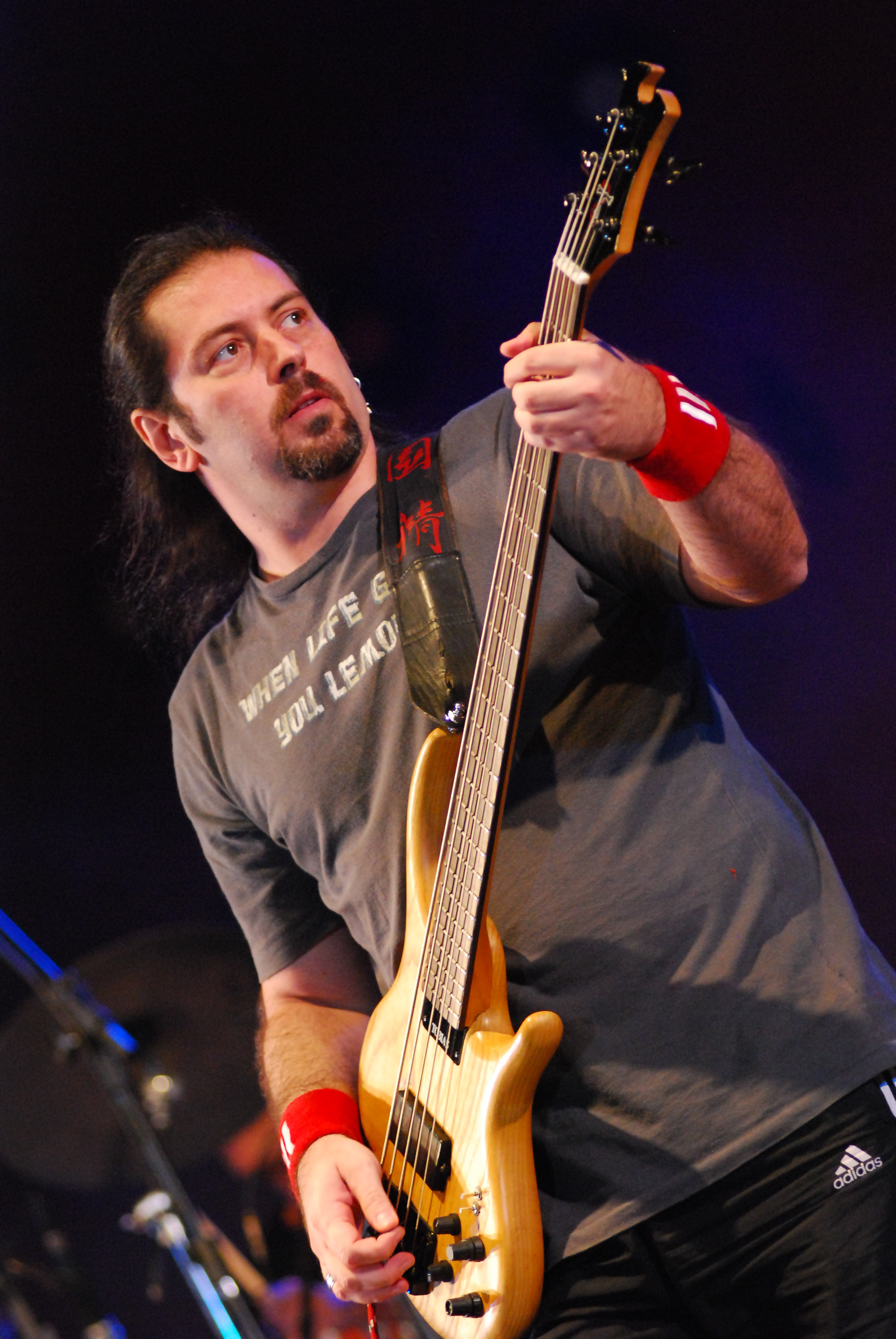

Background information
- Born: October 9, 1965 (age 60); São Paulo, São Paulo, Brazil
- Genres: Hard rock, heavy metal, progressive rock
- Occupation(s): Bassist, musician, songwriter, producer
- Instrument(s): Bass, vocals
- Years active: 1984–present
- Labels: Baratos Afins (1984–1988), WEA (1989–1994), Laser Company (1995–1997), Paradoxx Music (1997–1999 and 2003), Century Media (2005 – present days)

Andria Busic (born October 9, 1965) is a Brazilian bassist/vocalist who has worked with such bands as Dr. Sin, Ultraje a Rigor, Taffo, Supla and Eduardo Araújo.

== Biography ==
In 1970 when Andria and his brother Ivan Busic had started to become interested in Rock 'n Roll, inspired by their father, the famous jazz trumpeter André Busic, who formed the Traditional Jazz Band. Beyond bands such as Beatles, Rush, Led Zeppelin, Black Sabbath, Deep Purple, at Busic's house, they heard many different music styles, like jazz, blues and country, so they began to study their respective instruments.

In 1984 the Busic Brothers former the band called Prisma, a name that soon after would be changed to Platina, played hard rock in Portuguese. They recorded their first LP by Baratos Afins (label), with this formation: Sérgio Semam (vocal), Daril Parisi (guitar), Ivan Busic (drums) and Andria Busic (bass and back vocals).

After some time, they decided return with Platina, and in 1988, with another name: Slogan that soon after was changed to Cherokee. With another formation, with Renato Nunes on the guitar, the album was released by Baratos Afins again. Soon after, it dissolved.

Andria entered quickly in one of the most famous Brazilian rock bands, called Ultraje a Rigor, where he recorded the CD Crescendo, and did a special participation on the CD Por quê Ultraje?.

In the same year, Wander Taffo, one of the most famous Brazilian guitarists, invited the Busic Brothers to record the album Taffo, with specials participations of famous artists in Brazil, such as Herbert Vianna, Lulu Santos and Lobão. The CD was recorded at Nas Nuvens Studio (RJ) and mixed in Los Angeles (United States). The CD was released by WEA.

In 1989 the second album: Rosa Branca was released to much success. In 1992 the Taffo's band was dissolved.

In 1993, the Busic Brothers met Edu Ardanuy, and they were side men of the popular Brazilian singer Supla, where they released the CD Encoleirado by Sony BMG. After many trips and shows, they left Supla and formed the Dr. Sin band which they are in presently.

With Dr. Sin, Andria played at many rock festivals, such as Hollywood Rock, Phillips Monsters of Rock Brazil, M2000 Summer Concerts, Skol Rock and Live n' Louder.

In 2007, Dr. Sin released the CD Bravo (Century Media/Dynamo Records), that is successful in Brazil. Bravo will be released worldwide soon.

In 2008, Andria Busic joined in Casa das Máquinas (parallel of Dr. Sin), one of the most important rock bands in Brazil.

Currently, Andria is considered one of the best singers and bassist in Brazil.

== Discography ==
- Platina - Platina (1986).
- Pegando Fogo - Cherokee (1988).
- Crescendo - Ultraje a Rigor (1989).
- Wander Taffo - Taffo (1989).
- Rosa Branca - Taffo (1991).
- Encoleirado - Supla (1992)
- Dr. Sin - Dr. Sin (1993)
- Brutal / Silent Scream - Dr. Sin (1995)
- Insinity - Dr. Sin (1997)
- Alive - Dr. Sin (1999)
- Dr. Sin II / Shadows of Light - Dr. Sin (2000)
- 10 Years Live - Dr. Sin (2003)
- Listen to the Doctors - Dr. Sin (2005)
- Bravo - Dr. Sin (2007)
- Sunrise - Eduardo Lira (2015)
- The First Concept Project - Eduardo Lira (2017)

== See also ==
- Dr. Sin
- Taffo
- Edu Ardanuy
- Ivan Busic

== Participações ==
- Eduardo Lira - Sunrise "The Fist Concept Project" (2015)
