= Hollywood Rock =

Brazilian rock music festival

- Genre: Rock music
- Dates: 3 days in January
- Locations: São Paulo and Rio de Janeiro in Brazil
- Years active: 1988, 1990, 1992-1996
- Founders: Souza Cruz tobacco company

Hollywood Rock was a music festival which took place in São Paulo and Rio de Janeiro in Brazil, from 1988 to 1996, featuring both Brazilian and international acts. The festival was sponsored and organised by the Souza Cruz tobacco company, owners of the Hollywood cigarette brand, taking its name from an unrelated festival that occurred in 1975 with an all-Brazilian lineup. After a law was passed by the Senate of Brazil prohibiting tobacco and alcohol companies from sponsoring cultural and sporting events, the festival was cancelled. The festival did not happen in 1989 or 1991 (the latter because of Rock in Rio 2 happening at around the same time in Rio de Janeiro).

== Origins ==
A festival named Hollywood Rock happened at Botafogo's stadium in Rio de Janeiro and featured performances by Raul Seixas, Rita Lee, O Terço, Vímana, Celly Campelo and Erasmo Carlos, among others. The festival was spearheaded by Nelson Motta, who later on conceded its name rights to Souza Cruz.

== 1988 ==
The first edition of Hollywood Rock took place in January 1988, with four nights of concerts in each city. The venues for the festival were the Morumbi stadium in São Paulo and the Apoteose Square (the final section of the Sambadrome) in Rio de Janeiro. The headliners for this edition were Supertramp, The Pretenders, Duran Duran and Simple Minds. However, Simply Red, who opened the concert for Duran Duran, was generally considered by press and fans the breakthrough performance of the whole festival, leading them to come back for the 1993 edition, this time boasting headliner status.

UB 40, who opened the concert for Simple Minds, also met enthusiastic response from the crowds. The British reggae band distinguished itself as well by receiving a host of guests onstage, like late singer Robert Palmer, Pretenders's leader Chrissie Hynde (who performed live her famous duet with UB 40's Ali Campbell in Sonny Bono's "I Got You Babe") and Brazilian band Paralamas do Sucesso, who had played previously the same night.

The night before, UB 40 had taken part in the Pretenders' concert encore, also performing "I Got You Babe". The Pretenders' line-up for the festival featured guitarist Johnny Marr, of The Smiths' fame.

The other Brazilian acts featured in the bill for the four-night event (from the next edition on, it would be shortened for three nights only) were Ira!, Titãs, Ultraje a Rigor, Lulu Santos and Marina Lima. As for the non-Brazilian acts, they were all touring the country for the first time.

== 1990 ==
The second Hollywood Rock festival took place from 25th to 27 January 1990, at the same venues as the first edition. The international attractions for this edition of the festival were Bob Dylan, Bon Jovi, Tears for Fears, Terence Trent D'Arby, Eurythmics and Marillion. Terence Trent D'Arby headlined one night in São Paulo only, while Tears for Fears had the same privilege solely in Rio. Bob Dylan and Bon Jovi had headliner status in both cities. As in the first edition, all six acts were touring Brazil for the first time.

The originally scheduled Brazilian acts were Gilberto Gil, Barão Vermelho, Lobão, Engenheiros do Hawaii and Capital Inicial. However, Gilberto Gil cancelled the Rio concert because his son, musician Pedro Gil, was hospitalized in critical condition due to a car accident (he would die days later). Margareth Menezes performed in his place, being booked just a few hours before the performance was due to start.

== 1992 ==
The third edition of Hollywood Rock happened at the Pacaembu stadium in São Paulo, whilst the Rio edition was still held at the Sambadrome. The international lineup was composed of Living Colour, EMF, Seal, Jesus Jones, Skid Row and Extreme, all playing in the country for the first time, while Lulu Santos, Titãs, Paralamas do Sucesso, Barão Vermelho and Cidade Negra formed the Brazilian lineup.

At this edition, Brazilian acts had headliner status for the first time, with Titãs and Paralamas do Sucesso closing the second night of the event in both cities. The joint performance featured one-hour slots for each band and an extended encore with both together on stage. Being a band from São Paulo, Titãs performed last on that city; in Rio, local band Paralamas did so. Living Colour and Skid Row were the international headliners.

== 1993 ==
The fourth edition of Hollywood Rock featured Red Hot Chili Peppers, Nirvana and Simply Red as headliners, with Alice in Chains, L7 and Maxi Priest rounding out the international lineup. The Brazilian acts were Defalla, Biquíni Cavadão, Dr. Sin, Engenheiros do Hawaii and Midnight Blues Band. Due to the high demand for tickets, the venue for the São Paulo concerts was changed back to the larger Morumbi stadium, while the Sambadrome remained the festival's house in Rio. For the first time, Hollywood Rock brought back an international act, Simply Red, featured as opening attraction for Duran Duran at the 1988 edition, and now a headliner.

Nirvana's performances have generated controversy among fans and the media, particularly the São Paulo show, which has been described as "the worst performance of the trio's career." Prior to the São Paulo performance, Nirvana's vocalist and guitarist Kurt Cobain had reportedly mixed pills and alcohol to combat his nervousness over playing to such a large crowd, but this affected his guitar playing, and after about 30 minutes the band started playing a "karaoke-inspired" set instead, exchanging instruments and covering songs by the Clash, Queen, Terry Jacks, Iron Maiden, Duran Duran and others. The band was booed by parts of the audience during this show, although Cobain and bassist Krist Novoselic later remembered the experience fondly. In Rio, the band played a more straightforward set. However, this show also featured Cobain spitting into the lenses of the television cameras and briefly exposing himself to one, as well as attempting to destroy parts of the stage, during "Scentless Apprentice." Parts of this sequence, along with "Dive," part of "Aneurysm" and a jam of the Aerosmith song "Sweet Emotion," appear on the 1994 home video, Live! Tonight! Sold Out!! Cobain mocked the festival's sponsorship by a cigarette company periodically during the performance, and he and drummer Dave Grohl played the encore dressed in lingerie.

Alice in Chains' performance in Rio on January 22 was the last concert with original bassist Mike Starr.

== 1994 ==
The fifth edition of Hollywood Rock once again took place at the Morumbi stadium in São Paulo and the Sambadrome in Rio. The headliners for this edition were Aerosmith, Robert Plant and Whitney Houston. Poison, Ugly Kid Joe and Live completed the international lineup, all performing Brazil for the first time. The Brazilian lineup was formed by Titãs, Sepultura, Skank, Fernanda Abreu and Jorge Ben. Virtually unknown in Brazil at the time, Live was the first international act to perform a daylight time opening concert at Hollywood Rock, before local band Sepultura.

== 1995 ==
The sixth edition of Hollywood Rock was unique in the sense that Souza Cruz merely used the festival's brand to promote the first Brazilian tour of the Rolling Stones. The concerts were a leg of the Voodoo Lounge Tour and three dates were booked for São Paulo, at the Pacaembu Stadium (January 27, 28 and 30), and two for Rio, at the Maracanã Stadium (February 2 and 4). It was the only edition of Hollywood Rock in Rio not to happen at the Sambadrome.

All five dates featured the same lineup, completed by Barão Vermelho, Rita Lee and Spin Doctors.

== 1996 ==
The seventh and last Hollywood Rock festival was headlined by The Cure, Page and Plant and Gilberto Gil, in the second occurrence of a Brazilian act occupying top spot, and performing a special concert with guests like Carlinhos Brown, Lobão and Fernanda Abreu. For the first time, both international headliners had toured Brazil before. Robert Plant had performed at Hollywood Rock without Jimmy Page in 1994, while The Cure had toured Rio, São Paulo, Belo Horizonte and Porto Alegre in 1987. Supergrass, White Zombie, Smashing Pumpkins, Urge Overkill, The Black Crowes, Steel Pulse and Aswad completed the international lineup. Pato Fu, Raimundos, Chico Science e Nação Zumbi and Cidade Negra completed the Brazilian lineup, the latter performing after Steel Pulse on the last night, headlined by Gilberto Gil.

== See also ==
- List of music festivals in Brazil
- List of historic rock festivals
