= Dr. Sin =

Brazilian rock band

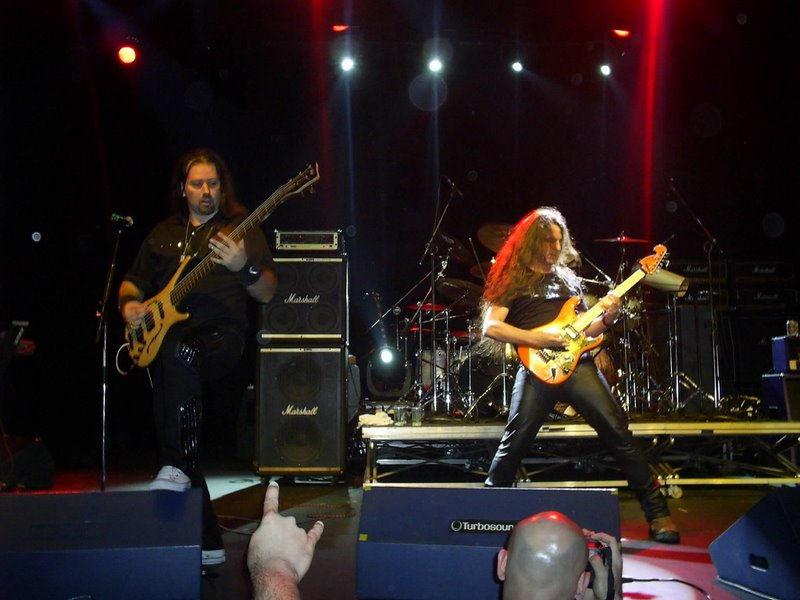

Background information
- Origin: São Paulo, Brazil
- Genres: Heavy metal, hard rock, progressive metal
- Years active: 1991–2016, 2018-present
- Labels: WEA; Century Media; Pony Canyon(Japan)
- Members: Andria Busic; Ivan Busic; Thiago Melo
- Past members: Michael Vescera; Edu Ardanuy
- Website: www.drsinofficial.com.br

Dr. Sin are a Brazilian hard rock band formed in São Paulo in 1991 by Eduardo Ardanuy and brothers Andria and Ivan Busic.

== History ==
=== Formation (1984–1991) ===
The brothers Andria and Ivan Busic formed their first bands, Platina (1984) and Cherokee (1988), respectively. At that time, guitarist Edu Ardanuy was playing with Busics eventually in São Paulo bars.

In 1989, the Busic brothers performed as the backing band for the solo album of Wander Taffo, the former guitarist of the band Rádio Táxi. Two years later, they formed the band Taffo and recorded the album, Rosa Branca. Andria also toured with the band Ultraje a Rigor as a touring member.

Eduardo Ardanuy, who had previously played in bands such as Anjos da Noite and Chave do Sol, was invited to form a new band with the Busic brothers. They become the backing band of vocalist Supla from the band Tokyo. After a few shows, the trio decided it was time to invest in their career, and formed Dr Sin. The band's first concert was on January 11, 1992 at the Black Jack in Sao Paulo. In February and March they performed shows in New York in the USA, and in May they opened for Ian Gillan from Deep Purple in Sao Paulo.

=== Dr Sin, Brutal, and Insinity (1992–1998) ===
In 1992, the band signed a contract with Warner Music, despite not yet having any material recorded. They performed at the 1993 Hollywood Rock festival, sharing the stage with bands such as Nirvana and L7. They also toured as an opening act for Pantera. In July, Warner released their debut album Dr. Sin in nine countries. “Emotional Catastrophe” was a big hit on the music parades, presenting clips on MTV, and eventually became part of the soundtrack for TV Cultura's Brazilian TV series Confessions of Adolescents. “You Stole My Heart” and “Scream & Shout”, were the next videoclips released.

In 1994, they performed at numerous festivals, such as the M2000 Summer Concerts in Porto Alegre, Florianópolis and Santos, where they shared a stage with bands like Mr. Big, The Lemonheads and Rollins Band. They also performed at the Monsters of Rock 1994 along with Slayer, Black Sabbath and Kiss. In July, the band headlined at the Olympia Theatre in Sao Paulo.

Dr Sin's second album, Brutal, was released in 1995. It was released in Japan under the title Silent Scream. Unlike their debut album, Brutal was self-produced, and displayed a heavier and more cohesive sound than their previous work. The album includes keyboardist Marcelo Souss, who had played with the Busic brothers in Taffo, and who also performed during the album's tour. A music video for the song “Down in The Trenches” was released.

In 1996, their success got them into a new opening marathon, opening act for Bon Jovi, Joe Satriani, Steve Vai and AC/DC. Andria and Ivan Busic participated in a fundraising campaign for the CACCC, which helps children with cancer. The video was recorded similar to Michael Jackson's 1980s campaign called USA for Africa. Other artists, such as Fábio Jr., Elba Ramalho, Sérgio Reis, Jair Rodrigues, Jair Oliveira, Luciana Mello and others, participated in the video.

The band recorded their third album, Insinity, at Michael Vescera Studios in the United States. Vescera co-produced the album and also performed on the track “No Rules”. Jonathan Mover made a guest appearance playing drums on the song “Insomnia” and Brazilian sports commentator Silvio Luiz appeared on the song “Futebol, Mulher e Rock and Roll”. This song, together with “Emotional Catastrophe” became one of the greatest hits of the band. Once again the keyboards were recorded by Marcelo Souss.

Dr Sin performed at the 1997 Skol Rock festival alongside Bruce Dickinson, Scorpions and Dio. During the Insinity tour, the band were joined by keyboardist Joey Gross Brown, who shortly after joined the band as a full-time member, a position he would hold until 2002. In April, the band played in Curitiba as the opening act for Quiet Riot. In 1998, the band performed as an opening act for Swedish guitarist Yngwie Malmsteen, and that same year, they released the live album Live in Brazil. Malmsteen enjoyed the opening of the show so much that he included four tracks on the Japanese version of his live album Live!!.

=== Later albums (2000–2007) ===
In 2000, Vescera became a full member of the band and started to share vocals with Andria. As a quartet, they record the fourth self-titled album, Dr. Sin II. In a previously unheard of attitude in Brazil, the band released the album alongside a magazine with the history of the band which could only be purchased at newsstands. The album was received warmly by fans and critics, especially Vescera's contributions. Dr Sin II featured guest appearances from guitarist Sérgio Buss, Jason Himmelberger and Joey Gross Brown on keyboards and Roland Grapow. The song “Time After Time” was the soundtrack of Fórmula Truck racing in Brazil.

In mid-2001, vocalist Vescera decided to leave the band, citing the long travel between the USA where he lived and Brazil. In 2002 keyboardist Joey Gross Brown also left and was replaced with Rodrigo Simão. Once again performing as a trio, Dr Sin released 10 Years Live in late 2003. Recorded in May 2002 at the SESC Ipiranga in São Paulo, it features guest appearances by André Matos in the song “Fire”, Marco Sergio on charango, Marco Cesar on percussion and keyboardists Joey Gross Brown and Marcelo Souss.

In 2005, the cover album Listen to the Doctors was released, featuring cover recordings of classic rock songs. All the tracks have the word "Dr." in their title, such as covers of Kiss “Calling Dr. Love” and “Dr. Feelgood” by Mötley Crüe.

Dr. Sin released Bravo in 2007. The album was first place on CD sales and remains one of the best sellers. The track “Think it Over” was used in the soundtrack for the soap opera Amor e Intrigas, and also features a guest guitar solo by Hudson Cadorini of the duo Edson & Hudson.

In 2009, on April 7, Dr. Sin were the opening act for Kiss at Anhembi Arena to an audience of over 40,000 people. Recently the band performed alongside the São Paulo State Symphonic Band at Sala São Paulo.

In 2011, the band announced the release of their new album, Animal. On July 21, a new song called "May the Force Be with You" was made available for download on their website, named after the classic film Star Wars. In the same month, the band contributed to the soundtrack of the Brazilian film Assault to the Central Bank, directed by Marcos Paulo.

In 2013, Dr. Sin entered the studio to record their next album, Intactus. They followed this by performing at Rock in Rio and Monsters of Rock, followed by a three-week USA tour. In March 2014, they participated as the main band of the Motorcycle Rock Cruise ship.

=== Breakup and Reformation (2015–present) ===
In August 2015, the band announced on their Facebook page that they would end their activities, thanking all the fans for their support during their 23 years of work. They played a farewell tour which started on October 2, 2015 and ended on March 20, 2016.

Andria and Ivan formed a new band called Busic, featuring Portuguese lyrics and a sound more rooted in 70s rock.

In October 2018, brothers Andria and Ivan Busic announced the comeback of Dr. Sin, now featuring guitarist Thiago Melo, who had previously played with the Busic brothers in their side project band, Busic. Their first new album with Melo, Back Home Again, was released on digital platforms on October 19, 2018, and featured the single "Lost in Space".

== Band members ==
=== Current members ===
- Andria Busic – lead vocals, bass (1992–present)
- Ivan Busic – drums, backing vocals (1992–present)
- Thiago Melo – guitar (2018–present)

=== Former members ===
- Michael Vescera – lead vocals, keyboards (2000-2001)
- Marcelo Souss – keyboards (1995–1997)
- Joey Gross Brown – keyboards (1997–2002)
- Rodrigo Simão – keyboards (2002–2012)
- Edu Ardanuy – guitar (1992–2016)

== Discography ==
=== Studio albums ===
- (1993) Dr. Sin
- (1995) Brutal
- (1997) Insinity
- (2000) Dr. Sin II
- (2005) Listen to the Doctors
- (2007) Bravo
- (2009) Original Sin
- (2012) Animal
- (2015) Intactus
- (2019) Back Home Again

=== Live/video albums ===
- (1999) Alive
- (2003) Dr. Sin 10 Anos ao Vivo
- (2023) Dr. Sin Acústico

=== Music videos ===
- (1993) "Emotional Catastrophe"
- (1993) "You Stole my Heart"
- (1993) "Scream and Shout"
- (1995) "Down in the Trenches (pt. I & II)
- (1995) "Silent Scream"
- (1997) "Futebol, Mulher & Rock 'n Roll
- (2003) "Eternity"
- (2011) "May the force be with you"
- (2011) "Those Days"
- (2013) "Lady Lust
- (2013) "Animal"
- (2015) "Soul Survivor"
- (2018) "Lost in Space"

=== Soundtracks ===
- (1994) - Confissões de Adolescente - "Emotional Catastrophe" (Dr. Sin, 1993)
- (2007) - Amor e Intrigas - "Think it Over" (Bravo, 2007)
- (2008) - Chamas da Vida - "Fire" (Brutal, 1995) and "Full Throttle" (Bravo, 2007)
- (2011) - Assalto ao Banco Central - "Think it Over" (Bravo, 2007)
- (2014) - Vitória - "Cry For Love"
