= Eduardo Araújo =

Brazilian rock singer (born 1942)

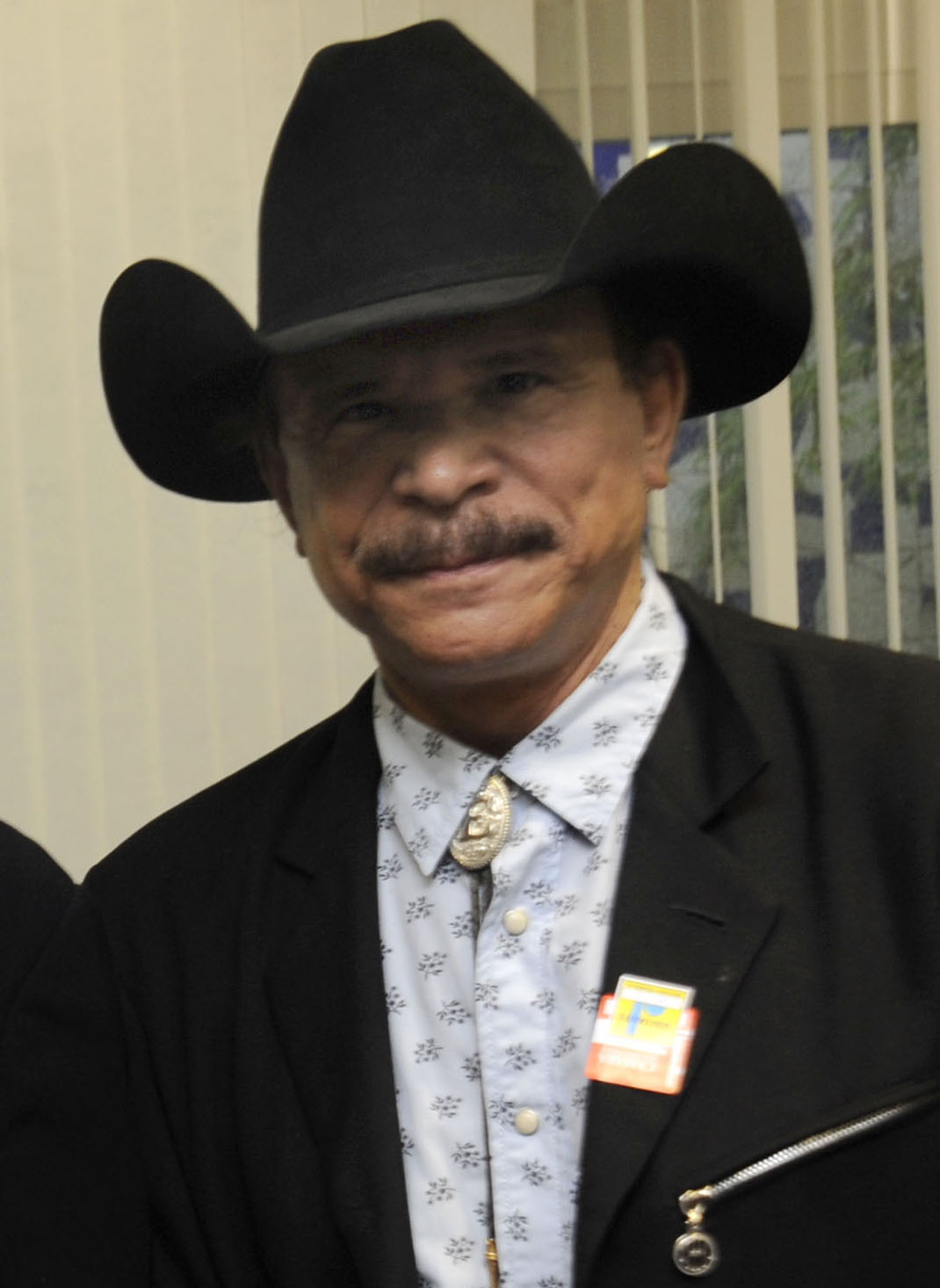

Background information
- Born: Eduardo Oliveira Araújo; July 23, 1942 (age 84); Joaíma, Minas Gerais, Brazil
- Genres: Rock and roll, rockabilly, psychedelic rock, progressive rock country, country rock, soul, MPB
- Website: www.eduardoaraujo.com.br

Eduardo Araújo (born Eduardo Oliveira Araújo; July 23, 1942 in Joaíma) is a Brazilian rock singer. Once part of the Jovem Guarda movement, he is now linked to the country music scene. He is famous for his Jovem Guarda hit "O Bom".

== Discography ==
=== Albums ===
Year	Title	Label
1969	A Onda E Boogaloo	EMI
1995	O Bom (Os Originais)	EMI
2000	Bis: Jovem Guarda	EMI
2000	Eduardo Araújo	BIS Records
