= Supla =

Brazilian musician (born 1965)

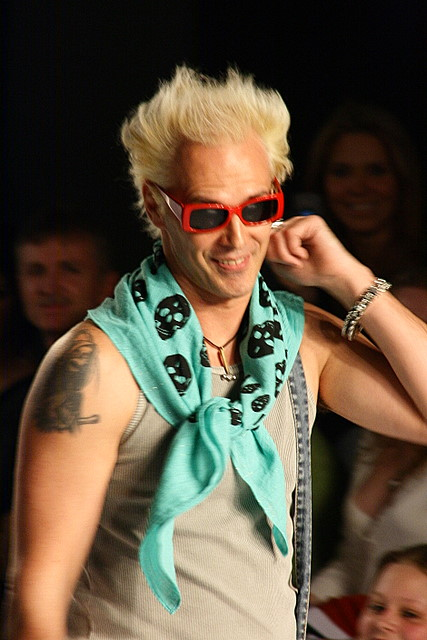

Background information
- Born: Eduardo Smith de Vasconcellos Suplicy; 2 April 1965 (age 61); São Paulo, Brazil
- Genres: Rock, punk rock, post-punk, new wave, bossa nova, rockabilly
- Occupations: Singer, musician, composer
- Years active: 1984–present
- Website: www.Supla.com.br

Eduardo Smith de Vasconcellos Suplicy (born 2 April 1965), known as Supla, is a Brazilian musician.

== Biography ==
Supla was born 2 April 1966 in the city of São Paulo. He is the son of politician Marta Suplicy, a Brazilian of English, Italian and Portuguese descent, former mayor of São Paulo (2001/2005), Senator for São Paulo (2011/2019), and Minister of Tourism (2012/2014), and politician Eduardo Suplicy, a Brazilian of French and Italian descent, former Senator (1991/2014), and leader of the PT (Workers' Party) in the Federal Senate for three times.

Supla and his younger brother João Suplicy perform in the band Brothers of Brazil.

Supla and João have performed in Edinburgh, Scotland Edinburgh Festival, Prague, Czech Republic, New York, Zurich, Switzerland (Caliente Festival), London, (MTV Europe) and Los Angeles, California.

Supla was also part of the winning team on the 2005 Rockgol soccer championship.

=== Early history ===
Supla started his music career at 13 years old, playing drums for "Os Impossiveis" (The Impossibles). Later, he joined the band "Metropolis," also as a drummer.

At 17, Supla formed a band called "Zigue-Zague", in which he was the lead singer. The band changed the name to "Tokyo," and started writing material with a heavy punk influence. Tokyo lasted for three years, did two international tours, and released two studio albums for CBS Records. When the band imploded, Supla went solo.

Supla went on to release seven solo albums that have been well received, both commercially and critically. During a stay in New York City in 1995, he formed the band "Psycho 69", which released one album.

In 2005, he released "Supla Só Na Loucura" as a DVD that includes a long form biographical documentary, a live show from the tour for the album "Menina Mulher", and other extras.

Supla has been singing cover songs together with the punk Brazilian band Holly Tree. He has performed in Zurich, Switzerland (Caliente Festival), London, (MTV Europe) and Los Angeles, California (private shows/recording) where he was promoting his latest CD release, Vicious (December, 2006).

In 2024, Supla performed cosplayed as Livro in the reality singing competition The Masked Singer Brasil.

=== Non-musical career ===
Supla and João have been hosting and performing on Brothers, a one-and-a-half-hour, mainly live, varieties show.

As an actor, Supla has participated in numerous films, TV shows, and soap operas. He has also recorded and performed live with some of Brazil's important musicians: Rita Lee (from Os Mutantes), Bebel Gilberto, CSS, Max Cavalera (from Sepultura), Roger (from Ultraje a Rigor), Ira!, Cauby Peixoto, etc. He also known for his performances with Ian McCulloch from Echo & the Bunnymen.

In April 2007, he began taping his TV Show, "O Rei da Mídia" (The King of Media) for the national channel SBT Supla spends part of his time interviewing musicians, politicians, soccer players and celebrities.

On 15 May 2007, Supla (as sole curator) opened the exposition "ROCKERS" at FAAP (National Gallery). Photographer Bob Gruen showed 290 pictures from his portfolio of Rock Gods exposed in their private and public moments of history.

He was one of the hosts of Monster Jam in São Paulo in 2017 at Arena Corinthians.

== Discography ==
=== Brothers of Brazil ===
- Melodies From Hell (2014)
- On My Way (2012)
- PunkaNova (2010)

=== Solo albums ===
- Supla's Illegal (2017)
- Diga o Que Você Pensa (2016)
- Vicious (2006)
- Supla Só Na Loucura (DVD) (2005)
- Menina Mulher (2004)
- Bossa Furiosa (2003)
- Político e Pirata (2002)
- Charada Brasileiro (2000)
- Psycho 69 (1995)
- Encoleirado (1991)
- Motocicleta Endiabrada

=== With Tokyo ===
- Humanos (1986)
- O outro lado (1988)

== Filmography ==
=== TV shows ===
- Familia (MTV)
- Vídeos Lá Em Casa Com Supla (MTV)
- Casa Dos Artistas (SBT)
- Informer – H do Huck (BAND)
- Viva A Noite – The King Of Midia (SBT)
- Brothers (RedeTV!)
- Brothers na Gringa (RedeTV!)
- Ídolos (American Idol) (Record)
- Papito in love (MTV)

=== Films ===
- O Poeta Da Vila
- Sua Excelência O Candidato
- Rock Estrela
- Nas Duas Almas (short)
- A Agenda (short)
- Uma Escola Atrapalhada
- O Segredo Dos Golfinhos
- Viva Voz

=== Telenovelas ===
- Sex Appeal (Globo)
- Um Anjo Caiu do Céu (Globo)
- Celebridade (Globo)

=== Children's programming ===
- Sítio do Picapau Amarelo (Globo)
