= Ultraje a Rigor =

Brazilian rock band

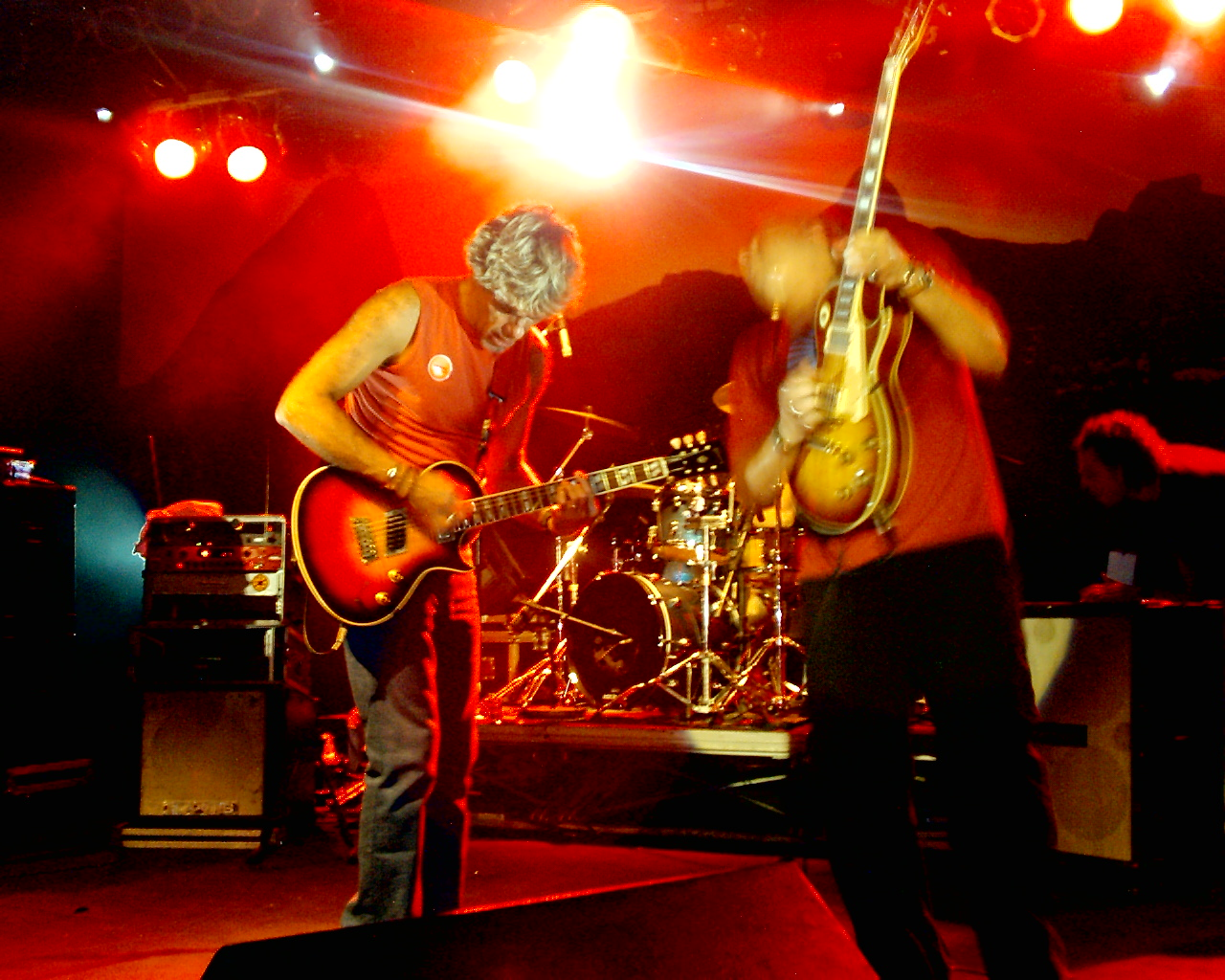
- Ultraje a Rigor playing at Rio de Janeiro

Background information
- Origin: São Paulo, São Paulo, Brazil
- Genres: Rock and roll, punk rock, comedy rock, hard rock
- Years active: 1980–present
- Labels: WEA, Deckdisc
- Members: Roger Moreira; Marcos Kleine; Bacalhau; Andria Busic
- Past members: Mingau; Ivan Busic; Leôspa; Maurício Defendi; Edgard Scandurra; Carlinhos; Flávio Soares Suete; Heraldo Paarmann; Serginho; Sérgio Serra
- Website: www.ultraje.com

Ultraje a Rigor is a Brazilian rock band, which formed in 1980 and experienced great success along with other Brazilian rock bands from that time, mostly during the 1980s.

== History ==
=== Early years ===
Ultraje a Rigor began its performances as a cover band - mostly playing songs of The Beatles, punk rock and new wave songs. The final and official line-up of Roger, Leôspa, Sílvio and Edgard began doing shows at parties and small bars. In 1982, still without an official name, they decided on Ultraje a Rigor.The name referred to the band's irreverence toward the songs they covered, frequently satirizing or distorting them. So, the band's name is a pun with the words "traje a rigor" (a ceremonial suit) and "ultraje" (outrage).

Soon, Silvio left the band and was replaced by Maurício. In April 1983, the new formation took part in the Teatro Lira Paulistana's Boca no Trombone project, the band's first show featuring their own compositions exclusively. After one of these shows they were signed to a recording contract by producer Pena Schmidt who, at the time, was hiring groups such as Titãs for WEA. They recorded their first single, Inútil/Mim quer tocar, which, because of censorship problems, was not released until October of that year. After the single's release, which led to many more gigs for the band, Edgard, already a member of the band Ira!, found himself unable to continue splitting his time between the two bands and left Ultraje. Carlinhos was recruited to replace him. In 1984, with the new line-up, they recorded their second single, Eu me amo/Rebelde sem causa. Eu me amo did well on the radio.

=== Rising up ===
Their first LP, Nós Vamos Invadir sua Praia, released a few months later and given a push by the single Ciúme was a great success. It was the first rock LP in Brazil to go gold and platinum. Most of its songs had widespread airplay. Ultraje broke attendance records at different venues all around Brazil. At the beginning of 1986, they recorded an EP called Liberdade para Marylou, with a remixed version of Nós vamos invadir sua praia, Hino dos cafajestes and a carnival version of Marylou, the censored lines being substituted by trombone riffs. In 1987 they went on to record their second LP, Sexo!!. During the recording sessions Carlinhos, who had been considering a move to Los Angeles to form his own band, left the group and Sérgio Serra was drafted to fill his position. The album's success led to more tours all over Brazil, the writing of more songs, and no vacations, since 1984.

In 1989, more mature and somewhat stressed out by the constant touring, they recorded their third LP, Crescendo. The album sold well, but the media was beginning to lose interest in Ultraje after its four years of success. Even so, Ultraje still provoked controversy, teasing the announcement of the end of official censorship with the song Filha da Puta. The song was censored extra-officially on many radio stations and TV programs, which hindered promotion of the album. Other songs with spicy subjects such as O Chiclete and Volta comigo, a song that deals with adultery, had their airplay compromised. In 1990 Ultraje went back to their roots and released Por Quê Ultraje a rigor?, an album of covers that were part of their repertoire when they were playing small gigs. Mauricio, having married an American girl, moved to Miami, and Andria Busic temporarily joined the band on bass. One month later Andria was replaced by Osvaldo.

After nearly yet another year of touring, Roger realized that Ultraje was no longer the same band. Leôspa, having married, could no longer maintain his enthusiasm for traveling and rehearsing; Sérgio wanted to leave to form his own band; and Osvaldo preferred working in his professional studio. After a conversation with Leôspa, Roger decided to look for new members willing to join Ultraje a Rigor.

=== New lineup ===
Searching through bars and at the shows of bands just getting their start, he found Flávio Suete, a drummer with the band "Nem" (Nor) and The Central Scrutinizer Band, a band that played covers of Frank Zappa. Flávio recommended Serginho Petroni, the bass player in the same band. Together they began to audition new guitarists. After months of auditions and rehearsals they discovered Heraldo Paarmann through an informal announcement on Radio Brasil 2000 FM. They continued rehearsing and played a few shows to tighten up their sound. In 1992, against the band's wishes, WEA released a greatest hits collection called O mundo encantado do Ultraje a Rigor. Although primarily a collection of previously released material, the album contained two new tracks performed by the new line-up, along with some alternate takes of previously released hits.

In 1992, still in rebellion against the indifference of their record company, the group recorded independently Ah, se eu fôsse homem..., an amusing digression on the difficulties faced by men with regard to the new post-feminism. The tape of this song, distributed to radio stations by the band itself, produced the expected results.

In 1993, while in an already tense situation with the record company, they released Ó!, their sixth LP. It was their fourth LP with all-new material, and was hurriedly recorded with a small budget imposed on them by the record company. It was practically ignored by Warner's promotion department. One cut Acontece toda vez que eu fico (Apaixonado) was made into a successful video for MTV but the song was only a modest success in the media and in stores.

In the beginning of 1999, after Serginho left the band and was replaced by Mingau, Ultraje a Rigor has released 18 anos sem tirar!, a live album with a couple of new songs which provides an overview of the band's career up to this point and has already sold over 100,000 copies, a gold record in Brazil.

=== Ultraje in the new millennium ===
In 2002, another change on the lineup: Flávio and Heraldo, keeping away from the musical intentions of the rest of the band, left the band, being replaced by Sérgio Serra and Bacalhau. Soon, they released their sixth album, Os Invisíveis, with the track Domingo eu vou pra praia being a success. In March 2009, Sérgio Serra left the band due to inner discussions. Ultraje a Rigor is now working on a new album entitled Música Esquisita a Troco de Nada.

== Discography ==
=== Studio albums ===
Title	Details
Nós Vamos Invadir sua Praia	Released: 13 July 1985; Label: WEA; Format: CD, LP
Sexo!!	Released: 19 March 1987; Label: WEA; Format: CD, LP
Crescendo	Released: March 1989; Label: WEA; Format: CD, K7, LP
Por que Ultraje a Rigor?	Released: 1990; Label: WEA; Format: CD, LP
Ó!	Released: 1993; Label: WEA; Format: CD, LP
Os Invisíveis	Released: 14 August 2002; Label: Deckdisc; Format: CD
O Embate do Século: Ultraje a Rigor vs. Raimundos (with Raimundos)	Released: 10 July 2012; Label: Deckdisc; Format: CD

=== Live albums ===
Title	Details
18 Anos sem Tirar!	Released: 1999; Label: Deckdisc, Abril Music; Format: CD
Acústico MTV - Ultraje a Rigor	Released: 2005; Label: Deckdisc; Format: CD, DVD
Ira! e Ultraje a Rigor - Ao Vivo Rock in Rio	Released: July 2011; Label: MZA Music; Format: CD, DVD

=== EP ===
Title	Details
Inútil / Mim Quer Tocar	Released: 1983; Label: WEA; Format: EP
Eu Me Amo/Rebelde sem Causa	Released: 1984; Label: WEA; Format: EP
Liberdade para Marylou	Released: 1986; Label: WEA; Format: EP
Música Esquisita a Troco de Nada	Released: 5 April 2009; Label: Independent; Format: download digital
CarnaBullying	Released: 2012; Label: Independent; Format: download digital

=== Compilation albums ===
- O Mundo Encantado do Ultraje a Rigor (1992)

=== Singles ===
- "Inútil" / "Mim quer tocar" (1983)
- "Eu me amo" / "Rebelde sem causa" (1984)
