= Edu Ardanuy =

Brazilian guitarist (born 1967)

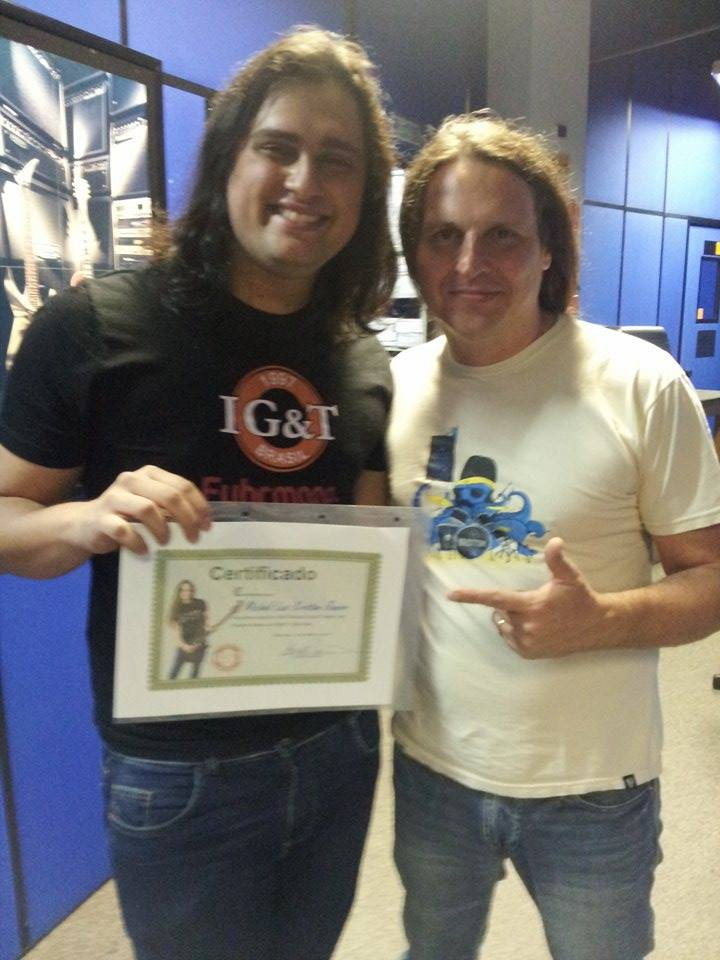
- Miguel Kriston and Edu Ardanuy

Background information
- Born: June 20, 1967 (age 58); São Paulo, São Paulo, Brazil
- Genres: Hard rock, heavy metal, progressive rock
- Instrument: Guitar
- Years active: 1988 – Present
- Formerly of: Dr. Sin
- Website: www.eduardanuy.com.br

Eduardo "Edu" Ardanuy (born June 20, 1967 in São Paulo, Brazil) is a Brazilian guitarist who has worked with such bands as Dr. Sin, Anjos da Noite, Blezqi Zatzas, Supla and Eduardo Araújo. He was included in a 'Top 10 Greatest Guitar Players' ranking by the Guitar Player Magazine in 1998. He has also played with Steve Vai, being invited by him.

== Biography ==
Ardanuy began studying music and playing acoustic guitar at age 13. At age 16, he began to study guitar, when his father gave him an electric guitar, thus, his interest for rock n' roll increased still more, inspired by the rock n' roll bands, such as Deep Purple, Black Sabbath and Led Zeppelin. Edu studied ten hours per day, inspired by artists like Eddie Van Halen, Yngwie Malmsteen, Ritchie Blackmore, Jimmy Page, Jimi Hendrix, Jeff Beck, Alex Lifeson, and others.

In 1989 Edu joined The Key (Ex-A Chave Do Sol), with whom he released the record A New Revolution. Soon after, Edu decided to leave The Key, and joined Anjos da Noite, where they released the record Anjos da Noite by Sony BMG. Soon after, Edu left Anjos da Noite.

In 1993 Edu met the Busic Brothers (Andria and Ivan Busic), with whom he played in jams at nightclubs in São Paulo. They played in solo album by Edu Ardanuy, shows, decided to left Supla and formed Dr. Sin (their present band). With Dr. Sin, Edu played at many rock festivals, such as Hollywood Rock, Monsters of Rock, M2000 Summer Concerts, Skol Rock and Live n' Louder.

In 2007, Dr. Sin released the CD Bravo (Century Media/Dynamo Records), that was a success in Brazil. He will also release his first solo album in 2008.

== Discography ==
The Key

- The Key - A New Revolution

Anjos da Noite

- Anjos da Noite - Anjos da Noite

Dr.Sin

- Encoleirado - Supla
- Dr. Sin - Dr. Sin
- Brutal / Silent Scream - Dr. Sin
- Insinity - Dr. Sin
- Alive / Live in Brazil - Dr. Sin
- Dr. Sin II / Shadows of Light - Dr. Sin
- 10 Years Live - Dr. Sin
- Listen to the Doctors - Dr. Sin
- Bravo - Dr. Sin

Solo

- Electric Nightmare(2008)

Other

- Zoom Challenge( Edu and Kiko Loureiro)
- Explano! - Explano! as Guest (Eduardo Lira)
