= Amon Göth =

Austrian military officer and war criminal (1908–1946)

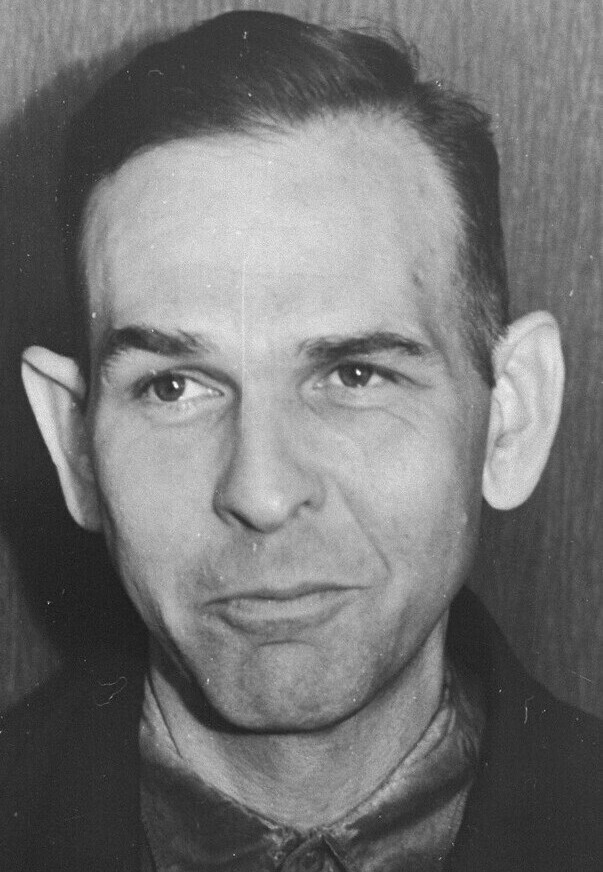
- Göth in 1946, shortly before his execution
- Born: Amon Leopold Göth; 11 December 1908; Vienna, Austria-Hungary
- Died: 13 September 1946 (aged 37); Montelupich Prison, Kraków, Poland
- Cause of death: Execution by hanging
- Known for: Commandant of Płaszów labour camp
- Spouses: Olga Janauschek (m. 1934, divorced) Anny Geiger (m. 1938; div. 1944)
- Partner: Ruth Irene Kalder
- Children: 4
- Status: Executed
- Conviction: Crimes against humanity
- Trial: Supreme National Tribunal
- Penalty: Death
- SS career
- Allegiance: Nazi Germany
- Branch: Schutzstaffel
- Service years: 1930–1945
- Rank: Hauptsturmführer
- Nickname: The Butcher of Płaszów
- Unit: SS-Totenkopfverbände
- Commands: Płaszów labour camp

Amon Leopold Göth (Note: Alternative spelling Goeth) (German: [ˈɡøːt]; 11 December 1908 – 13 September 1946) was an Austrian SS functionary and war criminal. He served as the commandant of the Kraków-Płaszów concentration camp in Płaszów in German-occupied Poland for most of the camp's existence during World War II.

Göth was tried after the war by the Supreme National Tribunal of Poland at Kraków and was found guilty of personally ordering the imprisonment, torture, and extermination of individuals and groups of people. He was also convicted of homicide, the first such conviction at a war crimes trial, for "personally killing, maiming and torturing a substantial, albeit unidentified number of people."

Göth was executed by hanging not far from the former site of the Płaszów camp. The 1993 film Schindler's List, in which Göth is portrayed by Ralph Fiennes, depicts his running of the Płaszów concentration camp.

== Early life and career ==
Göth was born on 11 December 1908 in Vienna, then the capital of the Austro-Hungarian Empire, to a family in the book publishing industry. Göth joined a Nazi youth group at age 17 and was a member of the antisemitic nationalist paramilitary group Heimwehr (Home Guard) from 1927 to 1930. He dropped his membership to join the Austrian branch of the Nazi Party, being assigned the party membership number 510,764 in September 1930. Göth joined the Austrian SS in 1930 and was appointed an SS-Mann with the SS number 43,673.

Upon joining the Nazis, Göth began working in the Margareten district Ortsgruppe (local group) in Vienna. He soon moved to the Mariahilf Ortsgruppe to work in the Sturmabteilung (SA) and as a political leader. He next served with the SS Truppe Deimel and Sturm Libardi in Vienna until January 1933, when he was promoted to serve as adjutant and Zugführer (platoon leader) of the 52nd SS-Standarte, a regimental-sized unit. He was quickly promoted to SS-Scharführer (squad leader). He fled to Germany when his illegal activities, including obtaining explosives for the Nazi Party, made him a wanted man. The Austrian Nazi Party was declared illegal in Austria on 19 June 1933, so it set up operations in exile in Munich. From this base, Göth smuggled radios and weapons into Austria and acted as a courier for the SS. He was arrested in October 1933 by the Austrian authorities but was released for lack of evidence in December 1933. He was again detained after the assassination of Austrian Chancellor Engelbert Dollfuss in a failed Nazi coup attempt in July 1934. He escaped custody and fled to the SS training facility at Dachau, next to Dachau concentration camp. He temporarily quit the SS and Nazi Party activities until 1937 because of differences with his Oberführer (commander) Alfred Bigler, and lived in Munich while trying to help his parents to develop their publishing business. He married on the recommendation of his parents, but was divorced after only a few months.

Göth returned to Vienna shortly after the Anschluss in 1938 and resumed his party activities. He married Anna Geiger, a woman he met at a motorcycle race, in an SS civil ceremony on 23 October 1938. Prior to the wedding, the couple had to pass a set of strict physical tests administered by the SS to determine the suitability of the marriage. The couple had three children: Peter, born in 1939, who died of diphtheria aged seven months; Werner, born in 1940; and a daughter, Ingeborg, born in 1941. The couple maintained a home in Vienna throughout World War II.

Initially assigned to 89th SS-Standarte, Göth was transferred to the 1st SS-Sturmbann of the 11th SS-Standarte at the start of the war, and was promoted to SS-Oberscharführer (staff sergeant) in early 1941. On 5 March 1940, he was drafted into the Wehrmacht with the rank of Unterfeldwebel (Under Field Sergeant), but his continuous SS service record indicates he did not actively serve. From mid-1941 to late May 1942, as Einsatzführer (action leader), and financial officer in East Upper Silesia in the Kattowitz office of the Reichskommissariat für die Festigung deutschen Volkstums – RKFDV (Reich Commissioner for the Consolidation of German Nationhood), he gained a reputation as a seasoned administrator in the Nazi efforts to isolate, relocate, and kill the Jewish population of Europe. He was commissioned to the rank of SS-Untersturmführer (second lieutenant) on 14 July 1941. Göth also received a Dienstleistungszeugnis (Certificate of Service) from his commanding officer, praising his service, as well as his physical and ideological traits.

He was transferred to Lublin in the summer of 1942, where he joined the staff of SS-Brigadeführer Odilo Globočnik, the SS and Police Leader of the Kraków area, as part of Operation Reinhard, the code name given to the establishment of the three extermination camps at Bełżec, Sobibór, and Treblinka. Nothing is known of his activities in the six months he served with Operation Reinhard because participants were sworn to secrecy, but, according to the transcripts of his later trial, Göth was responsible for rounding up and transporting victims to these camps to be murdered.

== Płaszów ==
Göth was assigned to the SS-Totenkopfverbände ("Death's head" unit; concentration camp service). His first assignment, starting on 11 February 1943, was to oversee the construction of the 200 acre Kraków-Płaszów concentration camp, which he was to command. Located on the grounds of two old Jewish cemeteries, the camp took one month to construct using slave labour. On 13 March 1943, the Jewish ghetto of Kraków was liquidated and those still fit for work were sent to the new camp at Płaszów. Several thousand deemed not fit for work were sent to extermination camps and murdered. Hundreds more were murdered on the streets by the Nazis as they cleared out the ghetto. In his opening address as the Kommandant of the newly populated camp, Göth told his new prisoners, "I am your god." Göth had complete authority over the camp, especially in this early stage.

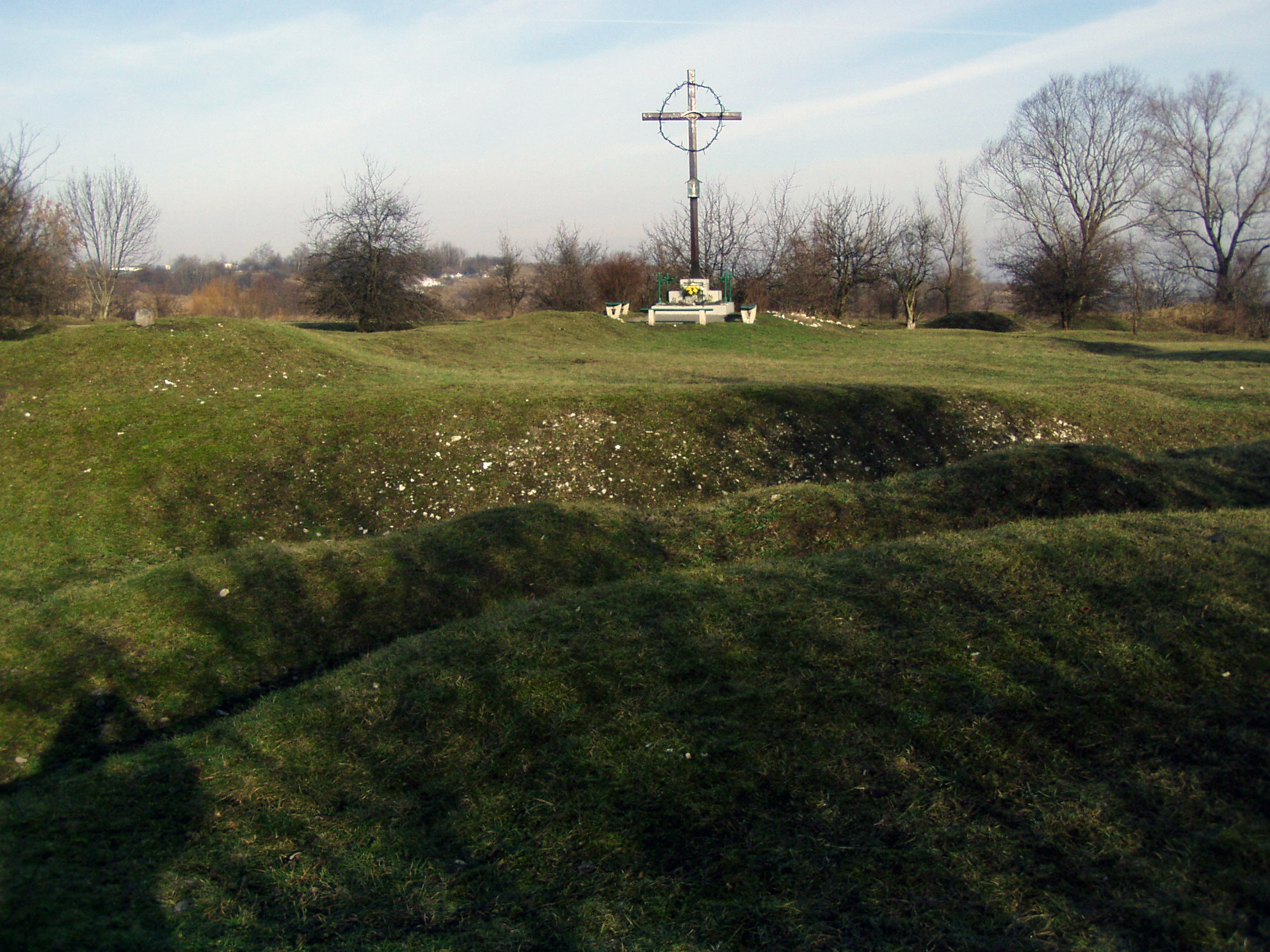
Hujowa Górka ("Prick Hill"), the execution place in Kraków-Płaszów concentration camp (2007)

In addition to his duties at Płaszów, Göth was the officer in charge of the liquidation of the ghetto at Tarnów, which had been home to 25,000 Jews (about 45 percent of the city's population) at the start of World War II. About 10,000 were sent to Płaszów to be slave labourers. By the time the ghetto was liquidated, 8,000 Jews remained. The final roundup began on 1 September 1943, when the remaining Jews were assembled in Magdeburg Square, which was surrounded by heavily armed guards. The trains were loaded and departed by midday the next day. Most of the victims were sent to Auschwitz concentration camp; fewer than half survived the journey. Most of the survivors were deemed unsuitable for slave labour and were murdered immediately on their arrival at Auschwitz. According to testimony of several witnesses as recorded in his 1946 indictment for war crimes, Göth personally shot between 30 and 90 women and children during the liquidation of the ghetto.

On his birthday in 1943, Göth ordered Natalia Karp, who had just arrived in Płaszów, to play the piano. Karp performed Frédéric Chopin's Nocturne in C-sharp minor so well that Göth allowed her and her sister to live.

Göth was also the officer in charge of the liquidation of Szebnie concentration camp, which interned 4,000 Jewish and 1,500 Polish slave labourers. Evidence presented at Göth's trial indicates he delegated this task to a subordinate, SS-Hauptscharführer Josef Grzimek, who was sent to assist camp commandant SS-Hauptsturmführer Hans Kellermann with mass killings. Between 21 September 1943 and 3 February 1944, the camp was gradually liquidated. Almost all of the Polish inmates were transferred to Płaszów or the Bochnia Ghetto, where Göth was also in command. Around a thousand Jews were taken to the nearby forest and shot, and the remainder were sent to Auschwitz, where most were gassed immediately on arrival. After the liquidation, Göth had all the camp's supplies sorted and transported to Płaszów.

On 28 July 1943, Göth was assigned to Section F, the SS and Police Fachgruppe (section of experts) that specialised in ghetto liquidation and transport. By April 1944, Göth had been promoted to the rank of SS-Hauptsturmführer (captain), the highest of the company grade ranks, having received a double promotion, skipping the rank of SS-Obersturmführer (first lieutenant). He was also appointed a reserve officer of the Waffen-SS. In early 1944 the status of the Kraków-Płaszów Labour Camp changed to a permanent concentration camp under the direct authority of the SS-Wirtschafts-Verwaltungshauptamt (WVHA; SS Economics and Administration Office). This distinction made Kraków-Płaszów one of 13 official concentration camps in Poland. Mietek Pemper (Note: Mieczysław "Mietek" Pemper, who was Jewish, was forced to work as Göth's personal secretary and stenographer in Płaszów. Using names provided by Jewish Ghetto Police officer Marcel Goldberg, Pemper compiled and typed the list of 1,200 Jews whose lives were saved when they were sent to Oskar Schindler's camp in Brněnec, Czech Protectorate, in October 1944.) testified at the trial that it was during the earlier period that Göth committed most of the random and brutal killings for which he became notorious. In early May 1944, Göth was informed that 10,000 Hungarian Jews would soon be sent to be imprisoned in Płaszów. To create space for the new arrivals, on 14 May Göth ordered all children in the camp to be moved to the kindergarten. The next day, Göth had the majority of them, with only a few exceptions, sent to Auschwitz to be killed. Concentration camps were more closely monitored by the SS than labour camps, so conditions improved slightly when the designation was changed.

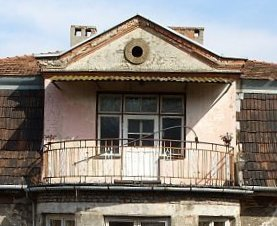
Balcony of Amon Göth's house in Płaszów, from which Helen Jonas-Rosenzweig said Göth would shoot at prisoners. His Tyrolean hat would mark his intentions. It was the signal for seasoned prisoners to attempt to hide.

The camp housed about 2,000 inmates when it opened. At its peak of operations in 1944, a staff of 636 guards oversaw 25,000 permanent inmates, and an additional 150,000 people passed through the camp in its role as a transit camp. Göth, described by survivors as a huge and imposing man, personally murdered prisoners on a daily basis. His two dogs, Rolf, a Great Dane, and Ralf, an Alsatian mix, were trained to tear inmates to death. He shot people from the window of his office if they appeared to be moving too slowly or resting in the yard. He shot a Jewish cook to death because the soup was too hot. He brutally mistreated his two maids, Helen Jonas-Rosenzweig and Helen Hirsch, who were in constant fear for their lives, as were all the inmates. During his time at Płaszów, Göth lived comfortably in a villa, owning cars and horses that he rode in the camp. He had a Jewish cobbler inmate make him new shoes each week.

As a survivor I can tell you that we are all traumatized people. Never would I, never, believe that any human being would be capable of such horror, of such atrocities. When we saw him from a distance, everybody was hiding, in latrines, wherever they could hide. I can't tell you how people feared him.

— Helen Jonas-Rosenzweig

Poldek Pfefferberg, another Schindlerjude (Schindler Jew), said: "When you saw Göth, you saw death."

Göth believed if one member of a work team escaped or committed some infraction, the entire team must be punished. On one occasion, he ordered the shooting of every second member of a work group because one of the party had escaped. On another occasion, he personally shot every fifth member of a crew because one had not returned to the camp. If inmates were caught smuggling food, they were shot. The main murder site at Płaszów was Hujowa Górka ("Prick Hill"), a large hill that was used for mass killings and murders. Pemper testified that 8,000 to 12,000 people were murdered at Płaszów.

== Dismissal and capture ==
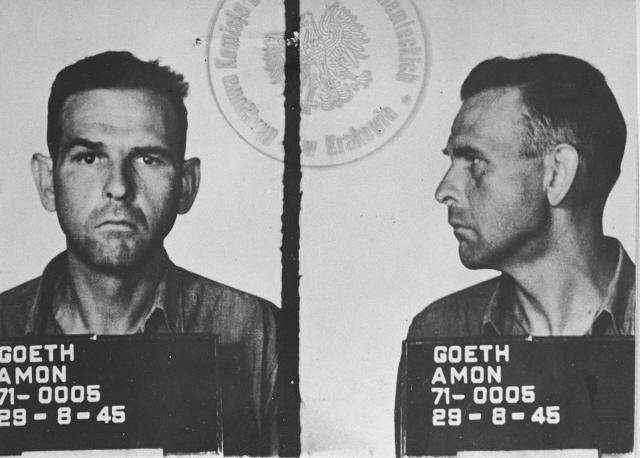
Göth's 1945 mugshot

On 13 September 1944, Göth was relieved of his position and charged by the SS with theft of Jewish property (which belonged to the state, according to Nazi regulations), failure to provide adequate food to the prisoners under his charge, violation of concentration camp regulations regarding the treatment and punishment of prisoners, and allowing unauthorised access to camp personnel records by prisoners and non-commissioned officers. Administration of the camp at Płaszów was turned over to SS-Obersturmführer Arnold Büscher. Göth was scheduled for an appearance before SS Judge Georg Konrad Morgen, but due to the progress of World War II and Germany's looming defeat, the charges against him were dropped in early 1945. SS doctors diagnosed Göth with a mental illness, and he was committed to a mental institution in Bad Tölz in Bavaria.

Göth was arrested by the United States military in May 1945. He was arrested wearing a Wehrmacht uniform, and did not admit to being an SS officer. He was sent to a temporary prison camp located on the grounds of the former Dachau concentration camp. In the 2020s, researchers, including Jonathan Kalmus and Rabbi Naftali Schiff, found documentation that proved a story told by survivor Josef Lewkowicz, who had claimed that the Americans initially lost Göth in their prisoner population. In 1946, Lewkowicz tracked down Göth and then solicited further identifications of him by former inmates of the Kraków-Płaszów concentration camp so that he could be brought to trial.

== Trial and execution ==
After the war, Göth was extradited to Poland, where he was tried by the Supreme National Tribunal of Poland in Kraków between 27 August and 5 September 1946. Göth was found guilty of membership in the Nazi Party (which had been declared a criminal organisation) and personally ordering the imprisonment, torture, and extermination of individuals and groups of people. He was also convicted of homicide, the first such conviction at a war crimes trial, for "personally killing, maiming and torturing a substantial, albeit unidentified number of people."

He was sentenced to death and was hanged on 13 September 1946 at the Montelupich Prison in Kraków, not far from the site of the Płaszów camp. His remains were cremated and the ashes thrown in the Vistula River.

== Family ==
In addition to his two marriages, Göth had a two-year relationship with Ruth Irene Kalder, a beautician and aspiring actress originally from Breslau (or Gleiwitz; sources vary). Kalder first met Göth in 1942 or early 1943 when she worked as a secretary at Oskar Schindler's enamelware factory in Kraków. She met Göth when Schindler brought her to dinner at the villa at Płaszów; she said it was love at first sight. She soon moved in with Göth and the two had an affair, but she stated that she never visited the camp itself. Göth's second wife Anna, still living in Vienna with their two children, filed for divorce upon learning of Göth's affair with Kalder. Kalder left for Bad Tölz to be with her mother for the birth of her daughter, Monika Hertwig, on 7 November 1945. This was Göth's last child. Kalder was devastated by Göth's execution in 1946, and she took Göth's name shortly after his death.

In 2002, Hertwig published her memoirs under the title Ich muß doch meinen Vater lieben, oder? ("I do have to love my father, don't I?"). Hertwig described her mother as unconditionally glorifying Göth until confronted with his role in the Holocaust. Kalder suffered from emphysema and committed suicide in 1983 shortly after giving an interview in Jon Blair's documentary Schindler. Hertwig's experiences in dealing with her father's crimes are detailed in Inheritance, a 2006 documentary directed by James Moll. Appearing in the documentary is Helen Jonas-Rosenzweig, a camp inmate and one of Göth's Jewish former housemaids at Płaszów. The documentary details the meeting of the two women at the Płaszów memorial site in Poland. Hertwig had requested the meeting, but Jonas-Rosenzweig was hesitant because her memories of Göth and the concentration camp were so traumatic. She eventually agreed after Hertwig wrote to her, "We have to do it for the murdered people." Jonas felt touched by this sentiment and agreed to meet her.

In a subsequent interview, Jonas-Rosenzweig recalled:

It's hard for me to be with her because she reminds me a lot of, you know ... she's tall, she has certain features. And I hated him so. But she is a victim. And I think it's important because she is willing to tell the story in Germany. She told me people don't want to know, they want to go on with their lives. And I think it's very important because there's a lot of children of perpetrators, and I think she's a brave person to go on talking about it, because it's difficult. And I feel for Monika. I am a mother, I have children. And she is affected by the fact that her father was a perpetrator. But my children are also affected by it. And that's why we both came here. The world has to know, to prevent something like this from happening again.

Hertwig also appeared in a 2011 documentary called Hitler's Children, directed and produced by Chanoch Ze'evi, an Israeli documentary filmmaker. In the documentary, Hertwig and other close relatives of infamous Nazi leaders describe their feelings, relationships, and memories of their relatives.

Jennifer Teege is the daughter of Monika Hertwig and a Nigerian man with whom Hertwig had a brief relationship. She was raised in foster care. She discovered that Göth was her grandfather through Hertwig's 2002 memoirs. Teege addressed her coming to terms with her origins in the book, My Grandfather Would Have Shot Me (originally published as Amon. Mein Großvater hätte mich erschossen in 2013).

== In media and culture ==
Göth's actions at Płaszów Labour Camp became internationally known through his depiction by Ralph Fiennes in the film Schindler's List (1993). In an interview, Fiennes recalled:

People believe that they've got to do a job, they've got to take on an ideology, that they've got a life to lead; they've got to survive, a job to do, it's every day inch by inch, little compromises, little ways of telling yourself this is how you should lead your life and suddenly then these things can happen. I mean, I could make a judgment myself privately, this is a terrible, evil, horrific man. But the job was to portray the man, the human being. There's a sort of banality, that everydayness, that I think was important. And it was in the screenplay. In fact, one of the first scenes with Oskar Schindler, with Liam Neeson, was a scene where I'm saying, 'You don't understand how hard it is, I have to order so many—so many metres of barbed wire and so many fencing posts and I have to get so many people from A to B.' And, you know, he's sort of letting off steam about the difficulties of the job.

Fiennes won a BAFTA Award for Best Supporting Actor for his role and was nominated for an Academy Award for Best Supporting Actor. His portrayal ranked 15th on American Film Institute's list of the top 50 film villains of all time, the highest ranking for a depiction of a non-fictional person. When Płaszów survivor Mila Pfefferberg was introduced to Fiennes on the set of the film, she began to shake uncontrollably, as Fiennes, costumed in full SS dress uniform, reminded her of the real Amon Göth.

== Notes ==
Military offices
Preceded by None	Commandant of Kraków-Płaszów concentration camp 11 February 1943 – 13 September 1944	Succeeded by SS-Obersturmführer Arnold Büscher
