= Bauscher =

Bauscher is a surname. Notable people with the surname include:

- Matt Bauscher (born 1985), American basketball player

== See also ==
- Buscher
