= Abraham Bankier =

Polish-born businessman and Holocaust survivor (1895–1956)

- Born: May 5, 1895; Kraków, Grand Duchy of Cracow, Austro-Hungarian Empire
- Died: 1956 (aged 61); Vienna, Austria
- Occupation: Businessman
- Known for: Factory manager of Oskar Schindler who assisted him with his rescue activity

Abraham Bankier (May 5, 1895 – 1956) was a Polish-born Jewish businessman and Holocaust survivor who assisted Oskar Schindler in his rescue activities and worked as his factory manager.

== Life ==
Bankier was born in Kraków, then a part of Austria-Hungary, on May 5, 1895, to an observant Jewish family.

Prior to World War II, Bankier was one of the owners of the Rekord Ltd. (Note: The full name of the company was Pierwsza Małopolska Fabryka Naczyń Emaliowanych i Wyrobów Blaszanych "Rekord".) factory on Lipowa street in Kraków, Poland, that Oskar Schindler took over during the Nazi occupation of Poland. Schindler then employed Bankier to manage the factory, which was renamed Deutsche Emailwarenfabrik Oskar Schindler (German Enamelware Factory Oskar Schindler), called "Emalia" for short. Bankier was able to leverage black market dealings with extra scrap metal to bring additional Jews to work at the factory, thereby giving them temporary reprieve from deportations and from the dangers of Kraków Ghetto (and after the closure of the ghetto, the Kraków-Płaszów concentration camp), thus ultimately saving many lives.

Bankier himself was saved by Schindler when, having forgotten his employment pass, he and some other Emalia workers were put on a train destined for a Nazi extermination camp in eastern Poland. Schindler found them shortly before the train departed and was able to have them taken off the train.

When Thomas Keneally's 1982 novel Schindler's Ark was adapted into the movie Schindler's List, Bankier's role was combined, along with those of Itzhak Stern and Mietek Pemper, into the composite character "Itzhak Stern". This was a distortion, most likely caused by the fact that most of Keneally's and Spielberg's historical witnesses knew Schindler from his subsequent time in Brünnlitz, not in Kraków, where most of the film transpired and Bankier did much of his work. According to American Holocaust historian David M. Crowe, "Bankier's skills as a businessman and a black marketeer provided Oskar Schindler with the vast resources he needed to hire, house, feed, transfer, and save hundreds of Jewish workers."

Bankier died in 1956 in Vienna, Austria, at the Vienna South Train Station, of his third heart attack.
