= Buescher =

Buescher or Büscher is a German surname. Notable people with the surname include:

- Arnold Büscher (1899–1949), German Nazi concentration camp commandant
- Bernie Buescher (born 1949), secretary of state of Colorado
- Brian Buescher (born 1975), United States district judge
- Chris Buescher (born 1992), NASCAR driver
- Erin Buescher Perperoglou (born 1979), American basketball player
- James Buescher (born 1990), NASCAR driver
- Julian Büscher (born 1993), German footballer
- Julianne Buescher (born 1965), American actress and puppeteer
- Ulrich Büscher (born 1958), German footballer

== See also ==
- Buescher Band Instrument Company, a former musical instrument manufacturer
- Buescher State Park, a park in Smithville, Texas
- Buscher
