= List of subcamps of Kraków-Płaszów =

List of subcamps of the Kraków-Płaszów complex of Nazi concentration camps located mostly in the vicinity of Kraków in the semi-colonial district of General Government in occupied Poland between 1942–1944.

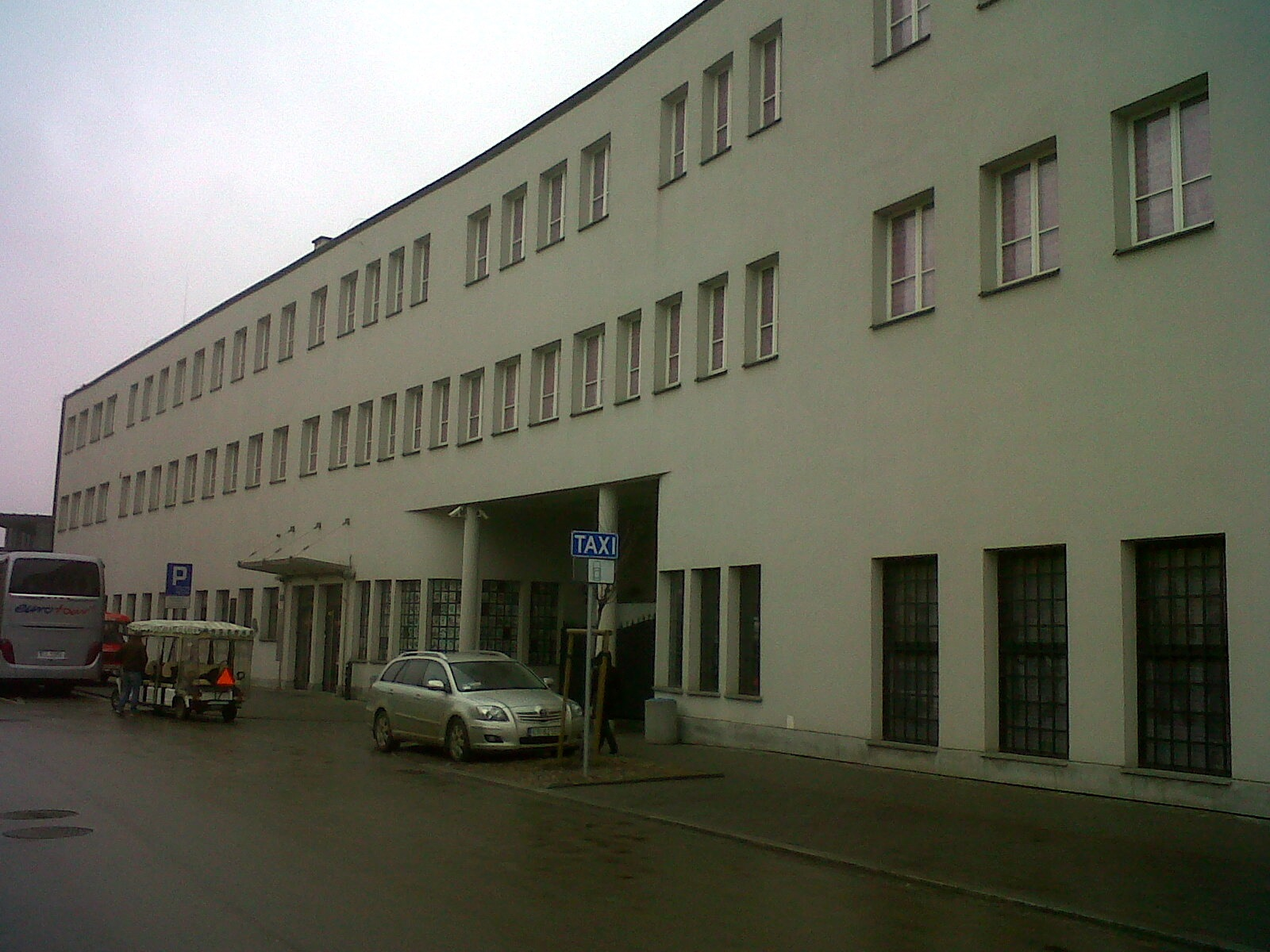
Former "Deutsche Emaillewarenfabrik" run by Oskar Schindler; today a museum

1. Kraków Płaszów (Julag I)
2. Kraków Prokocim (Julag II)
3. Kraków Bieżanow (Julag III)
4. so-called Kabel camp

established in March 1943 at the former "Kabel" plant in Kraków, at 75 Prokocimska street.

1. Kraków Zabłocie DEF, Oskar Schindler's "Deutsche Emaillewarenfabrik", former "Rekord" plant, at 4 Lipowa street in central Kraków, with 1,200 slave workers.
2. Kraków Zabłocie NKF
1. Kraków Zabłocie Feldpunkt
2. Kraków Rakowice near the airport
3. Mielec in former Polish airplane factory, set up for Heinkel (Luftwaffe) in 1939, with 2,000 slave workers including 300 (preyed upon) kitchen and maintenance women.
4. Wieliczka (1944), underground airplane parts factory located at the site of the Wieliczka Salt Mine with 1,700 slave workers.
5. Zakopane (1942–1943), stone quarry "Stuag" with 1,000 slave workers.

== See also ==
- List of Nazi-German concentration camps
