= Mietek Pemper =

Polish-born German Holocaust survivor (1920–2011)

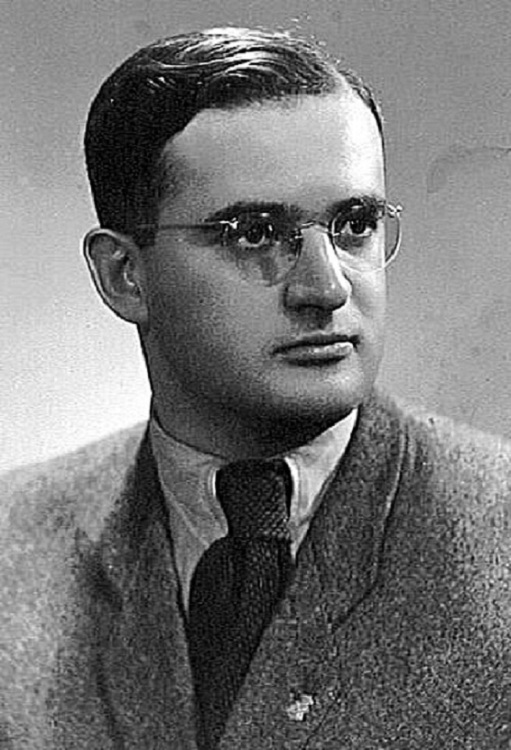
- Pemper in April 1940
- Born: Mieczysław Pemper; 24 March 1920; Kraków, Poland
- Died: 7 June 2011 (aged 91); Augsburg, Bavaria, Germany
- Known for: Assisted Oskar Schindler in his rescue activities.
- Notable work: The Road to Rescue

Mieczysław "Mietek" Pemper (24 March 1920 – 7 June 2011) was a Polish-born German Holocaust survivor. Pemper helped compile and type Oskar Schindler's now-famous list, which saved 1,200 people from being killed in the Holocaust during World War II.

== Early life ==
Pemper was born into a Jewish family in Kraków, Poland on 24 March 1920 to Jakub and Regina Pemper. He had one younger brother, Stefan Pemper. In Polish, "Mietek" is short for "Mieczysław", and his family and friends referred to him as such. From early childhood, Pemper was bilingual in Polish and German. He studied law at Jagiellonian University and business administration at the Kraków University of Economics simultaneously.

== Płaszów and Oskar Schindler ==
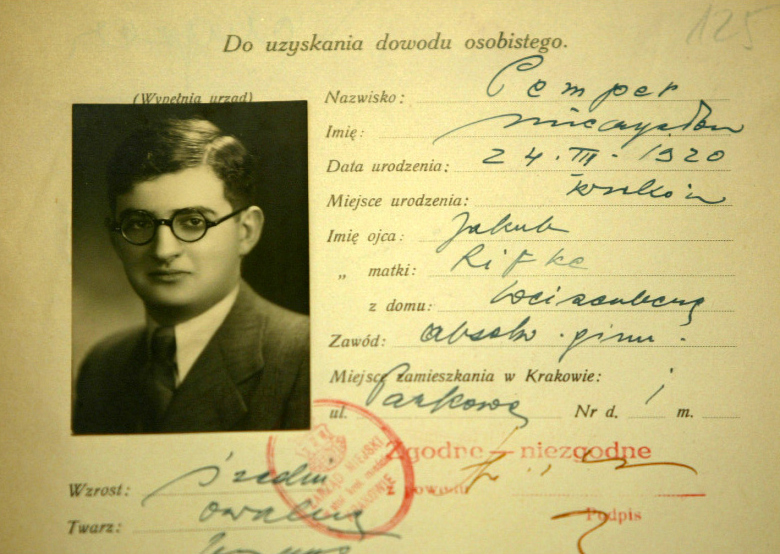
Pemper in 1938.

Pemper was 19 years old when Nazi Germany invaded Poland in 1939. All Jews in Kraków, including Pemper and his family, were required to wear Star of David yellow badges by the Nazis. Pemper stayed at home as much as possible in protest against the badges. While spending most of his time in his family's apartment, Pemper decided to teach himself German stenography, since he had already learned German shorthand. Shortly after, Pemper and his family were confined to the Kraków Ghetto, and he was soon appointed by Nazi officials as a clerk for the Judenrat, the Kraków Ghetto's Jewish administration. Pemper also acted as a German-Polish interpreter for the Kraków Ghetto residents and typed up radio broadcasts from the BBC.

The Kraków Ghetto had started deportations by the end of 1942; between 13 and 15 March 1943 it was fully liquidated. Pemper was deported from the ghetto to Płaszów concentration camp. He was assigned as the personal secretary and stenographer to Amon Göth, Płaszów's notorious commandant, due to his previous work at the Kraków Ghetto's Judenrat. Pemper's position as Göth's assistant gave him rare access to documents sent to Göth from Nazi authorities. By working in Göth's office, Pemper also became an acquaintance of Oskar Schindler, an ethnic German businessman and industrialist with ties to the black market. At first, Schindler wanted to profit from the German invasion of Poland and as the war ensued, Schindler decided to open an enamelware factory in Kraków using mostly Jewish labor. Later, he became sympathetic to his workers and used his position to protect them. Itzhak Stern, an accountant and Pemper's closest friend in Göth's office, persuaded Pemper that Schindler could be trusted.

Pemper typed his first letter to Oskar Schindler in March 1943, without the knowledge that Schindler had sympathies for his Jewish workers. Through his work in the office, Pemper discovered in 1944 that the Nazis intended to close all factories not directly tied to the war effort, including Schindler's enamelware factory and the other facilities connected to Płaszów. These closures would likely mean that Płaszów's Jewish inmates would be deported to a death camp. Pemper personally alerted Schindler to the plans and persuaded him to switch production from enamelware to anti-tank grenades to save Schindler's workers. Pemper provided Schindler with as little information as possible, for fear that Schindler could possibly implicate him in the sharing of classified Nazi secrets that were retained in the Płaszów camp's administrative office.

Pemper helped develop the now famous "Schindler's List" to save as many Jewish workers as possible. In collaboration with Schindler and others in the Płaszów concentration camp including Itzhak Stern, he compiled and typed the list of over 1,000 Jewish inmates deemed "decisive for the Nazi war effort." Many on the list worked for Schindler with additional names added just before the transport. Those on the list, including Pemper himself, were transferred to Schindler's new factory located in Brněnec, Czechoslovakia, in October 1944. This transfer ultimately saved the lives of those who were on the list. Schindler also included Pemper's father, mother, and brother on the list. However, Pemper's mother Regina, because of illness, was left behind in Auschwitz, but she survived until liberation.

At the end of the war, Oskar Schindler gave a speech to his Jewish factory workers, urging: "Don't thank me for your survival... thank your valiant Stern and Pemper, who stared death in the face constantly."

Pemper testified against Göth at his September 1946 trial in Kraków following the end of the war. Göth was sentenced to death and executed in 1946.

== Later life ==
Pemper moved to the city of Augsburg, Bavaria, in 1958 and became a German citizen. He worked as a management consultant and an intercultural activist, specifically focusing on Jewish-Christian relations and reconciliation. He kept close contact with Oskar Schindler until Schindler's death in 1974.

He served as a consultant for Steven Spielberg's 1993 film, Schindler's List. The movie minimized Pemper's role in collaborating with Schindler during the war. Spielberg sought to simplify the film's storyline by creating a composite character, portrayed by actor Ben Kingsley, based on the historical roles of Mietek Pemper, Itzhak Stern and Abraham Bankier. However, Pemper dismissed his diminished role in the film, saying his accomplishment was not the list that was compiled and typed, but "the multifarious acts of resistance that, like tiny stones being placed into a mosaic one by one, had made the whole process possible," according to The Daily Telegraph. Spielberg paid tribute to both Pemper and Stern outside of the film, calling them heroes. Pemper himself was portrayed by actor Grzegorz Kwas in the film.

In 2001, he was awarded with the Merit Cross 1st Class. Pemper's adopted city of Augsburg awarded him a civic medal in 2003. They also named him as an honorary citizen in 2007.

Pemper submitted to an in-depth film interview in Vienna in June 2005 for UK company Gigatel Cyf (Ltd). Pemper spoke at great length about his experience from childhood to the aftermath of his experiences during the Holocaust, specifically at the Płaszów concentration camp under the control of Płaszów's commandant Amon Göth. Pemper only agreed to the interview after relentless persuasion for over 18 months by another Holocaust survivor named Edward Mosberg, who was himself imprisoned at the Płaszów, Mauthausen, and Linz camps. Some of the contents of this unique interview are included in the (UK 2016) – (US 2017) release of the Film – Destination Unknown and includes testimony not included in Pemper's autobiography The Road To Rescue. The Road to Rescue was published on 11 March 2011, shortly before Pemper's death.

A four-hour-long interview of Pemper (in German) is also available online on the USC Shoah Foundation website. The interview, conducted on 13 September 1997, covers the period before and during his captivity, and reveals details about Göth and Schindler.

Pemper died in Augsburg, Germany on 7 June 2011, at the age of 91. He never married and left no close family. He was buried in Augsburg's Jewish cemetery and municipal flags were lowered to half-staff in his honour. In tribute to Pemper, Augsburg's mayor Kurt Gribl said, "With Mietek Pemper, the city has lost an important builder of bridges between the Jewish and Christian religions and a contributor to reconciliation."
