= Buscher =

Buscher is a German surname. Notable people with the surname include:

- Alma Buscher (1899–1944), German designer
- Arnold Büscher (1899–1949), German SS concentration camp commandant executed for war crimes
- Brian Buscher (born 1981), American baseball player
- Gérard Buscher (born 1960), French football player and manager, father of Mickaël
- Mickaël Buscher (born 1987), French footballer, son of Gérard
- Misty Buscher, American politician from Illinois
- Paula Buscher, American college basketball coach

== See also ==
- Buescher (or Büscher)
