= Oskar Schindler =

German industrialist and humanitarian (1908–1974)

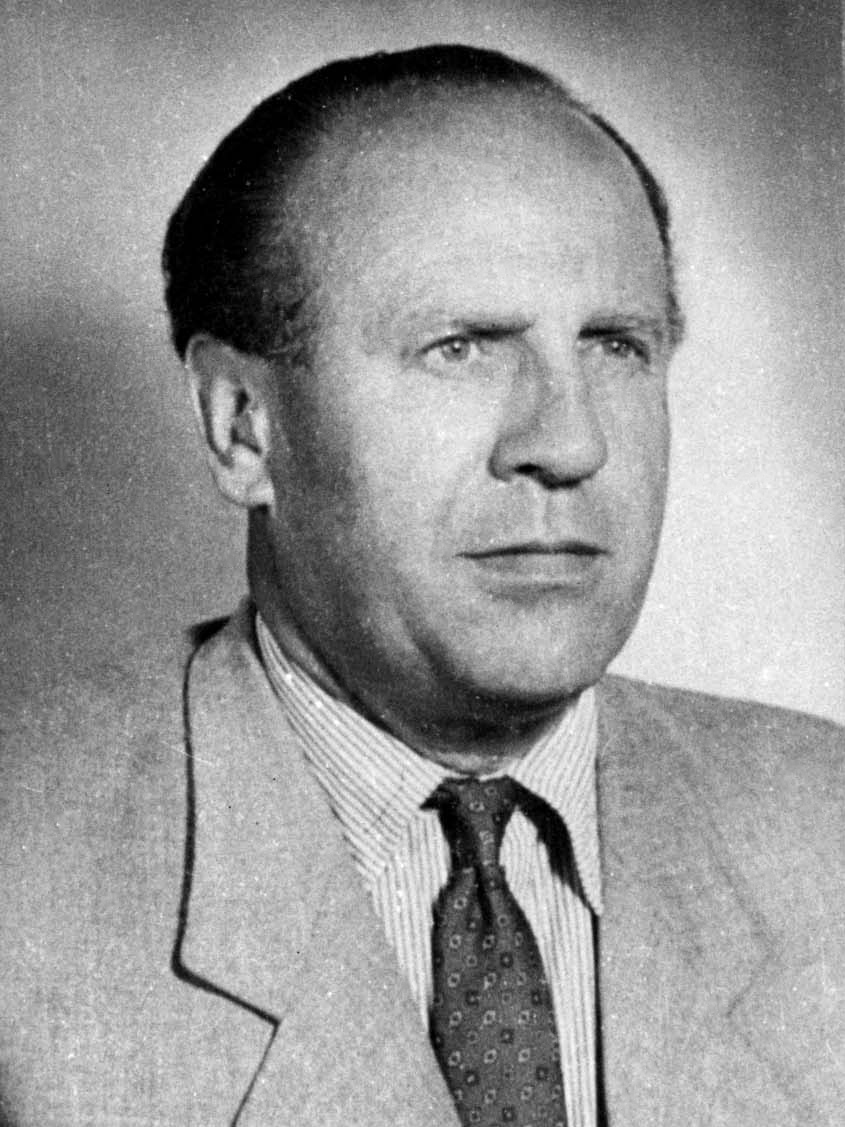
- Born: 28 April 1908; Zwittau, Austria-Hungary
- Died: 9 October 1974 (aged 66); Hildesheim, Lower Saxony, West Germany
- Resting place: Mount Zion Catholic Cemetery, Jerusalem, Israel; 31°46′12.5″N 35°13′49.4″E
- Occupation: Industrialist
- Known for: Saving 1,200 Jews during the Holocaust
- Political party: Sudeten German Party (1935–1938); Nazi Party (1939–1945)
- Spouse: Emilie Pelzl (m. 1928)
- Children: 2
- Honours: Righteous Among the Nations (1993)

Oskar Schindler (German: [ˈɔskaʁ ˈʃɪndlɐ]; 28 April 1908 – 9 October 1974) was a German industrialist and humanitarian who is credited with saving the lives of 1,200 Jews during the Holocaust by employing them in his enamelware and ammunitions factories in German-occupied Poland and the Protectorate of Bohemia and Moravia. He is the subject of the 1982 novel Schindler's Ark and its 1993 film adaptation, Schindler's List.

Schindler grew up in Zwittau, Moravia, and worked in several trades until he joined the Abwehr, the military intelligence service of Nazi Germany, in 1936. Before the beginning of the German occupation of Czechoslovakia in 1938, he collected information on railways and troop movements for the German government. He was arrested for espionage by the Czechoslovak government but was released under the terms of the Munich Agreement that year. He continued to collect information for the Nazis, working in Poland in 1939 before the invasion of Poland at the start of the Second World War. He joined the Nazi Party in 1939. That same year, he acquired an enamelware factory in Kraków, Poland, which employed at its peak in 1944 about 1,750 workers, of whom 1,000 were Jews. His Abwehr connections helped him protect his Jewish workers from deportation and death in the Nazi concentration camps. As time went on, he had to give Nazi officials ever larger bribes and gifts of luxury items obtainable only on the black market to keep his workers safe.

By July 1944, Germany was losing the war; the Schutzstaffel (SS) began closing down the easternmost concentration camps and deporting the remaining prisoners westward. Many were murdered at the Auschwitz concentration camp and the Gross-Rosen concentration camp. Schindler convinced Amon Göth, SS-Hauptsturmführer commandant of the nearby Kraków-Płaszów concentration camp, to allow him to move his factory to Brněnec (German: Brünnlitz, Czech: Brněnec) in the Protectorate of Bohemia and Moravia, thus sparing his workers from almost certain death in the gas chambers of Auschwitz. Using names provided by a Jewish Ghetto Police officer named Marcel Goldberg, Göth's secretary Mietek Pemper compiled and typed the list of 1,200 Jews who travelled to Brünnlitz in October 1944. Schindler continued to bribe SS officials to prevent his workers' execution until the end of the Second World War in Europe in May 1945, by which time he had spent his entire fortune on bribes and black market purchases of supplies for his workers.

Schindler moved to West Germany after the war, where he was supported financially by Jewish relief organisations. After receiving a partial reimbursement for his wartime expenses, he moved with his wife, Emilie, to Argentina, where they took up farming. When they went bankrupt in 1958, Schindler left his wife and returned to Germany, where he failed at several business ventures and relied on financial support from Schindlerjuden ("Schindler Jews")—the people whose lives he had saved during the war. He died on 9 October 1974 in Hildesheim, Germany, and was buried in Jerusalem on Mount Zion, the only former member of the Nazi Party to be honoured in this way. Oskar and Emilie Schindler were named Righteous Among the Nations by Yad Vashem in 1993.

== Early life and education ==
Schindler was born on 28 April 1908, into a Sudeten German family in the city of Zwittau, then part of the Margraviate of Moravia within Austria-Hungary. His father was Johann "Hans" Schindler, the owner of a farm machinery business, and his mother was Franziska "Fanny" Schindler (née Luser). His sister, Elfriede, was born in 1915. After attending primary and secondary school, Schindler enrolled in a technical school, from which he was expelled in 1924 for forging his report card. He later graduated but did not take the abitur exams that would have enabled him to go to university. Instead, he took courses in Brno in several trades, including chauffeuring and machinery, and worked for his father for three years. A motorcycle enthusiast since his youth, he bought a 250-cc Moto Guzzi racing motorcycle and competed recreationally in mountain races for the next few years.

On 6 March 1928, Schindler married Emilie Pelzl, daughter of a prosperous Sudeten German farmer from Maletein. They moved in with Oskar's parents and occupied the upstairs rooms, where they lived for seven years. Soon after marriage, Schindler quit working for his father and took a series of jobs, including a position at Moravian Electrotechnic and the management of a driving school. After an 18-month stint in the Czech army, where he rose to the rank of lance corporal in the Tenth Infantry Regiment of the 31st Army, he returned to Moravian Electrotechnic, which went bankrupt shortly afterward. His father's farm machinery business closed around the same time, leaving Schindler unemployed for a year. He took a job with Jaroslav Šimek Bank of Prague in 1931, where he worked until 1938.

Schindler was arrested several times in 1931 and 1932 for public drunkenness. Around this time, he had an affair with Aurelie Schlegel, a school friend. They had a daughter, Emily, in 1933, and a son, Oskar Jr., in 1935. Schindler later claimed the boy was not his son. Schindler's father, an alcoholic, abandoned his wife in 1935. She died a few months later after a long illness.

== Spy for the Abwehr ==
Schindler joined the separatist Sudeten German Party in 1935. Although a citizen of Czechoslovakia, Schindler became a spy for the Abwehr, the military intelligence service of Nazi Germany, in 1936. He was assigned to Abwehrstelle II Commando VIII, based in Breslau. He later told Czech police that he did it because he needed the money; by this time, Schindler had a drinking problem and was chronically in debt.

His tasks for the Abwehr included collecting information on railways, military installations and troop movements, as well as recruiting other spies within Czechoslovakia in advance of Nazi Germany's planned invasion. He was arrested by the Czech government for espionage on 18 July 1938 and immediately imprisoned; he was released as a political prisoner under the terms of the Munich Agreement, the instrument under which the Czech Sudetenland was annexed by Germany on 1 October. Schindler applied for membership in the Nazi Party on 1 November and was accepted the following year.

After some time off to recover in Zwittau, Schindler was promoted to second in command of his Abwehr unit and relocated with his wife to Ostrava (Ostrau), on the Czech–Polish border, in January 1939. He was involved in espionage in the months leading up to Hitler's seizure of the remainder of Czechoslovakia in March. Emilie helped him with paperwork, processing and hiding secret documents in their apartment for the Abwehr office. As Schindler frequently travelled to Poland on business, he and his 25 agents were in a position to collect information about Polish military activities and railways for the planned invasion of Poland. One assignment called for his unit to monitor and provide information about the railway line and tunnel in the Jablunkov Pass, deemed critical for the movement of German troops. Schindler continued to work for the Abwehr until as late as fall 1940, when he was sent to Turkey to investigate corruption among the Abwehr officers assigned to the German embassy there.

== World War II ==
=== Emalia ===
Schindler first arrived in Kraków (Krakau) in October 1939 on Abwehr business and took an apartment the following month. Emilie maintained the apartment in Ostrava and visited Oskar in Kraków at least once a week. In November 1939, he contacted interior decorator Mila Pfefferberg to decorate his new apartment. Her son, Leopold "Poldek" Pfefferberg, soon became one of his contacts for black market trading. They eventually became lifelong friends.

The same month, Schindler was introduced to Itzhak Stern, an accountant for Schindler's fellow Abwehr agent Josef "Sepp" Aue, who had taken over Stern's formerly-Jewish-owned place of employment as a Treuhänder (trustee). Property belonging to Polish Jews, including their possessions, places of business, and homes, were seized by the Germans beginning immediately after the invasion, and Jewish citizens were stripped of their civil rights. Schindler showed Stern the balance sheet of a company he was thinking of acquiring, an enamelware factory called Rekord Ltd (Note: The full name of the company was Pierwsza Małopolska Fabryka Naczyń Emaliowanych i Wyrobów Blaszanych "Rekord".) owned by a consortium of Jewish businessmen that had filed for bankruptcy earlier that year. Stern advised him that rather than running the company as a trusteeship under the auspices of the Haupttreuhandstelle Ost (Main Trustee Office for the East), he should buy or lease the business, as that would give him more freedom from the Nazis' dictates, including freedom to hire more Jews.

With the financial backing of several Jewish investors, including one of the owners, Abraham Bankier, Schindler signed an informal lease agreement on the factory on 13 November 1939 and formalised the arrangement on 15 January 1940. (Note: He bought the business outright on 26 June 1942.) He renamed it Deutsche Emailwarenfabrik (German Enamelware Factory) or DEF, and it soon became known by the nickname "Emalia". He initially acquired a staff of seven Jewish workers (including Bankier, who helped him manage the company) and 250 non-Jewish Poles. At its peak in 1944, the business employed around 1,750 workers, a thousand of whom were Jews. Schindler also helped run Schlomo Wiener Ltd, a wholesale outfit that sold his enamelware, and was leaseholder of Prokosziner Glashütte, a glass factory.

Schindler's ties with the Abwehr and his connections in the Wehrmacht and its Armaments Inspectorate enabled him to obtain contracts to produce enamel cookware for the military. These connections also later helped him protect his Jewish workers from deportation and death. As time went on, Schindler had to give Nazi officials ever larger bribes and gifts of luxury items obtainable only on the black market to keep his workers safe. Bankier, a key black market connection, obtained goods for bribes as well as extra materials for use in the factory. Schindler enjoyed a lavish lifestyle and pursued extramarital relationships with his secretary, Viktoria Klonowska, and Eva Kisch Scheuer, a merchant specialising in enamelware from DEF. Emilie Schindler visited for a few months in 1940 and moved to Kraków to live with Oskar in 1941.

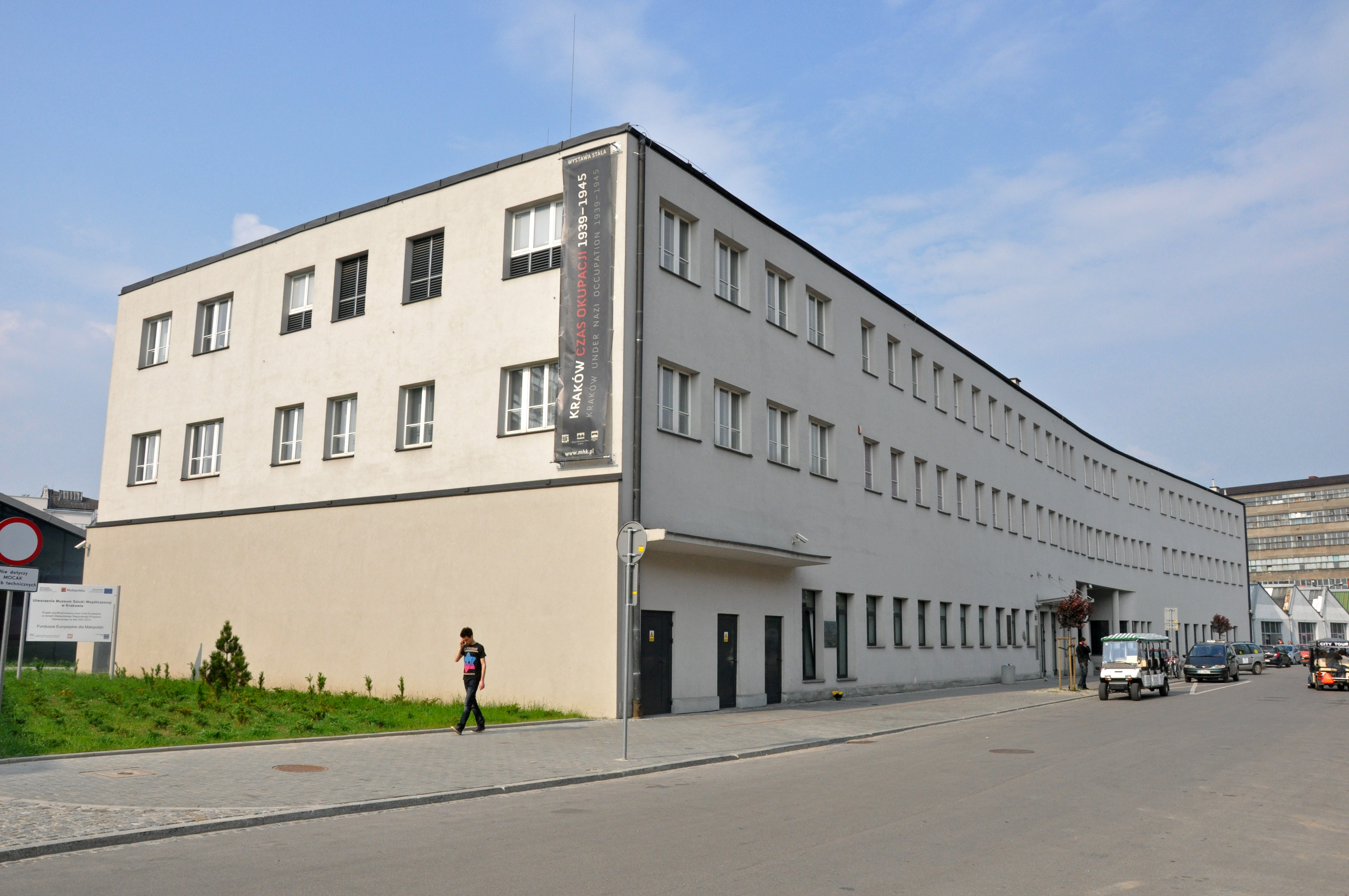
Schindler's factory in Kraków, 2011

Initially, Schindler was mostly interested in the business's money-making potential and hired Jews because they were cheaper than Poles—the wages were set by the occupying Nazi regime. Later, however, he began shielding his workers without regard for cost. The status of his factory as a business essential to the war effort became a decisive factor in enabling him to protect his Jewish workers. Whenever Schindlerjuden (Schindler Jews) were threatened with deportation, he claimed exemptions for them. He claimed wives, children, and even people with disabilities were necessary mechanics and metalworkers. On one occasion, the Gestapo came to Schindler demanding that he hand over a family that possessed forged identity papers. "Three hours after they walked in," Schindler said, "two drunk Gestapo men reeled out of my office without their prisoners and without the incriminating documents they had demanded."

On 1 August 1940, Governor-General Hans Frank issued a decree requiring all Kraków Jews to leave the city within two weeks. Only those who had jobs directly related to the German war effort would be allowed to stay. Of the 60,000 to 80,000 Jews then living in the city, only 15,000 remained by March 1941. These Jews were then forced to leave their traditional neighbourhood of Kazimierz and relocate to the walled Kraków Ghetto, established in the industrial Podgórze district. Schindler's workers travelled on foot to and from the ghetto each day to their jobs at the factory. Enlargements to the facility in the four years Schindler was in charge included the addition of an outpatient clinic, co-op, kitchen, and dining room for the workers, in addition to expansion of the factory and its related office space.

=== Płaszów ===
In the autumn of 1941, the Nazis began transporting Jews out of the ghetto. Most of them were sent to the Bełżec extermination camp and murdered. On 13 March 1943 the ghetto was liquidated, and those still fit for work were sent to the new concentration camp at Płaszów. Several thousand not deemed fit for work were sent to extermination camps and murdered; hundreds more were murdered on the streets by the Nazis as they cleared out the ghetto. Aware of the plans because of his Wehrmacht contacts, Schindler had his workers stay at the factory overnight to protect them from harm. He witnessed the ghetto's liquidation and was appalled. From that point, says Schindlerjude Sol Urbach, Schindler "changed his mind about the Nazis. He decided to get out and to save as many Jews as he could."

The Płaszów concentration camp opened in March 1943 on the former site of two Jewish cemeteries on Jerozilimska Street, about 2.5 kilometres (1.6 mi) from the DEF factory. In charge of the camp was SS-Hauptsturmführer Amon Göth, a sadist who shot inmates at random. Płaszów's inmates lived in constant fear for their lives. Emilie Schindler called Göth "the most despicable man I have ever met."

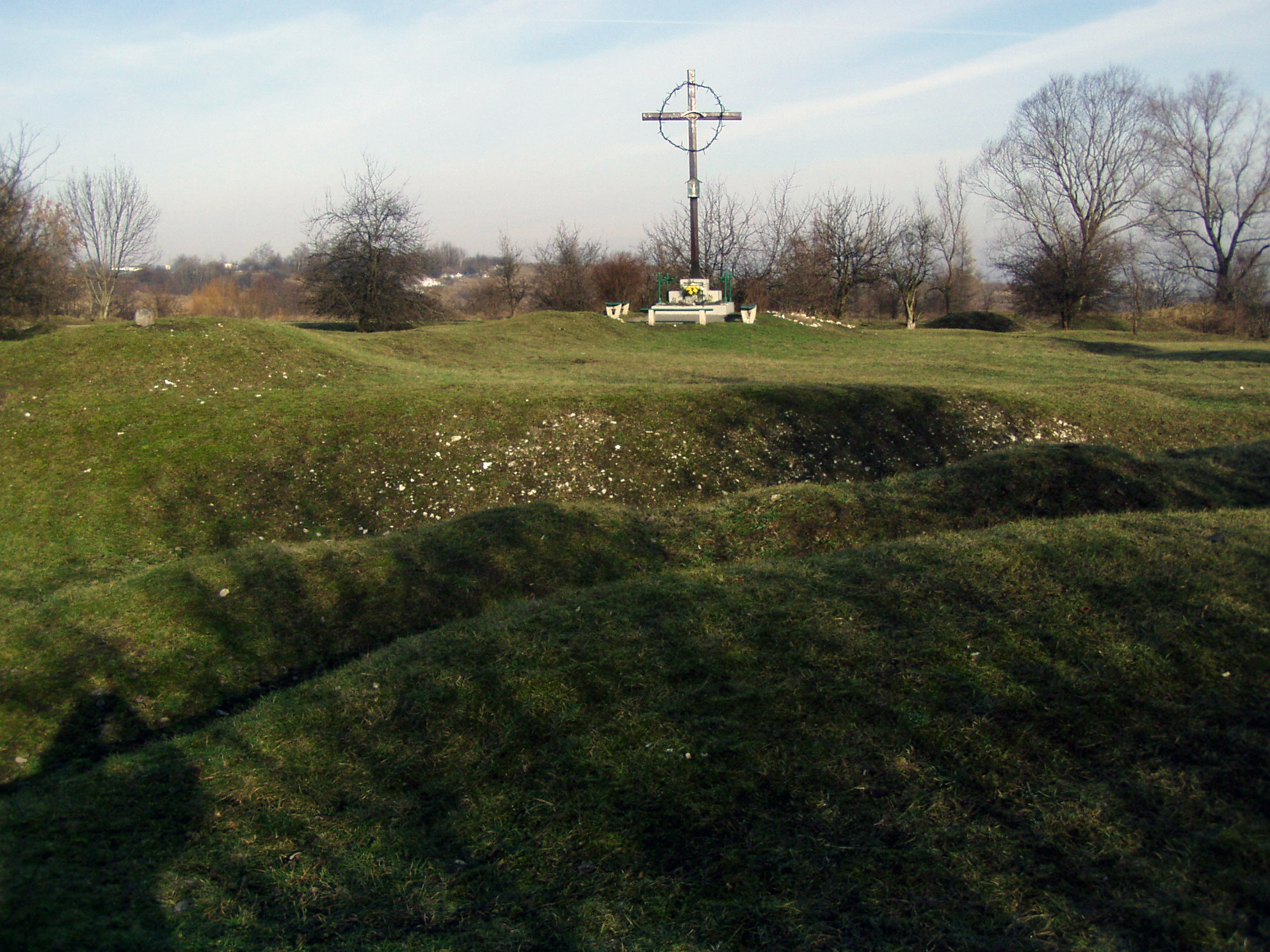
Hujowa Górka ("Prick Hill"), the execution place in Kraków-Płaszów concentration camp (2007)

Göth's plan was that all the factories, including Schindler's, should be moved inside the camp gates. But with a combination of diplomacy, flattery, and bribery, Schindler not only prevented his factory from being moved, but convinced Göth to allow him to build (at Schindler's own expense) a subcamp at Emalia to house his workers and 450 Jews from other nearby factories. There they were safe from the threat of random execution, well fed and housed, and permitted to undertake religious observances.

Schindler was arrested twice on suspicion of black market activities and once for breaking the Nuremberg Laws by kissing a Jewish girl, an action forbidden by the Race and Resettlement Act. The first arrest, in late 1941, led to him being kept overnight. His secretary arranged for his release through Schindler's influential contacts in the Nazi Party. His second arrest, on 29 April 1942, was the result of his kissing a Jewish girl on the cheek at his birthday party at the factory the previous day. He remained in jail five days before his influential Nazi contacts could obtain his release. In October 1944 he was arrested again, accused of black marketeering and bribing Göth and others to improve the conditions of the Jewish workers. He was held for nearly a week and released. Göth had been arrested on 13 September 1944 for corruption and other abuses of power, and Schindler's arrest was part of the ongoing investigation into Göth's activities. Göth was never convicted on those charges.

In 1943, Schindler was contacted by Zionist leaders in Budapest via members of the Jewish resistance movement. He travelled to Budapest several times to report in person on Nazi mistreatment of the Jews. He brought back funding provided by the Jewish Agency for Palestine and turned it over to the Jewish underground.

=== Brünnlitz ===
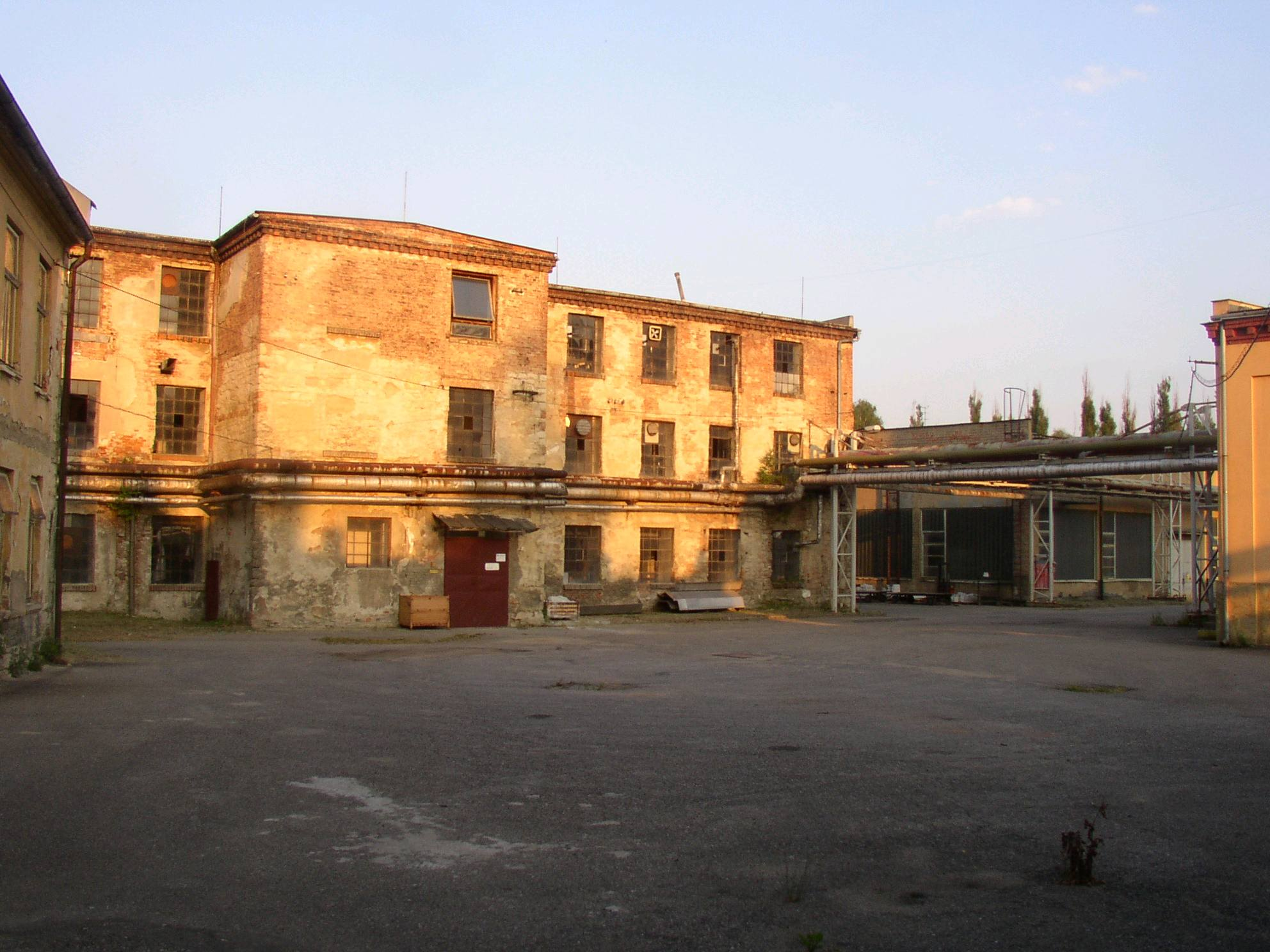
Schindler's factory at the former site of Brünnlitz labour camp in 2004

As the Red Army of the Soviet Union drew nearer in July 1944, the SS began closing down the easternmost concentration camps and evacuating the remaining prisoners westward to Auschwitz and Gross-Rosen concentration camp. Göth's personal secretary, Mietek Pemper, alerted Schindler to the Nazis' plans to close all factories not directly involved in the war effort, including Schindler's. Pemper suggested to Schindler that production be switched from cookware to anti-tank grenades in an effort to save the Jewish workers' lives. Using bribery and his powers of persuasion, Schindler convinced Göth and the officials in Berlin to allow him to move his factory and his workers to Brünnlitz (Czech: Brněnec), in the Sudetenland, thus sparing them from certain death in the gas chambers. Using names provided by Jewish Ghetto Police officer Marcel Goldberg, Pemper compiled and typed the list of 1,200 Jews—1,000 of Schindler's workers and 200 inmates from Julius Madritsch's textiles factory—who were sent to Brünnlitz in October 1944.

On 15 October 1944, a train carrying 700 men on Schindler's list was initially sent to the concentration camp at Gross-Rosen, where the men spent about a week before being rerouted to the factory in Brünnlitz. Three hundred female Schindlerjuden were similarly sent to Auschwitz, where they were in imminent danger of being sent to the gas chambers. Schindler's usual connections and bribes failed to win their release. Finally, after he sent his secretary, Hilde Albrecht, with bribes of black market goods, food and diamonds, the women were sent to Brünnlitz after several harrowing weeks in Auschwitz.

In addition to workers, Schindler moved 250 wagonloads of machinery and raw materials to the new factory. Few if any useful artillery shells were produced at the plant. When officials from the Armaments Ministry questioned the factory's low output, Schindler bought finished goods on the black market and resold them as his own. The rations provided by the SS were insufficient to meet the workers' needs, so Schindler spent most of his time in Kraków obtaining food, armaments, and other materials. His wife Emilie remained in Brünnlitz, surreptitiously obtaining additional rations and caring for the workers' health and other basic needs.

Schindler also arranged for the transfer of as many as 3,000 Jewish women out of Auschwitz to small textiles plants in the Sudetenland in an effort to increase their chances of surviving the war. In January 1945, a trainload of 250 Jews who had been rejected as workers at a German mine in Goleschau in occupied Poland arrived at Brünnlitz. The boxcars were frozen shut when they arrived, and Emilie waited while an engineer from the factory opened them with a soldering iron. Twelve people were dead in the cars, and the remainder were too ill and feeble to work. Emilie took the survivors into the factory and cared for them in a makeshift hospital until the end of the war. Schindler continued to bribe SS officials to prevent the slaughter of his workers as the Red Army approached. On 7 May 1945 he and his workers gathered on the factory floor to listen to British Prime Minister Winston Churchill announce over the radio that Germany had surrendered and that the war in Europe was over.

== After the war ==
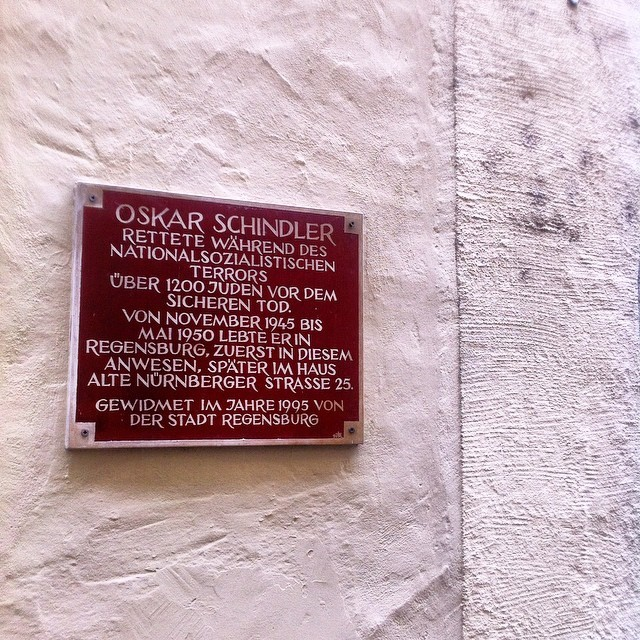
Memorial plaque on the house where Schindler lived in Regensburg. As seen in 2015

As a member of the Nazi Party and the Abwehr intelligence service, Schindler was in danger of being arrested by the Allied powers and charged as a war criminal. Bankier, Stern, and several others prepared a statement he could present to the Americans attesting to his role in saving Jewish lives.

After the liquidation of the Płaszów camp, the Schindlerjuden decided to give Schindler a memento. The original investors in the enamel factory canvassed the workers for ideas. Knowing there were several jewellers among their group, a man named Simon Yeret, formerly a prosperous timber merchant, offered a gold bridge from his own mouth. The bridge was removed and its metal melted with a few scavenged silver coins. A jeweller named Jozef Gross cut a section of lead pipe and created a master signet ring out of which the gold version would be cast. Gross shaved two cuttlebones flat and squeezed the lead master mould between them until an impression had been pressed into the mould. This was filled with the gold from Yeret's bridge. Gross then filed and polished the gold ring. He engraved a paraphrase from the Talmud in Hebrew on the ring that said, "Whoever saves one life saves the world entire." (Note: The inscription is a compressed version of a precept in the Talmud; see Talmud § Saving a life at Wikiquote.) Despite his mixed feelings about Schindler's character, Gross kept the cuttlebone mould and lead master for the rest of his life. They are currently housed at the Melbourne Holocaust Museum. The whereabouts of the actual ring have long been unknown, nor is it clear what Schindler did with it after the war.

=== Escape to the American lines ===
To escape capture by the Soviets, Schindler and his wife departed westward in their vehicle, a two-seater Horch, initially with several fleeing German soldiers riding on the running boards. A truck containing Schindler's mistress Marta, several Jewish workers, and a load of black market trade goods followed. Soviet troops confiscated the Horch at the city of České Budějovice, which the Soviets had already captured. The Schindlers were unable to recover a diamond Oskar had hidden under the seat. They continued by train and on foot until they reached the American lines at Lenora and then travelled to Passau, where an American Jewish officer arranged for them to travel to Switzerland by train. They moved to Bavaria in Germany in late 1945.

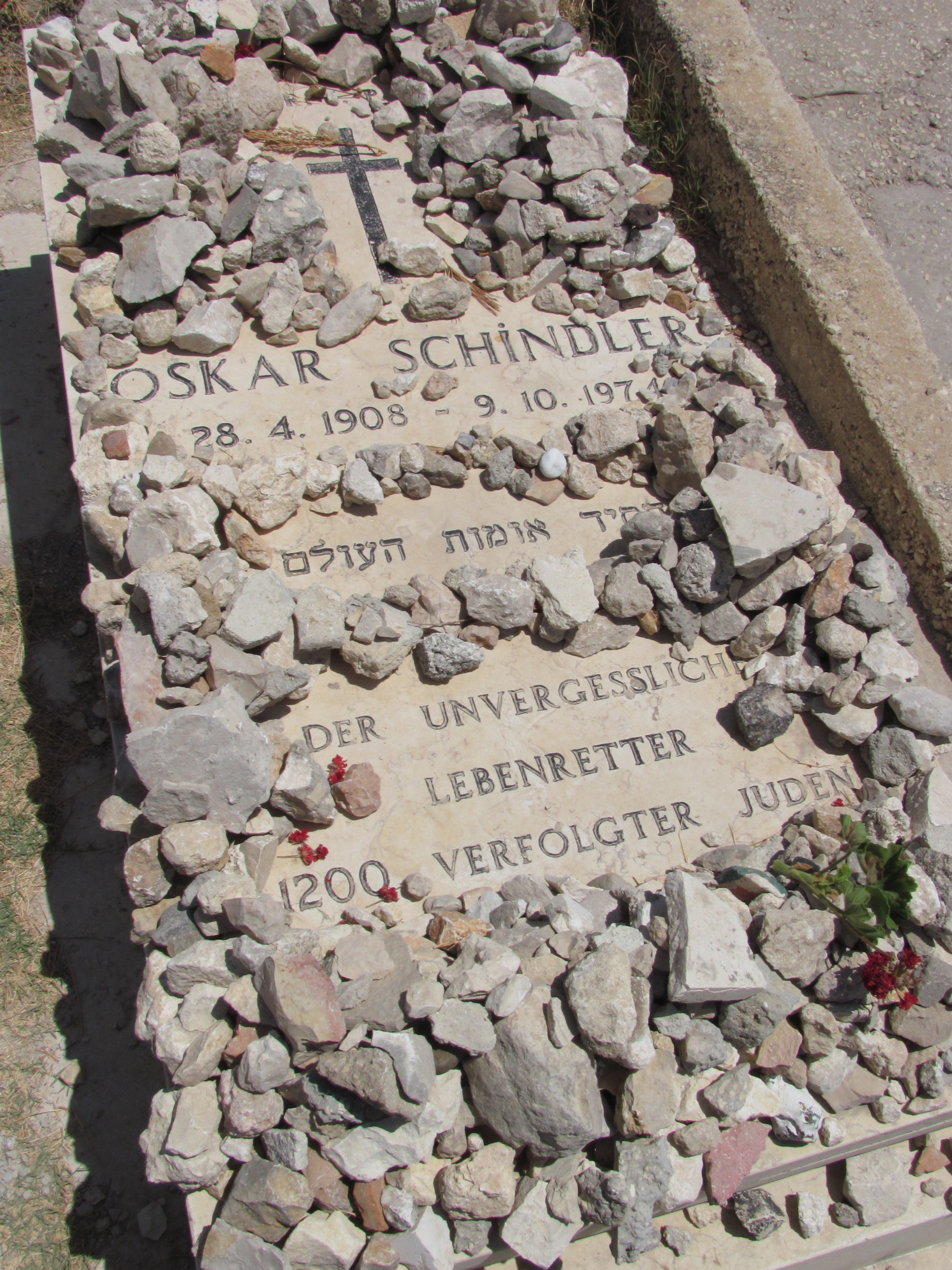
Schindler's grave in Jerusalem. The Hebrew inscription reads: "Righteous Among the Nations"; the German inscription reads: "The Unforgettable Lifesaver of 1200 Persecuted Jews".

By the end of the war, Schindler had spent his entire fortune on bribes and black market purchases of supplies for his workers. Virtually destitute, he moved briefly to Regensburg and later Munich but did not prosper in post-war Germany. He was reduced to receiving assistance from Jewish organisations. In 1948, he presented a claim for reimbursement of his wartime expenses to the American Jewish Joint Distribution Committee and received US$15,000. He estimated his expenditures at over $1,056,000, including the costs of camp construction, bribes, and black market goods, including food.

In 1949, Schindler emigrated to Argentina, where he tried raising chickens and then nutria (coypu), a small animal raised for its fur. When the business went bankrupt in 1958, he left his wife and returned to Germany, where he had a series of unsuccessful business ventures, including a cement factory. He declared bankruptcy in 1963 and suffered a heart attack the next year, which led to a month-long hospital stay. Remaining in contact with many of the Jews he had met during the war, including Stern and Pfefferberg, Schindler survived on donations sent by Schindlerjuden from all over the world.

For his work during the war, on 8 May 1962, Yad Vashem invited Schindler to a ceremony in which a carob tree was planted in his honour on the Avenue of the Righteous. Schindler received awards for his efforts, including the German Order of Merit in 1966. Schindler died of liver failure on 9 October 1974. He is buried in Jerusalem on Mount Zion, possibly the only member of the Nazi Party to be honoured in this way. On 24 June 1993, he and his wife were named Righteous Among the Nations, an award the State of Israel bestows on non-Jews who took an active role in rescuing Jews during the Holocaust. Schindler, along with Karl Plagge, Georg Ferdinand Duckwitz, Helmut Kleinicke, and Hans Walz is among the few Nazi Party members to be given this award.

The writer Herbert Steinhouse, who interviewed Schindler in 1948, wrote: "Schindler's exceptional deeds stemmed from just that elementary sense of decency and humanity that our sophisticated age seldom sincerely believes in. A repentant opportunist saw the light and rebelled against the sadism and vile criminality all around him." In a 1983 television documentary, Schindler is quoted as saying: "I felt that the Jews were being destroyed. I had to help them; there was no choice." In the former Czechoslovakia, his reputation is mixed, as he is negatively remembered for his service in the Abwehr and for his support of German separatism in the Sudetenland.

== Legacy ==
=== Films and book ===
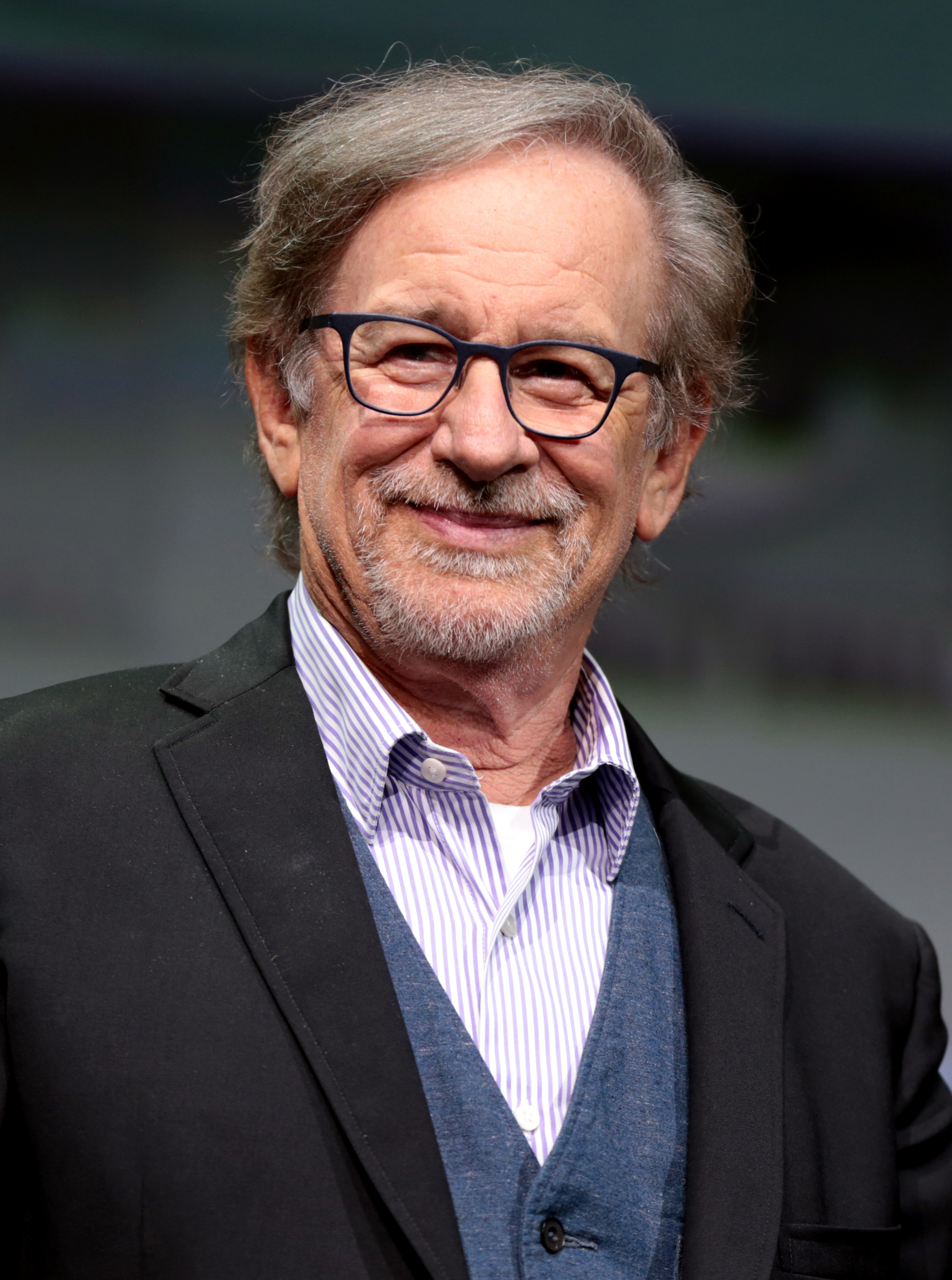
Steven Spielberg, director of Schindler's List

In 1951, Poldek Pfefferberg approached the Austrian filmmaker Fritz Lang and asked him to consider making a film about Schindler. Also on Pfefferberg's initiative, in 1964 Schindler received a US$20,000 (equivalent to $208,000 in 2025) advance from MGM for a proposed film treatment titled To the Last Hour. Neither film was made, and Schindler quickly spent the money he received from MGM. He was also approached in the 1960s by MCA of Germany and Walt Disney Productions in Vienna, but again nothing came of these projects.

In 1980, the Australian author Thomas Keneally by chance visited Pfefferberg's luggage store in Beverly Hills, California, while en route home from a film festival in Europe, and Pfefferberg told him Schindler's story. He gave Keneally copies of some materials he had on file, and Keneally decided to make a fictionalised treatment of the story. After extensive research and interviews with surviving Schindlerjuden, he wrote his historical novel Schindler's Ark (published in the United States as Schindler's List), which was released in 1982.

The novel was adapted as the 1993 movie Schindler's List by the American film director Steven Spielberg. Although Spielberg had acquired the film rights ten years earlier, he did not feel he was emotionally or professionally ready to tackle it, and he offered the project to several directors. Later, after reading a script for the project prepared by Steven Zaillian for Martin Scorsese, he decided to trade him Cape Fear for the opportunity to do the Schindler biopic. In the film, the character Itzhak Stern (played by Ben Kingsley) is a composite of Stern, Bankier and Pemper. Liam Neeson was nominated for the Academy Award for Best Actor for his portrayal of Schindler, and the film won seven Oscars, including Best Picture.

Other film treatments include a 1983 British television documentary produced by Jon Blair for Thames Television, Schindler: His Story as Told by the Actual People He Saved (released in the US in 1994 as Schindler: The Real Story), and a 1998 A&E Biography special, Oskar Schindler: The Man Behind the List.

=== Schindler's suitcase ===
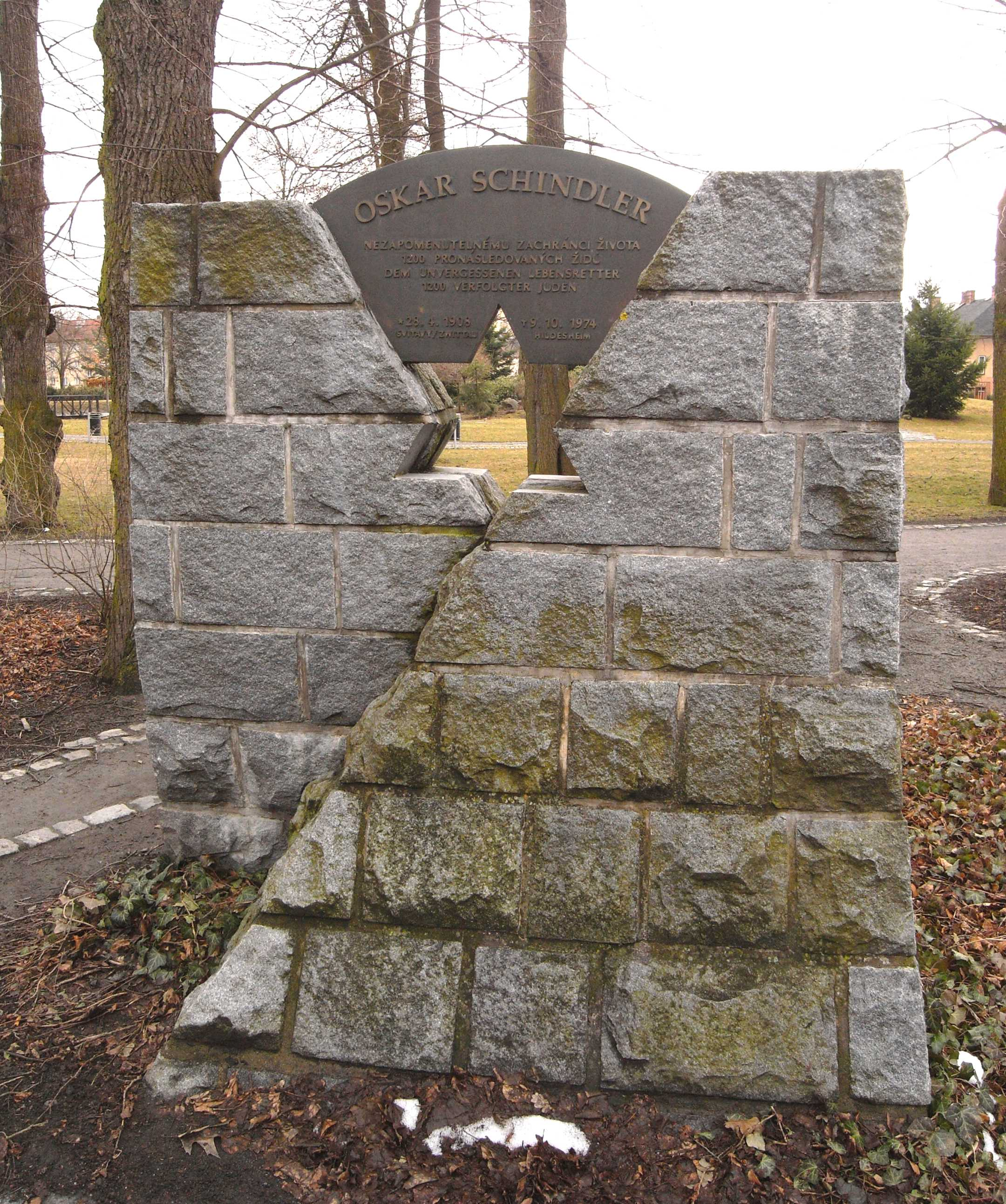
Schindler's memorial in Svitavy, Czechia, his birthplace

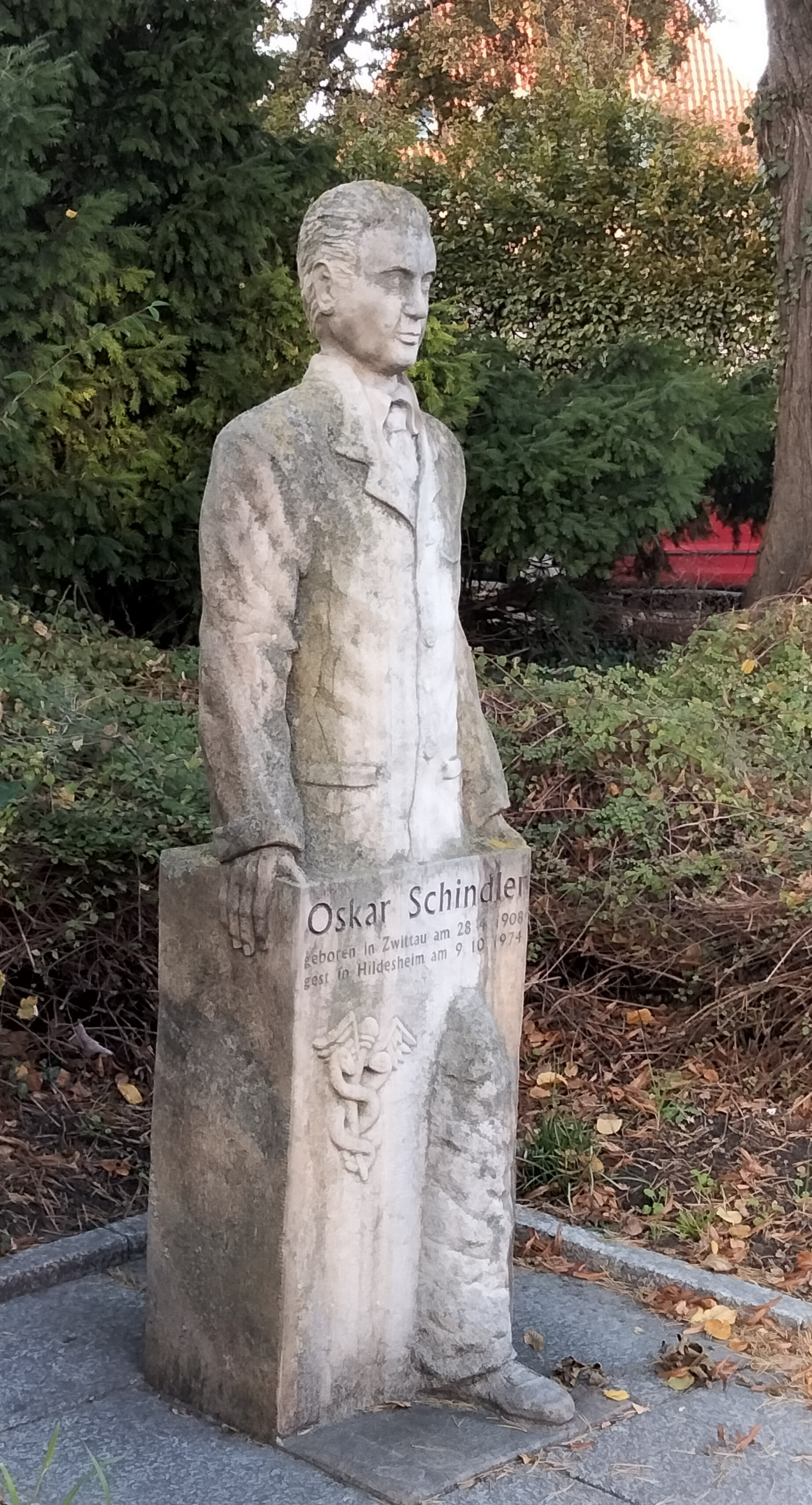
Schindler's memorial in Hildesheim, where he died in 1974

In 1997, a suitcase belonging to Schindler containing historic photographs and documents was discovered in the attic of the apartment of Ami and Heinrich Staehr in Hildesheim. Schindler had stayed with the couple for a few days shortly before his death in 1974. Staehr's son Chris took the suitcase to Stuttgart, where the documents were examined in detail in 1999 by Wolfgang Borgmann, science editor of the Stuttgarter Zeitung. Borgmann wrote a series of seven articles that appeared in the paper from 16 to 26 October 1999 and were eventually published in book form as Schindlers Koffer: Berichte aus dem Leben eines Lebensretters; eine Dokumentation der Stuttgarter Zeitung (Schindler's Suitcase: Reports from the Life of a Lifesaver). The documents and suitcase were sent to the Holocaust museum at Yad Vashem in Israel for safekeeping in December 1999.

=== Copies of the list ===
In early April 2009, a carbon copy of one version of the list was discovered at the State Library of New South Wales by workers combing through boxes of materials collected by Keneally. The 13-page document, yellow and fragile, was filed among research notes and original newspaper clippings. The document was given to Keneally in 1980 by Pfefferberg when he was persuading him to write Schindler's story. This version of the list contains 801 names and is dated 18 April 1945; Pfefferberg is listed as worker number 173. Several authentic versions of the list exist, because the names were retyped several times as conditions changed in the hectic days at the end of the war. One of four existing copies of the list was offered at a ten-day auction starting on 19 July 2013 on eBay at a reserve price of US$3 million. It received no bids.

=== Museum ===
Attempts to convert the factory site in Brněnec to a museum initially failed due to a lack of financial support- though it was proclaimed a protected memorial site in November 2016. However, after receiving additional funds from the regional government in Brněnec and from the European Union, the site opened as a museum in May 2025 on the 80th anniversary of VE day.

=== Other memorabilia ===
In August 2013, a one-page letter signed by Schindler on 22 August 1944 sold in an online auction for US$59,135. The letter noted Schindler's permission for a factory supervisor to move machinery to Czechoslovakia. The same unknown auction buyer had previously purchased 1943 construction documents dated Feb. 2,1943 of Schindler's Kraków munitions factory for $63,426 which included architectural drawings and calculations regarding the cost of construction for the large, hangar-like building.

== See also ==
- Rescue of Jews during the Holocaust
- List of Righteous Among the Nations by country
- List of Germans who resisted Nazism
- List of Schindlerjuden
