= Kraków-Płaszów concentration camp =

German Nazi concentration camp in Poland (1942–1945)

Płaszów concentration camp near Kraków
- German Nazi concentration camp
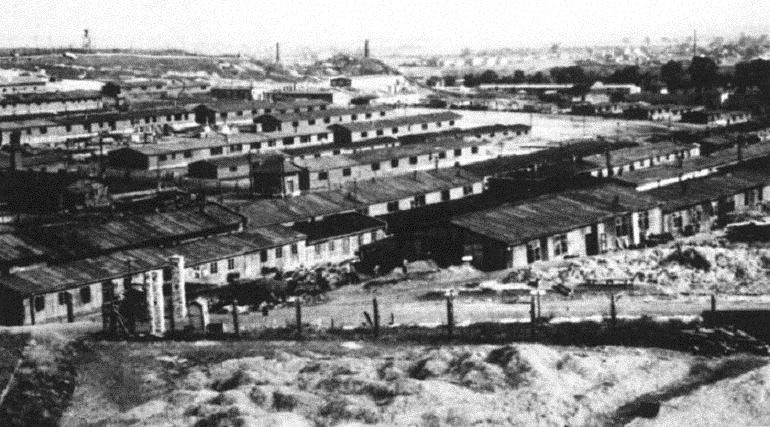
- German concentration camp in 1942
- Coordinates: 50°01′57″N 19°57′49.5″E
- Other names: German: Konzentrationslager Plaszow bei Krakau
- Operated by: Nazi Germany
- Commandant: Amon Göth (until September 1944); Arnold Büscher (September 1944 – January 1945)
- Operational: 28 October 1942 – January 1945
- Liberated by: Red Army, 20 January 1945
- Website: https://plaszow.org/en/history-of-the-camp

Płaszów (Polish pronunciation: [ˈpwaʂuf]), officially named Płaszów concentration camp near Kraków (German: Konzentrationslager Plaszow bei Krakau), was a German Nazi concentration camp operated by the SS in the area of Podgórze and Wola Duchacka near Płaszów, a southern suburb of Kraków, in the General Governorate of German-occupied Poland. Most of the prisoners were Polish Jews who were targeted for destruction by Nazi Germany during the Holocaust. Many prisoners died because of executions, forced labor, and the poor conditions in the camp. The camp was evacuated in January 1945, before the Red Army's liberation of the area on 20 January.

== History ==
Major Nazi German concentration camps in occupied Poland (marked with squares)

Originally intended as a forced labour camp, the Płaszów concentration camp was constructed on the grounds of two Jewish cemeteries (old and new Jewish cemeteries in Podgórze). It was populated with prisoners during the liquidation of the Kraków Ghetto, which took place on 13–14 March 1943 with the first deportations of the Barrackenbau Jews from the Ghetto beginning 28 October 1942. In 1943 the camp was expanded and integrated into the Nazi concentration camp system as a main camp.

== Camp operation ==
=== Structure and function ===
The Kraków-Płaszów concentration camp was divided into multiple sections. There was a separate area for camp personnel, work facilities, male prisoners, female prisoners, and a further subdivision between Jews and non-Jews. Although separated, men and women still managed to have contact with one another. There was also a private barracks for the camp's Jewish police and their families. While the primary function of the camp was forced labor, the camp was also the site of mass murder of inmates as well as prisoners brought in from the outside. The main targets were the elderly and the sick. There were no gas chambers or crematoria, so mass murder was carried out by shootings.

=== Personnel ===
Under Arnold Büscher, the camp's second commandant, prisoners did not experience any shootings or hangings. However, by 1943, the camp was notorious for its terrors. Amon Göth, an SS commandant from Vienna, was the camp commandant at this point. He was sadistic in his treatment and killing of prisoners. "Witnesses say he would never start his breakfast without shooting at least one person." On Göth's first day as camp commandant, he killed two Jewish policemen and made every camp inmate watch. On 13 March 1943, he oversaw the liquidation of the nearby Kraków Ghetto, forcing those Jewish inhabitants deemed capable of work into the KL Płaszów camp. Those who were declared unfit for work were either sent to Auschwitz or shot on the spot. People were told to leave their children behind and that they would be cared for. In reality, they were all put in an orphanage and killed. Others snuck their children into the camp. If a prisoner tried to escape the camp, Göth shot 10 prisoners as a punishment. Göth would also release his Great Danes on prisoners if he did not like their expressions. He oversaw a staff that was mostly non-German. It consisted of 206 Ukrainian SS personnel from the Trawniki, 600 Germans of the SS-Totenkopfverbände (1943–1944), and a few SS women, including Gertrud Heise, Luise Danz and Alice Orlowski.

The female guards treated the prisoners as brutally as the men: "When we were loaded on the train in Płaszów, an SS woman hit me on the head. They were so vicious and brutal and sadistic, more than men. I think because some of them were women and you expect kindness, it was shocking. But of course, some were fat and big and ugly."

Jewish police were recruited by the camp personnel. They were provided with double rations of thick soup, as opposed to the standard watery soup, and a full loaf of uncontaminated bread. However, the benefits came with cost of having to whip inmates with the whips that the Nazis provided.

On 13 September 1944, Göth was relieved of his position and charged by the SS with theft of Jewish property (which belonged to the state, according to Nazi legislation), failure to provide adequate food to the prisoners under his charge, violation of concentration camp regulations regarding the treatment and punishment of prisoners, and allowing unauthorised access to camp personnel records by prisoners and non-commissioned officers. Camp administration was assumed by SS-Obersturmführer Arnold Büscher. He improved the inmates' diets by allowing eggs, sugar and powdered milk.

=== Prisoner victims ===
==== Life in the camp ====
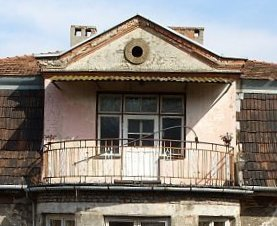
The balcony of Amon Göth's villa in Płaszów. Although Göth was ruthless and would shoot at prisoners, he could not do so from this balcony as the terrain and the layout of the camp infrastructure precluded this. He used to step outside to hunt humans, with his Tyrolean hat marking his intentions. It was the signal for seasoned prisoners to attempt to hide.

The camp was an Arbeitslager ("labour camp"), supplying forced labour to several armament factories and to a stone quarry. Most of the prisoners were Polish Jews. There were also high numbers of women and children compared with other camps. A large degree of the Hungarian prisoners were women. The death rate in the camp was very high. Many prisoners died of typhus, starvation, and from executions. Because the work facilities were designed for men, the women had a lower chance of survival. Płaszów camp became particularly infamous for both the individual and the mass shootings carried out at Hujowa Górka: a large hill close to the camp commonly used for executions. Some 8,000 deaths took place outside the camp's fences, with prisoners trucked in three to four times weekly. The covered lorries from Kraków would arrive in the morning. The condemned were walked into a trench of the Hujowa Górka hillside, ordered to strip down and stand naked, and then were finally shot. Their bodies were then covered with dirt, layer upon layer. During these mass shootings, all other inmates were forced to watch. In early 1944, all corpses were exhumed and burned on a pyre to obliterate the evidence of the mass murder. Witnesses later testified that 17 truckloads of human ashes were removed from the burning site and scattered over the area.

Although food was scarce, inmates that possessed any number of zlotys could buy extra food. A food for food trading system also developed. For example, two portions of soup was equal to a half loaf of bread.

When Göth received notice of a new shipment of inmates, he would set up deportations for Auschwitz. On 14 May 1944 Göth ordered all children to be sent to the "kindergarten". This turned out only to be a precursor to deportation to Auschwitz on 15 May where the children were all gassed.

Göth entrusted documents pertaining to the mass killings and executions to a high ranking female member of the SS, Kommandoführerin Alice Orlowski. She held these documents in her possession until the end of the war, then allegedly destroyed them. Orlowski was known for her whippings, especially of young women across their eyes. At roll call she would walk through the lines of women and whip them.

==== Outside aid ====
Prisoners could also rely on outside help to some degree. The Jüdische Unterstützungsstelle, a support group that the Germans tolerated, would provide the inmates with food and medical assistance. The Zehnerschaft was a group of women that also supported the inmates. The Polish Welfare Organization sent food to Polish prisoners and some of them shared with the Jewish inmates. There were also individuals such as Stanislaw Dobrowolski, the head of the Kraków branch of the Council for Aid to Jews (Żegota), and Tadeusz Pankiewicz, a famous pharmacist, also aided the prisoners.

==== Punishments ====
Göth and the other camp personnel punished inmates for a variety of actions. Any action perceived as sabotage, such as smuggling items into the camp, disobeying orders, or carrying an extra piece of food in one's clothes was an offense punishable by death. Prisoners were warned that if they tried to escape, every member of their family and even innocent strangers would be killed. In terms of methods for killing, death by hanging was a favored method of Göth's. For a standard punishment, twenty-five lashings were dealt to the guilty inmate's buttocks.

==== Hope for the prisoners ====
While prisoners' daily lives were dominated by fear and starvation, there were some outlets for hope of survival. Rumors involving the Russian advancement that would lead to the camp's liberation always circulated. Oskar Schindler, a member of the Nazi Party who saved the 1,200 Schindlerjuden, was also a key figure. While prisoners always feared a transport to Auschwitz, one that was always sought after was a transport to Brünnlitz labor camp in Czechoslovakia. This is where Oskar Schindler's enamel factory was located. Schindler was known for being compassionate towards Jews. He never hit anyone, was always kind, and smiled frequently around the workers. Having relatives and friends that worked for Schindler gave one a better chance at being put on the list for transport.

==== Hiding the evidence ====
During July and August 1944, a number of transports of prisoners left KL Płaszów for Auschwitz, Stutthof, Flossenburg, Mauthausen, and other camps. In January 1945, the last of the remaining inmates and camp staff left the camp on a death march to Auschwitz. Several female SS guards were part of the group that accompanied them. Many of those who survived the march were killed upon arrival. When the Nazis realized the Soviets were approaching Kraków, they completely dismantled the camp, leaving only an empty field. All bodies that had been previously buried in various mass graves were exhumed and burned on site. On 20 January 1945, the Red Army arrived and found only a patch of barren land.

=== Aftermath ===
Most numbers of inmates and killings rely on estimation, as the prisoner card index was destroyed during the camp's destruction. Few postwar trials centered on crimes committed at the Kraków-Płaszów concentration camp; one exception was Göth's trial and subsequent death sentence. West German prosecutors took until the late 1950s to investigate these crimes.

== Commemoration ==
The area which held the camp now consists of sparsely wooded hills and fields, with one large memorial to all the victims and two smaller monuments (one to the Jewish victims generally, and another to the Hungarian Jewish victims) at one perimeter of where the camp once stood. The Jewish cemetery, where the Nazis removed all but one of the tombstones, stands on the side of the hill at the eastern end of the camp, near the Grey house. Amon Göth's villa remains there. Another small monument, located near the opposite end of the site, stands in memory of the first execution of (non-Jewish) Polish prisoners in 1939.

A version of the camp is featured in the movie Schindler's List (1993), about the life of Oskar Schindler. As the Płaszów area is now a nature preserve and modern high-rise apartments were visible from the site, the director Steven Spielberg replicated the camp in the nearby Liban Quarry, which also served as a labor camp during the war.

Each year, it is the finishing point of the March of Remembrance taking part in mid-March to manifest the respect to the victims of the Holocaust.

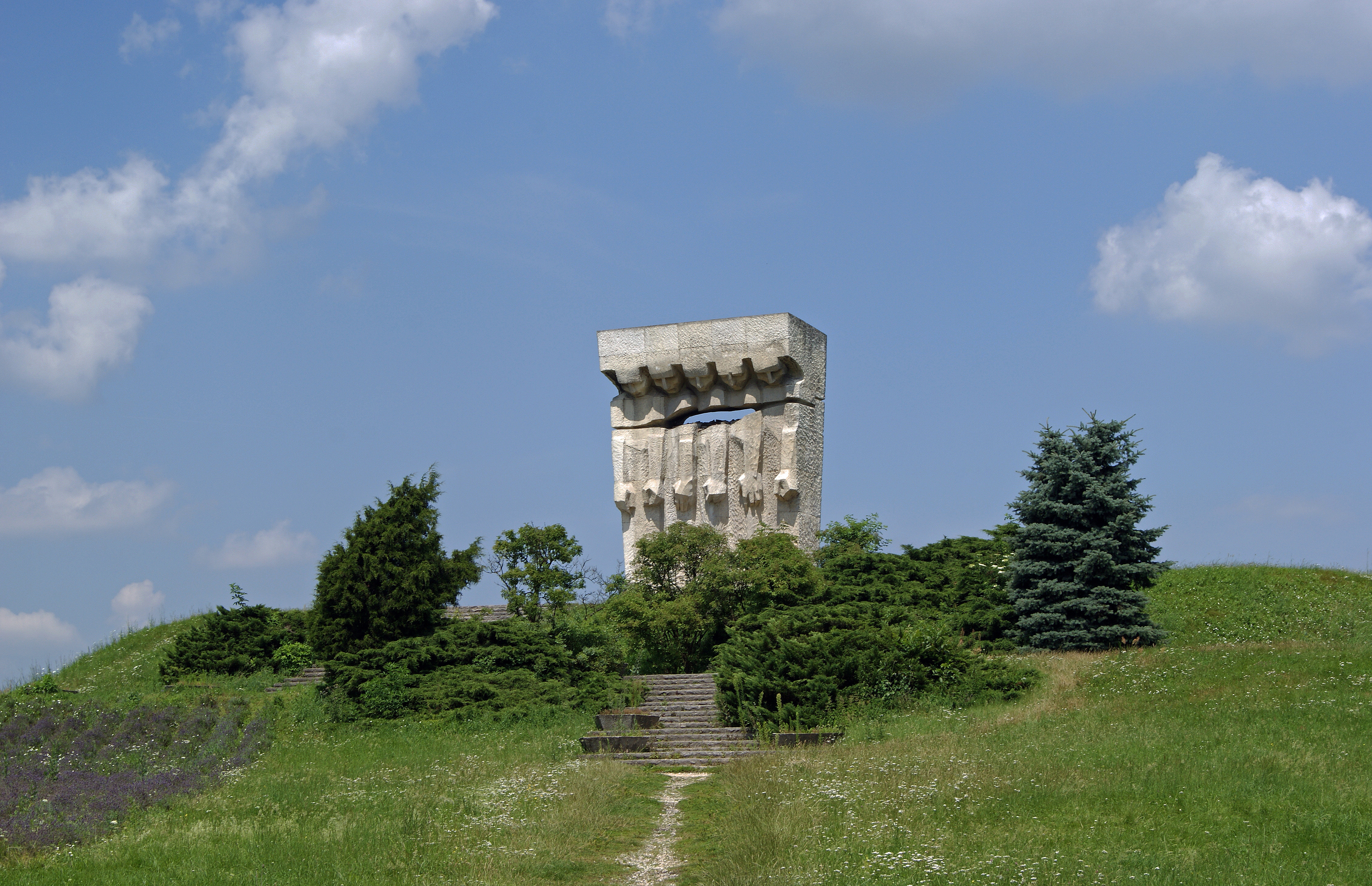
Monument to the Victims of Fascism (erected in 1964)

Płaszów camp memorial

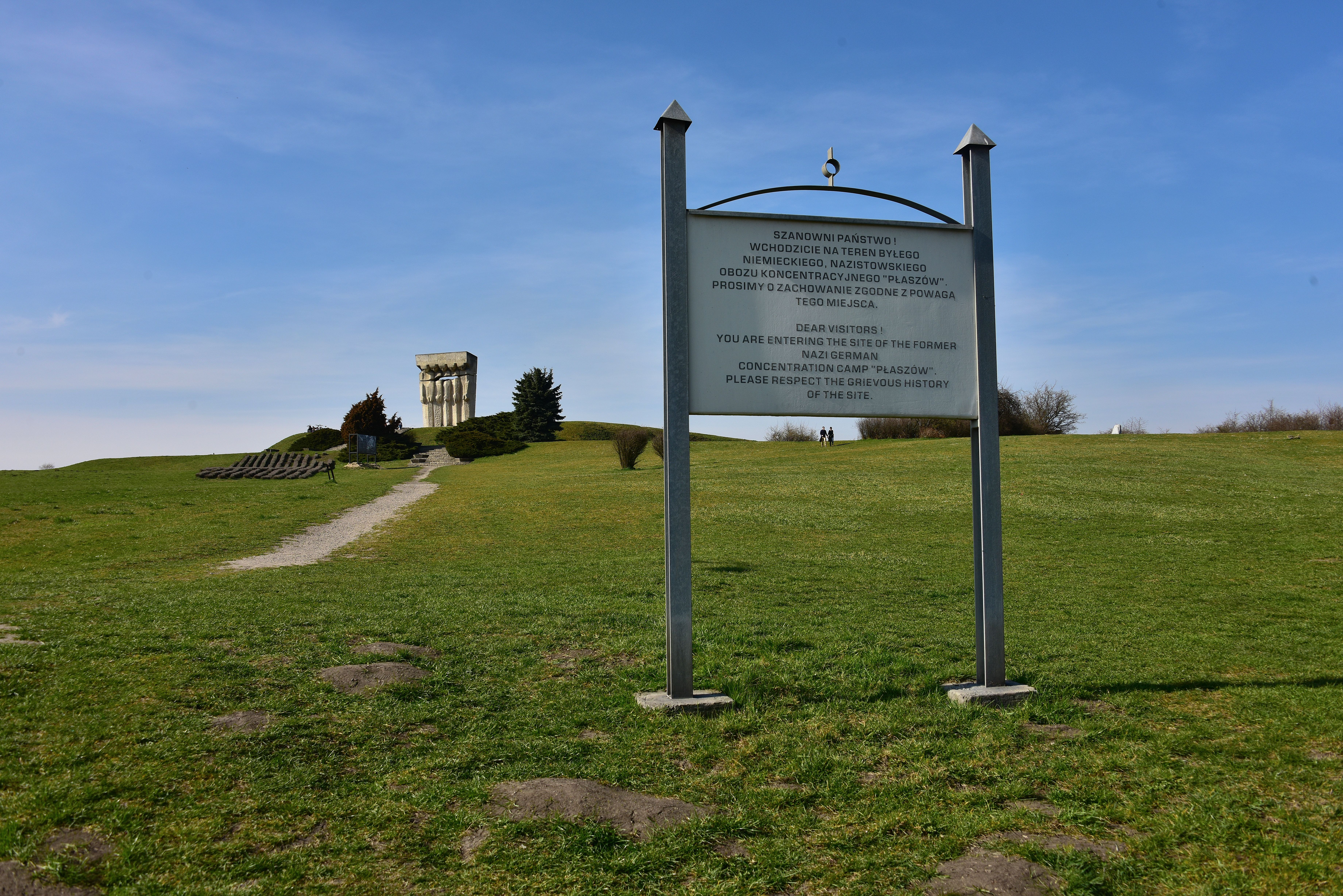
The sign at the south entrance to the Płaszów camp area

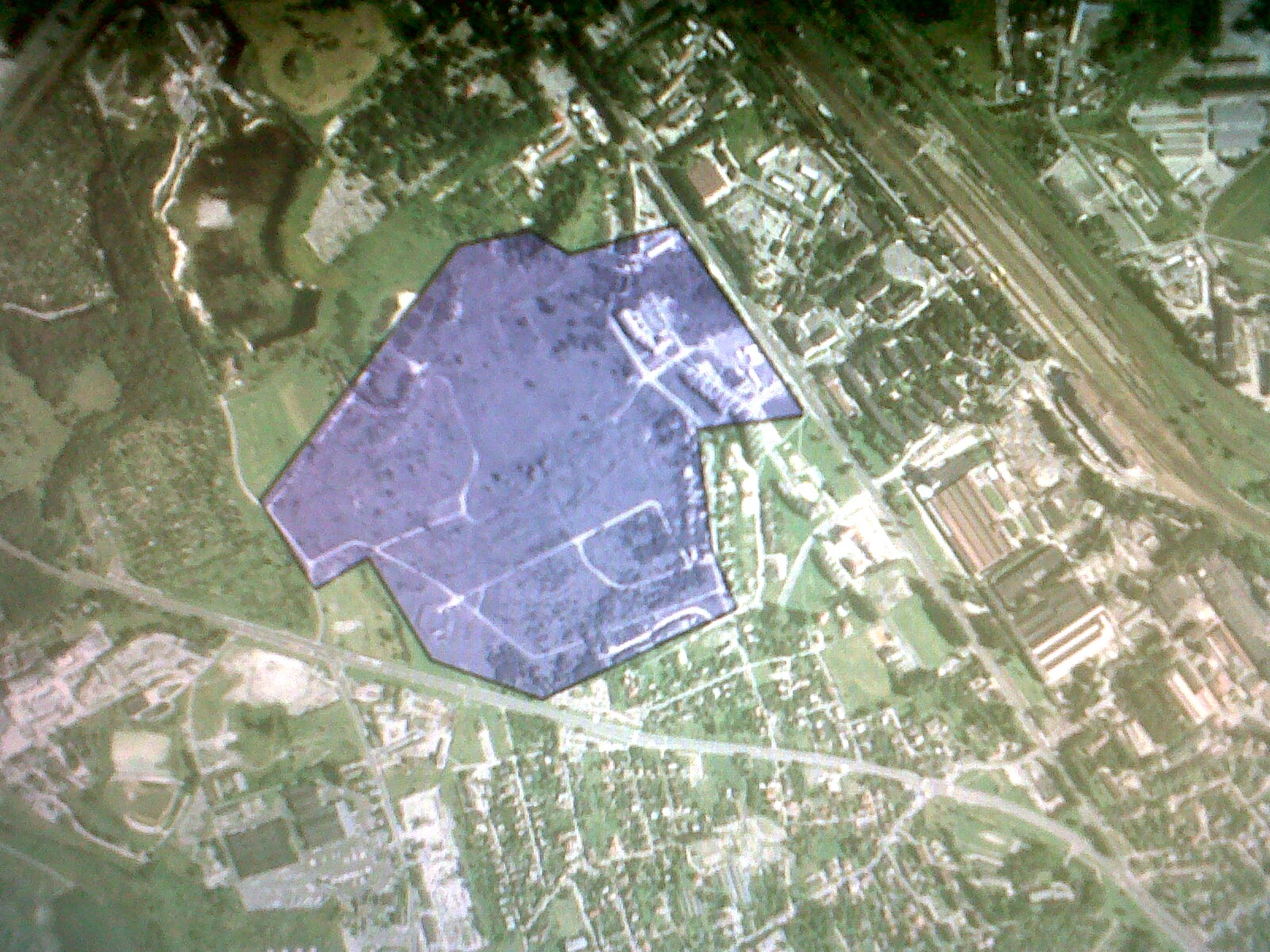
Aerial shot, 2012

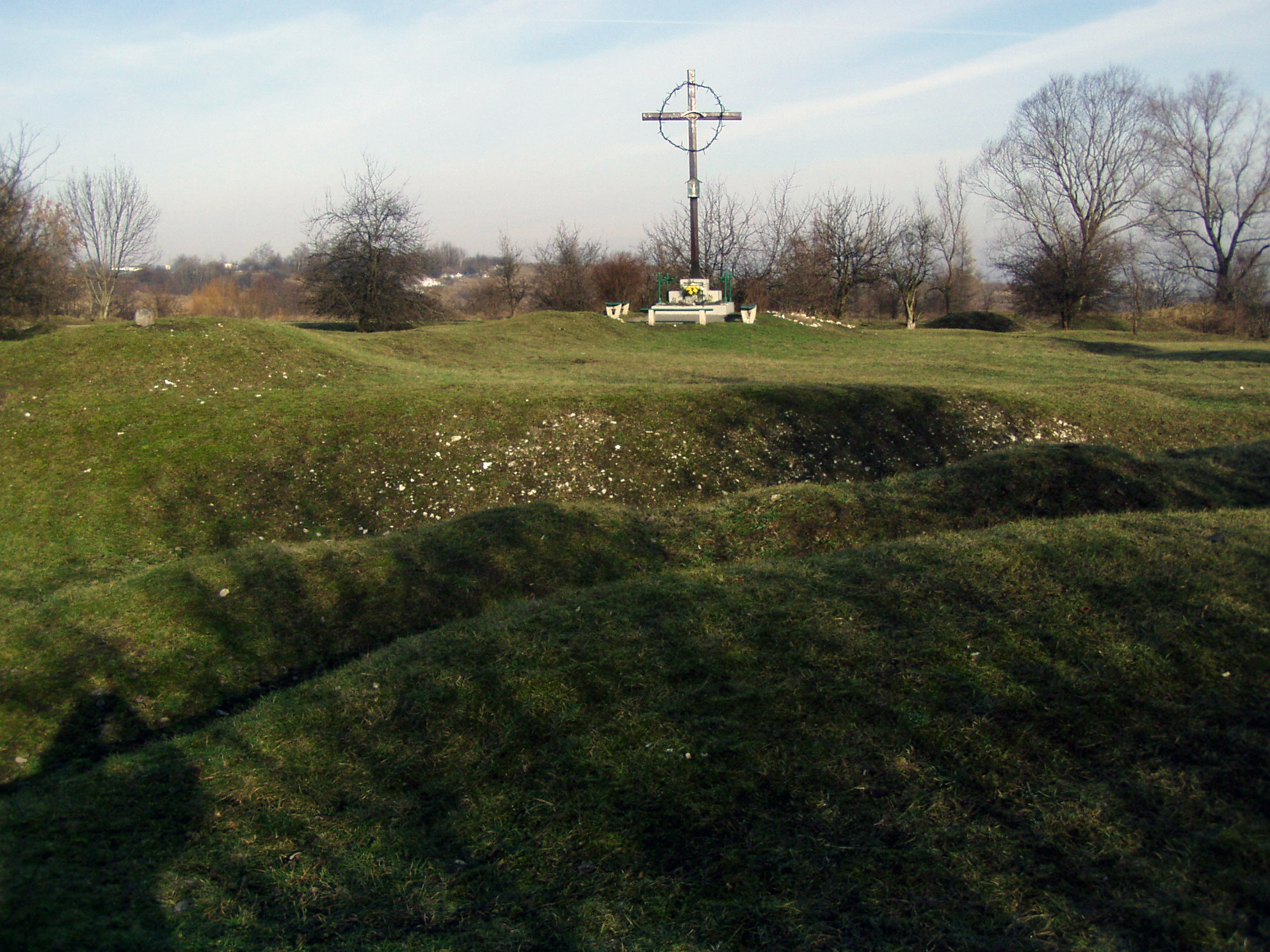
Hujowa Górka, the place where the Germans carried out executions, 2008

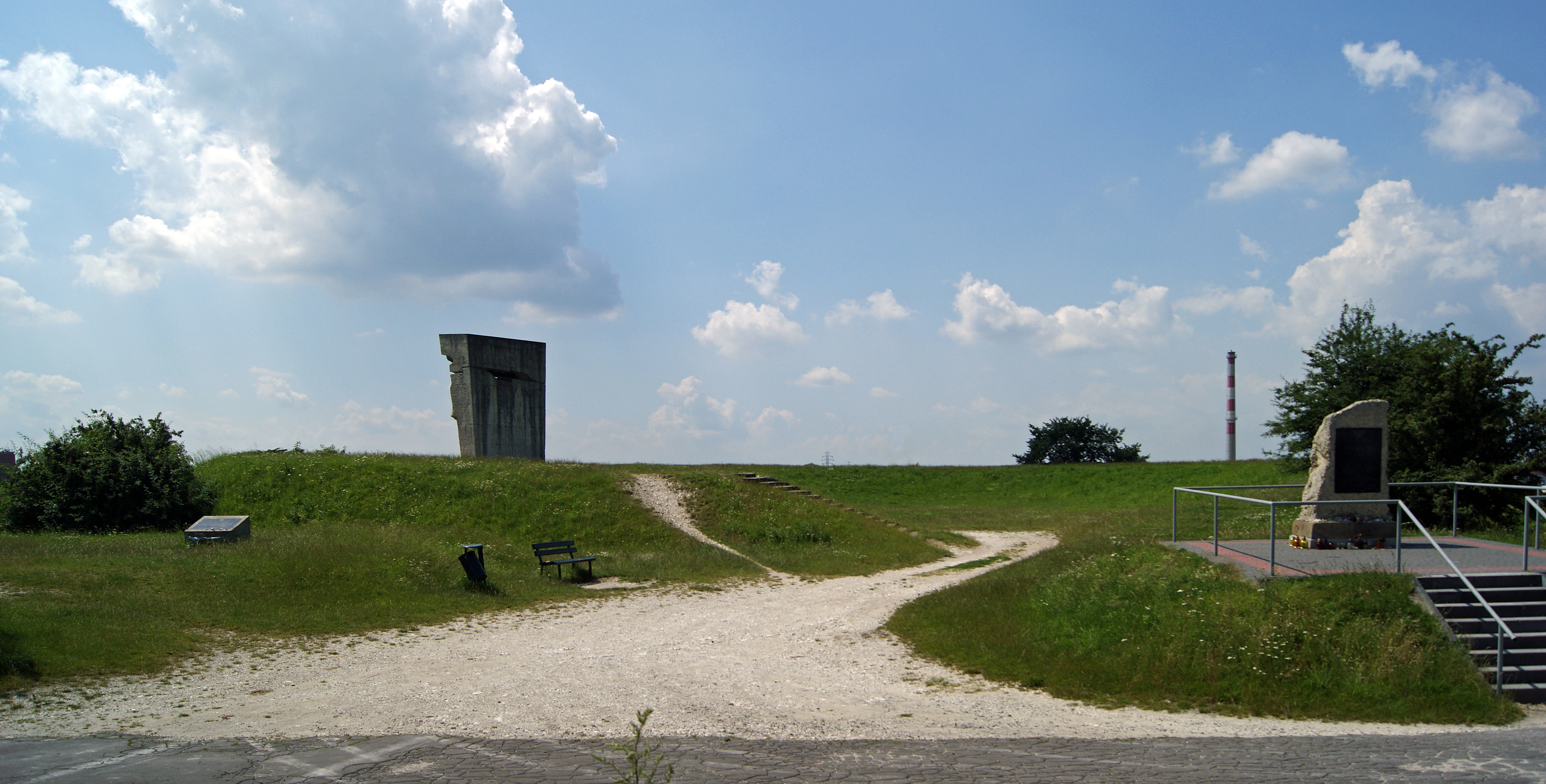
C-dołek, the place where the Germans carried out executions, 2013

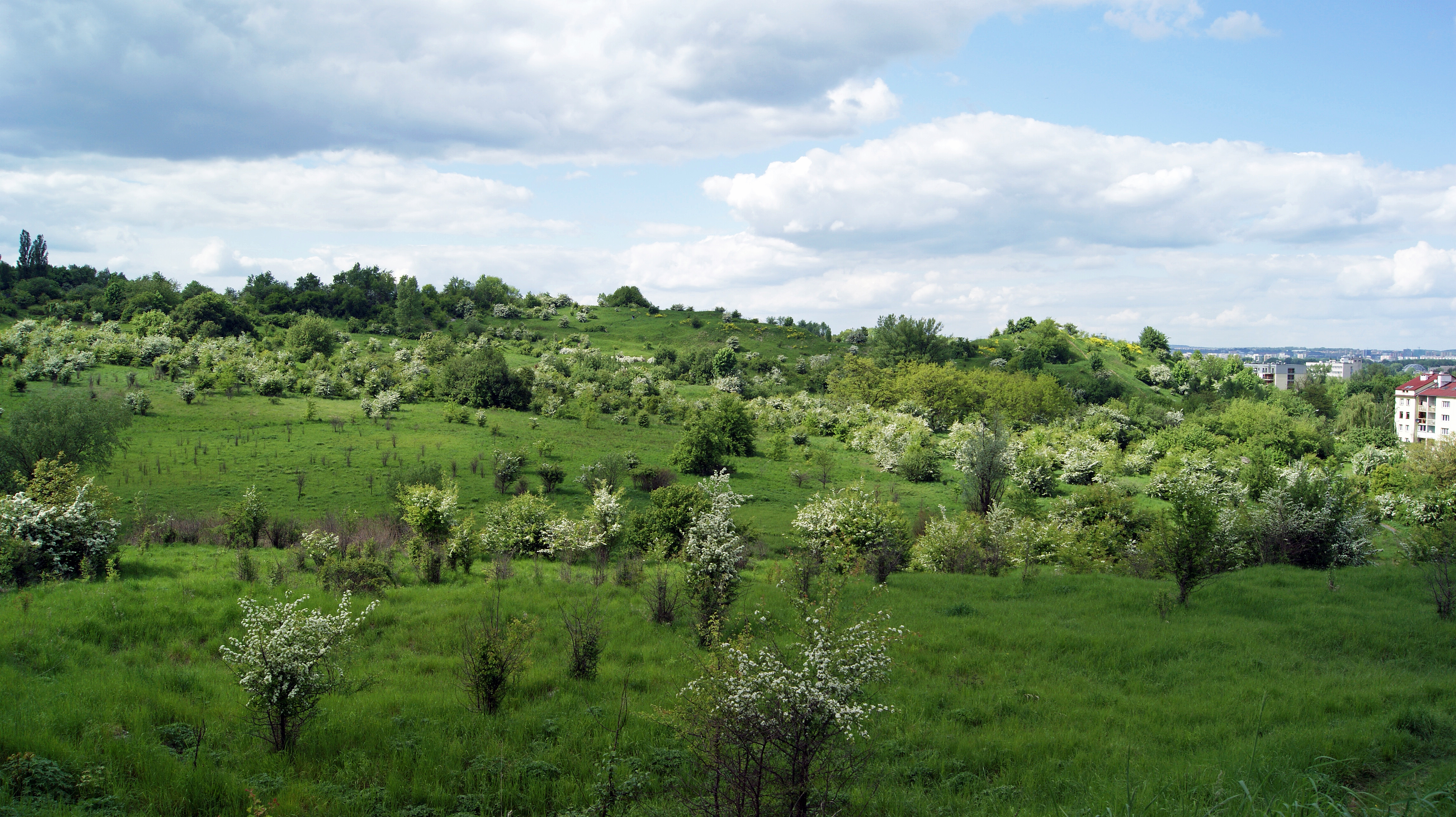
Podgorze's old and new Jewish cemeteries, 2011

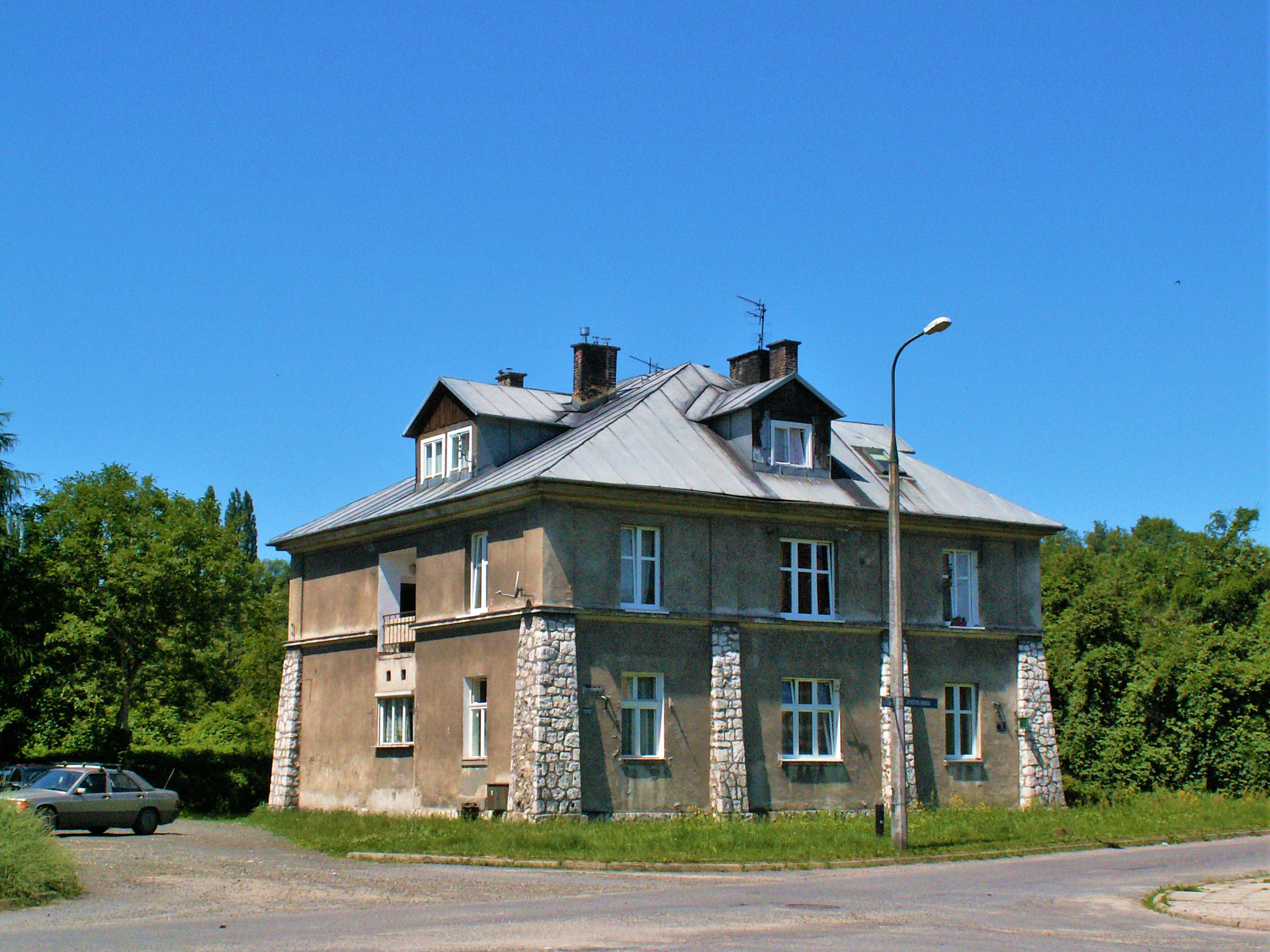
Grey House, 2010

== See also ==
- List of subcamps of Kraków-Płaszów
- PBS documentary Inheritance
- List of Nazi concentration camps

== Notes ==
- Crowe, David M. (2004). Oskar Schindler: The Untold Account of His Life, Wartime Activities, and the True Story Behind the List. Cambridge, MA: Westview Press. ISBN 978-0-465-00253-5.
