= Stanisław Ryszard Dobrowolski =

Polish poet (1907–1985)

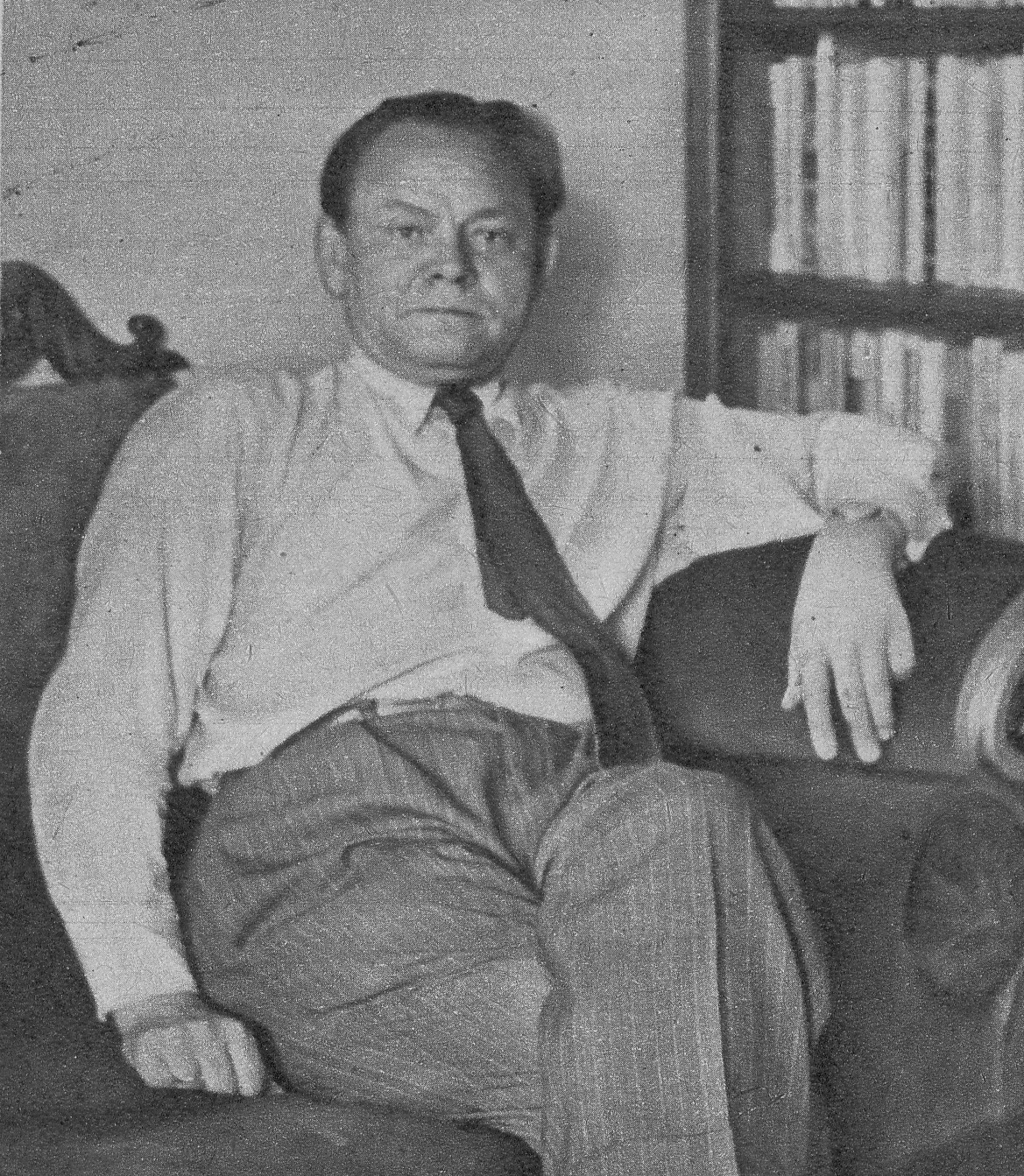
Stanisław Ryszard Dobrowolski (before 1972)

Stanisław Ryszard Dobrowolski (14 March 1907 in Warsaw–27 November 1985 in Warsaw) was a poet, prose writer and translator, a member of the left-wing avant-garde poetry group Kwadryga (Quadriga). Dobrowolski was a participant of the Warsaw Uprising. After the war he served as a political officer of the Polish People's Army.

== Sources ==
- Ю. Л. Булаховская. Станислав Рышард Добровольский: Жизнь и творчество / АН УССР, Ин-т лит. им. Т. Г. Шевченко, Киев. Наук. думка 1990 (Yu. L. Bulakhovskaya. Stanislav Ryshard Dobrovolsky: Life and work / Academy of Sciences of the Ukrainian SSR, Institute of Literature.. T. Shevchenko, Kiev. 1990)
