= Arnold Büscher =

Kraków concentration camp leader from 1944 to 1945 under Nazi Germany

- Born: 16 December 1899; Bad Oeynhausen, Germany
- Died: 2 August 1949 (aged 49); Polish People's Republic
- Military career
- Allegiance: Nazi Germany
- Branch: Schutzstaffel
- Service years: 1931–1945
- Rank: SS-Obersturmführer
- Commands: Arbeitslager KL-Płaszów

Arnold Büscher (16 December 1899 – 2 August 1949) was a German SS officer. Holding the rank of SS-Obersturmführer, he served as a commandant of the Kraków-Płaszów concentration camp, succeeding Amon Göth, from September 1944 until January 1945.

== Life ==
Büscher was born on 16 December 1899 in Bad Oeynhausen, Germany.

Büscher became a member of the Schutzstaffel (SS) in 1931. After the outbreak of the Second World War, he worked at many Nazi concentration camps, including Flossenbürg, Buchenwald, Sachsenhausen and Neuengamme.

Büscher succeeded Amon Göth as the commandant of the Płaszów concentration camp after the latter was arrested on 13 September 1944. During his tenure, the inmates did not experience any shootings or hangings. He improved the inmates' diets by allowing eggs, sugar and powdered milk. Büscher resisted Oskar Schindler's efforts to include 300 Jewish women on his list of Schindlerjuden for work at Schindler's new factory in Brněnec, instead sending them with other Jews from Płaszów to Auschwitz I. Furthermore, Büscher, perhaps out of spite for Schindler, requested of Auschwitz I commandant Richard Baer that 300 different Jewish women be sent to Schindler's factory. However, Schindler was able to bribe Baer to send him the original 300 female Schindlerjuden.

On 23 January 1948, Büscher was sentenced to death in Poland for crimes at Płaszów, despite his notably benign tenure contrasting with that of Amon Göth. He was executed by hanging on 2 August 1949.

Military offices
| Preceded by SS-Hauptsturmführer Amon Göth | Commandant of Kraków-Płaszów concentration camp September 1944 – c. January 1945 | Succeeded by None |
