= Hujowa Górka =

Place in Poland, related to Holocaust

Coordinates: 50°01′49″N 19°57′56″E

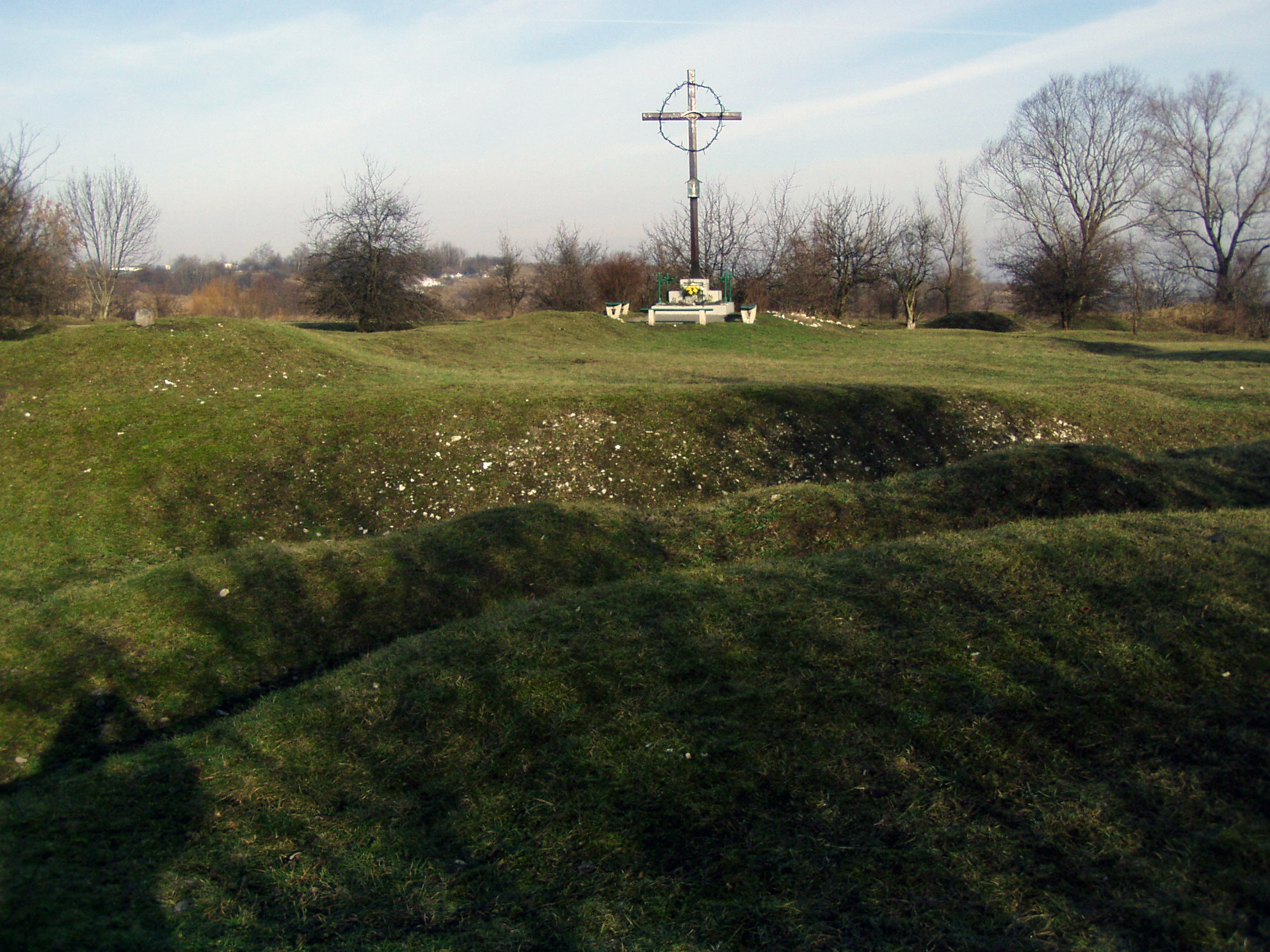
Hujowa Górka, 2008

Hujowa Górka ([xuˈjɔ.va ˈɡurka]; sometimes ”Hujarowa Górka” or Chujowa Górka, rarely ”Kozia Górka”) is a place near the site of Kraków-Płaszów concentration camp, where in April 1944 the Nazis exhumed and incinerated the bodies of around ten thousand previously killed Jews, to hide the evidence of the crime before retreating from the area. The place took its name from the surname of Unterscharführer Albert Hujar (also Huyar) who committed and directed the executions. It is also a mockery of Hujar's surname, which is pronounced similarly to a vulgar Polish language expression for "penis" (its English equivalent is "prick"), hence the name is Polish for "Prick Hill", because it could be seen from almost any part of the camp. Before World War II, an old Austrian fortification of the 19th century, dismantled in the 1930s, had been located on a hill. After destroying the fort, a large hexagonal pit remained here, with a circumference of up to 50 meters and a depth of up to 5 meters.

Starting from August-September 1943, ”Chujowa Gorka” had become the main place of mass executions of prisoners in Plaszow and was used until mid-February 1944, when it was filled with bodies. The prisoners were usually marched to a ditch surrounding Hujowa Gorka and told to lie down. An SS man, a Genickschußspezialist (specialist in shooting in the neck), would then administer a Nackenschuß, a shot in the nape of the neck. A dental technician, usually a Jew, would then pull the gold teeth out of each victim’s mouth. The dead bodies were then covered with a layer of dirt, though once Płaszow became a concentration camp the bodies were burned. The victims’ clothes were sent to the camp’s storehouses and most of the valuables were taken by the executioners. In 1944 the Germans leveled the site and even built some barracks above the mass grave. Immediately after the war, a large wooden cross with barbed wire was erected at the site to commemorate the Christian Poles who died in Płaszów.

Albert Hujar was the German officer who offered the place for the mass execution of Jews who arrived from the town of Bochnia (east of Krakow) in the summer of 1943. Albert Hujar, who served in the Schutzstaffel (SS) Concentration Camp service, is portrayed in the 1993 drama Schindler's List by Norbert Weisser.
