= Płaszów =

Suburb of Kraków, Poland

- Neighbourhood of Kraków
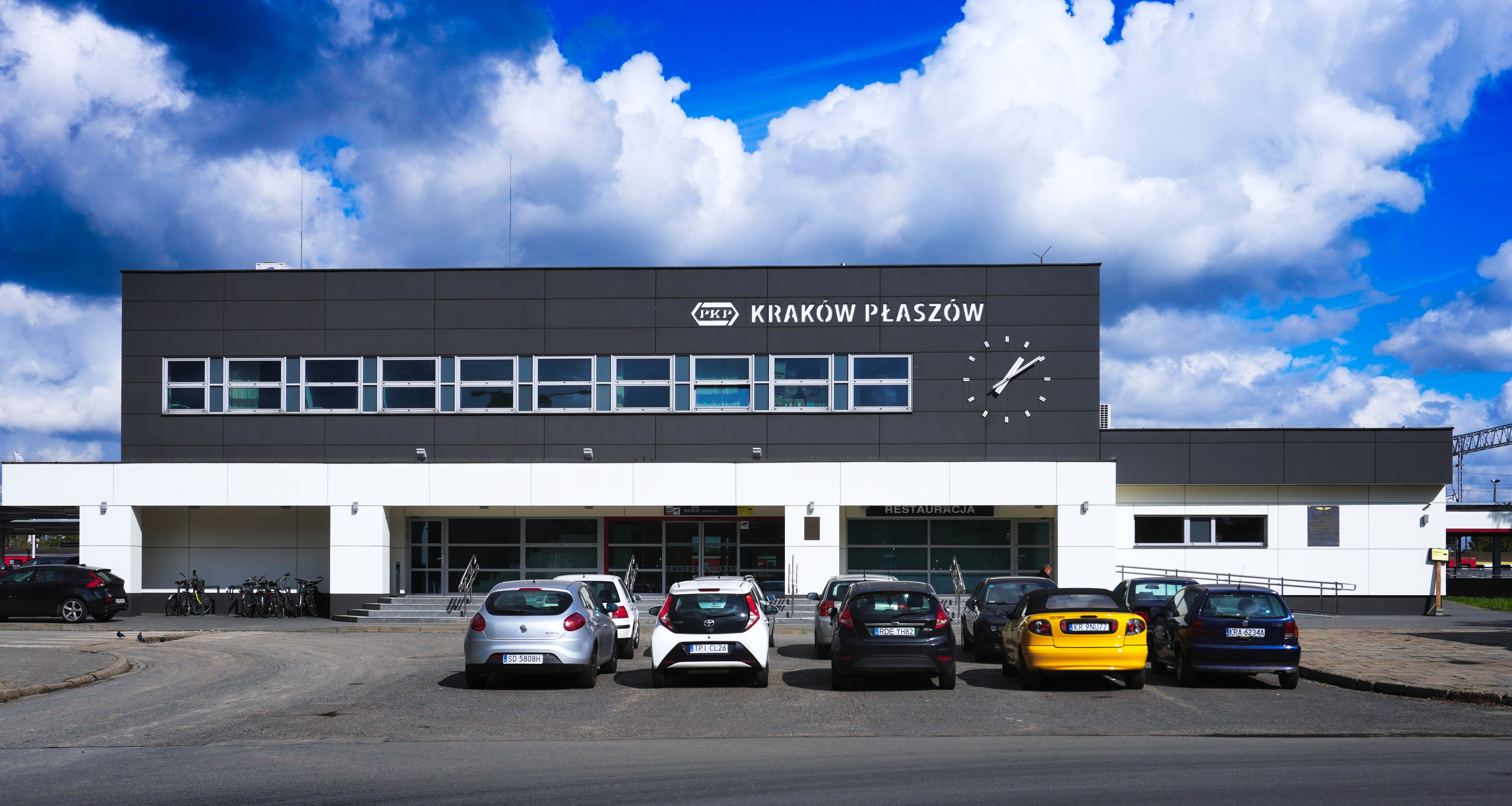
- Kraków-Płaszów train station along the PKP rail line 112
- Interactive map of Płaszów
- Country: Poland
- Voievodship: Lesser Poland
- City: Kraków
- District: Podgórze

Płaszów is a suburb of Kraków, Poland, now part of Podgórze district. Formerly a separate village, it became a part of the Greater Kraków in 1911 under the Austrian Partition of Poland as the 21st cadastral district of the city. During World War II, it was the location of the Kraków-Płaszów concentration camp for Jews deported from the Kraków Ghetto, as well as other prisoners from across occupied Poland.

== See also ==
- Auschwitz concentration camp
- Kraków-Płaszów concentration camp
