= Endowment Fund for the Memorial of the Shoah and Oskar Schindler =

The Endowment Fund for the Memorial of the Shoah and Oskar Schindler (Czech: Nadační fond Památník Šoa a Oskara Schindlera) is a charitable organization that promotes Holocaust awareness. It is currently engaged in turning the ruins of the factory used by Oskar Schindler to house the 1,200 Jews he saved with his list, made famous by the 1993 film Schindler's List, into a museum.

The fund was created in 2016 by Jaroslav Novak, a Czech writer, who has stated that the goal of the project "is to build a faithful replica on the original foundations, including concentration camp guard towers and factory space, hospital and camp prisoners." The memorial will also house space for exhibitions and conferences. The life of Oskar Schindler will be told through a trail around the complex.

In 2004, the village of Brněnec, home of the factory, attempted to build a memorial but was unable to raise the necessary funds.
