= Schindler's List (disambiguation) =

Schindler's List is a 1993 American historical drama film about the Holocaust directed by Steven Spielberg.

Schindler's List may also refer to:

- Schindler's List (soundtrack), score for the film by John Williams
- Schindlerjuden, a list of Jews were saved during the Holocaust by Oskar Schindler, basis of the film
- Schindler's Ark, US title Schindler's List, a 1982 fiction novel by Australian novelist Thomas Keneally
