= Helen Jonas-Rosenzweig =

Polish-American Holocaust survivor (1925–2018)

- Born: Helena Sternlicht; April 25, 1925; Kraków, Poland
- Died: December 20, 2018 (aged 93); Boca Raton, Florida, U.S.
- Citizenship: American
- Spouses: Joseph Jonas (m. 1946; died 1980) Henry Rosenzweig (m. 1990; died 2007)
- Children: 3

Helen Jonas-Rosenzweig (born Helena Sternlicht; April 25, 1925 – December 20, 2018) was a Polish-born Jewish Holocaust survivor who was interned during World War II at the Płaszów concentration camp where she was forced to work as a maid for SS camp commandant Amon Göth.

Born in Kraków, she survived the Holocaust with the help of Oskar Schindler, who was credited with saving the lives of nearly 1,200 Jewish forced laborers. After the war, Jonas-Rosenzweig emigrated to the United States. She resided in Boca Raton, Florida. Jonas-Rosenzweig met the daughter of Amon Göth, Monika Hertwig, and together they were featured in the 2006 documentary, Inheritance, made for PBS by James Moll.

== Early life ==
Helen Jonas-Rosenzweig was born Helena Sternlicht in Kraków, Second Polish Republic in 1925, to Szymon and Lola Sternlicht. She was the youngest daughter of an observant Jewish family. She remembered her early life as happy. She had two sisters, Bronisława and Sydonia. When Germany invaded Poland on September 1, 1939, she and her family were forced to relocate to the Kraków Ghetto.

== World War II ==
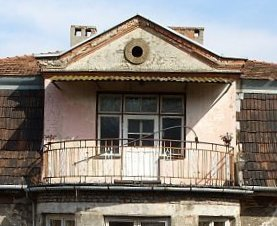
The balcony of Amon Göth's house in Płaszów, from which Helen Jonas-Rosenzweig said Göth would shoot at prisoners. Later, he used to step outside to hunt humans, with his Tyrolean hat marking his intentions. It was the signal for seasoned prisoners to attempt to hide.

=== Płaszów Concentration Camp ===
In 1942, Sternlicht and her family were deported from the Kraków Ghetto and sent to concentration camps. Her father died at the Bełżec extermination camp. She, her mother, and two sisters were sent to Kraków-Płaszów, an arbeitslager (forced labor camp).

On the third day of her internment at Płaszów, Sternlicht was washing windows in a barracks when Göth, the camp commandant, entered the room. He commented on the job she was doing and ordered her to go to his villa on the grounds of the camp to work as a housemaid.

She moved from the barracks to Göth's residence, where she was forced to work as a maid. She shared a room in the basement with another woman, Helen Hirsch (portrayed in the novel Schindler's Ark and its film adaptation Schindler's List), who was also forced to work for Göth. The two women shared the household duties at the commandant's home for the next two years, where they lived in constant fear for their lives.

While working for Göth, Sternlicht saw his notorious sadism firsthand. She said that he would shoot prisoners from the balcony of his villa, and she saw him murder several people and order the deaths of many more. He also beat her. She said that while Göth as depicted in Schindler's List appeared to be interested romantically in his maid, he was not attracted to her in real life.

She later recalled that shortly after she moved to Göth's home, she saw him suddenly, and without provocation, shoot dead a young Jewish man who worked for him as a valet. During this period Sternlicht had a boyfriend at the camp, Adam Sztab, who was part of a resistance group inside the camp. She stole some papers from Göth that she gave to Sztab. Göth was told of Sztab's activities by a guard. Göth shot Sztab to death within earshot of Sternlicht, and she was certain that he would kill her too, but he never mentioned it to her. Göth had Sztab's body hung publicly for other prisoners to see, along with a warning about trying to escape.

=== Oskar Schindler ===
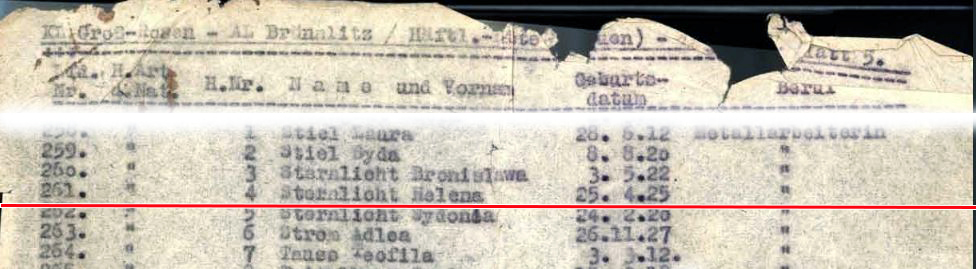
Helena Sternlicht and her two sisters' names on Schindler's famous list

Oskar Schindler was a frequent guest at Göth's home and he often had encouraging words for Sternlicht, who recalled his saying to her, "Remember the people in Egypt? They were freed. So you will be, too." After Göth's arrest for embezzling Jewish property from the German government, she later recalled, "Like magic, all of a sudden the doorbell rings – Schindler is standing there in his coat and saying, 'You're coming with me'". Schindler, who saved about 1,200 Jews from Auschwitz by claiming he needed them to work in his factory, added Sternlicht and her sisters, Bronisława and Sydonia, to his list of workers who later became known as the Schindlerjuden. By that time, their mother had died from pneumonia due to the poor conditions at the camp.

As the Red Army approached Kraków in late 1944, Płaszów was closed, and the inmates were sent to camps around Poland, including death camps like Auschwitz. Schindler made plans to open a munitions factory in Brněnec, Czech Protectorate, using the workers he had in Kraków. The men on Schindler's list travelled safely by train to Brněnec, but Schindler's 300 female workers, including Sternlicht and her sisters, were sent to Auschwitz. After a few weeks of negotiations and bribes by Schindler, the women were sent to Brněnec as well. Sternlicht and her sisters spent the remainder of the war in the relative safety of Schindler's camp until they were liberated by the Red Army in May 1945.

After the war, Sternlicht testified against Amon Göth at his trial in Kraków, where he was sentenced to death and executed. She met Joseph Jonas two days after liberation, married him and emigrated with her family to the United States in 1946.

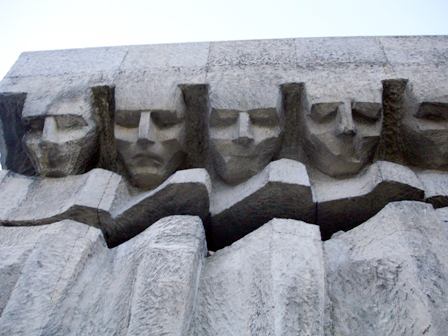
Płaszów Memorial, where Helen Jonas-Rosenzweig and Monika Hertwig met for the first time.

== Inheritance ==
In 2004, Jonas-Rosenzweig met with Monika Hertwig, Amon Göth's daughter. Hertwig had requested the meeting, but Jonas-Rosenzweig was hesitant because her memories of Göth and the concentration camp were so traumatic. She eventually agreed after Hertwig wrote to her, "We have to do it for the murdered people."

Jonas-Rosenzweig felt touched by this sentiment and agreed to meet her at the Płaszów Memorial Monument in Poland and tour Göth's villa with her for the 2006 documentary Inheritance. The documentary's director, James Moll, an associate of Steven Spielberg, helped bring the two women together to make the film for PBS.

== Personal life ==
Two days after they were liberated from the Nazis, she met her first husband, Joseph Jonas. They married in 1946 and emigrated to the United States. They lived in the Bronx, raising three children: a son and twin girls.

In 1980, Joseph, who suffered from survivor's guilt, died by suicide. She married a philanthropist and real-estate developer, Henry Rosenzweig (born 5 September 1917) in 1990. She was widowed a second time in 2007. She resided in Boca Raton, Florida until her death in December 2018.
