= František Bartoš =

František Bartoš may refer to:

- František Bartoš (composer) (1905–1973), Czech composer, music critic, and musicologist
- František Bartoš (folklorist) (1837–1906), Moravian folksong collector and dialectologist
- František Bartoš (motorcyclist) (1926–1987), Czech Grand Prix motorcycle road racer
