= Moshe Taube =

Polish/American/Israeli hazzan

- Born: Maximillian Taube; 17 June 1927; Kraków, Poland
- Died: 11 November 2020 (aged 93)
- Occupations: cantor and academic
- Known for: Holocaust survivor

Moshe Taube (17 June 1927 – 11 November 2020) was a cantor, academic, and musician. He was a popular concert performer in Israel in the 1950s and later became a successful recording artist in the United States. Taube was among the over 1,200 Holocaust survivors saved by Oskar Schindler.

== Biography ==
Moshe Taube was born in Kraków, Poland, in 1927. He began singing and studying music by age 8 in a choir led by his mentor, the prominent cantor Yossele Mandelbaum.

In 1939, he and his family were taken by the Nazis in the Kraków Ghetto during the Holocaust. In 1942, he and his father were assigned to the Kraków-Płaszów concentration camp, while his mother and sister were murdered, along with dozens of his extended family members. He and his father were saved in 1945 by the actions of Oskar Schindler, whose story is memorialized in the 1993 film Schindler's List.

After being rescued, Taube first lived with a relative in Romania, then a short time later he and his father immigrated to British-ruled Palestine, which became Israel in 1948. Taube immigrated to the U.S. in 1957 and continued his music education at the Juilliard School in New York City. He taught young cantors at the Jewish Theological Seminary of America. In 1965, he became cantor at Congregation Beth Shalom in Pittsburgh, where he served for more than 40 years. From 1971 to 1988, he was an adjunct professor of music at Duquesne University.
