= Mimi Reinhardt =

Austrian secretary (1915–2022)

- Born: Carmen Koppel; 15 January 1915; Wiener Neustadt, Cisleithania, Austria-Hungary (modern-day Austria)
- Died: 8 April 2022 (aged 107); Herzliya, Israel
- Education: University of Vienna
- Occupation: Secretary
- Known for: Author of Schindler's list
- Children: 2

The list type-written by Mimi Reinhardt. She is number 279, Carmen Weitmann.

Mimi Reinhardt (born Carmen Koppel; known as Carmen Weitmann c. 1936 – c. 1950; 15 January 1915 – 8 April 2022) was an Austrian Jewish secretary. She worked for Oskar Schindler and typed his list of Jewish workers to recruit for his factory.

== Early years ==
Carmen Koppel was born to Emil and Frieda Koppel in Wiener Neustadt, Austria-Hungary. She learned shorthand to take notes better during her language studies at the University of Vienna. In Vienna, Austria, she met her future husband, whom she followed from Austria to Kraków, Poland, in 1936. Their son, Sascha Weitmann, was born there in June 1939.

== Oskar Schindler ==
Carmen Weitmann and her husband managed to evacuate their son and her grandmother to Hungary during the Nazi occupation of Poland. She and her husband were arrested; he was shot at the gate of the Kraków ghetto while trying to escape. At the time, she was 30 years old. After the liquidation of the ghetto, she was transported with other Jews to the Plaszow camp. As she knew shorthand, she was employed in the camp administration, where she met Oskar Schindler. She knew he treated his Jewish workers well and became Schindler's secretary. After Schindler had asked the SS camp commander Amon Göth for more workers, she began to type out the list of workers from the ghetto of the Polish city of Krakow so that they could then be transferred to the Brünnlitz subcamp, where Oskar Schindler continued his armaments business.

The train that was supposed to take the Jewish workers on the list from Plaszow to Brünnlitz in the fall of 1944 was diverted to Auschwitz. Mimi and the other "Schindlerjuden" were there for about two weeks and they described this time as "straight out of Dante's Inferno". At the time, Schindler was trying to get "his" Jews from Auschwitz to Brünnlitz. Due to his help, 1,200 Jews survived there until the liberation in May 1945.

== Later years and death ==
After the war, Weitmann found her son in Hungary and moved with him to Tangier International Zone, Morocco. There she met and married her second husband, a hotel manager surnamed Reinhardt. In 1957, the family moved to the United States and lived in New York. She had a second child, a daughter, with her second husband, but her daughter died of an illness at the age of 49. In 2007, at age 92, Reinhardt moved to Herzliya, Israel, to live with her son, Sacha Weitman, who was then a professor of sociology at Tel Aviv University. She died there in 2022, at age 107, in a retirement home.
