= Itzhak Stern =

Polish accountant and Holocaust survivor (1901–1969)

- יצחק שטרן
- Born: 25 January 1901; Kraków, Austria-Hungary
- Died: 30 January 1969 (aged 68); Tel Aviv, Israel
- Occupation: Accountant
- Known for: Accountant of Oskar Schindler who assisted him in his wartime rescue activities.
- Spouse: Sophia Backenrot (m. 1945)

Itzhak Stern (Hebrew: יצחק שטרן; 25 January 1901 – 30 January 1969) was a Polish Jew and a Holocaust survivor, who worked for Sudeten-German industrialist Oskar Schindler and assisted him in his rescue activities during the Holocaust. After World War II, Stern moved to Israel.

== Life ==
=== Early life ===
Stern was born 25 January 1901, in Kraków, then part of Grand Duchy of Kraków, Austria-Hungary (present-day Poland). He was an important leader in the Jewish community, and was the vice president of the Jewish Agency for Western Poland and a member of the Zionist Central Committee. In 1938, he was engaged to Sophia Backenrot, although the marriage was postponed until after the war.

=== World War II ===
On the 18 of November 1939, during the early months of the Nazi occupation of Poland, Oskar Schindler was introduced to Stern, who was then working as an accountant for Schindler's fellow Abwehr agent Josef "Sepp" Aue, who had gained control of Stern's formerly Jewish-owned place of employment as a Treuhänder (trustee). Schindler showed Stern the balance sheet of a company he was thinking of acquiring, an enamelware manufacturer called Rekord Ltd owned by a consortium of Jewish businessmen (including Abraham Bankier) that had filed for bankruptcy earlier that year. Stern advised him that rather than running the company as a trusteeship under the auspices of the Haupttreuhandstelle Ost (Main Trustee Office for the East), he should buy or lease the business directly, as that would give him more freedom from the dictates of the Nazis, including the freedom to hire more Jews. Despite Stern being Jewish and Schindler being a member of the Nazi Party, Schindler was friendly to Stern. Later, Stern said of the meeting:

I did not know what he wanted and I was frightened... [until] 1 December, we Polish Jews had been left more or less alone. They had Aryanized the factories, of course. And if a German asked you a question in the street it was compulsory for you to precede your answer with 'I am a Jew....' But it was only on December 1st that we had to begin wearing the Star of David. It was just as the situation had begun to grow worse for the Jews, when the Sword of Damocles was already over our heads, that I had this meeting with Oskar Schindler.

In a later meeting, Stern informed Schindler that he could use Jewish slave labour to staff his factory, Deutsche Emaillewarenfabrik (German Enamelware Factory) at a lower price than Polish laborers, which would also allow those laborers to be protected from deportations. Schindler followed his suggestion, which began his rescue activities of Jews during the Holocaust.

Kraków's Jews were imprisoned in the Kraków Ghetto six months after German troops invaded Kraków. The ghetto was fully liquidated in 1943. Those considered useful (to be used as slave labour) were sent to Płaszów, including Schindler's workers and Stern. The rest were sent to various death camps across Poland. In Płaszów, Stern and his brother Natan, along with Mietek Pemper and Joseph Bau, were forced to work in Płaszów's office, where they came into frequent contact with the camp's notorious commandant, Amon Göth. Stern helped Pemper in his efforts to prevent the closure and liquidation of Płaszów, knowing that while conditions there were terrible, liquidation likely meant the deaths of every prisoner. Stern kept in contact with Schindler throughout this time and worked to better conditions for the Jews, including transferring workers to Schindler's factory, distributing aid money, and attempting to inform the outside world of their plight.

In 1944, when the closure of Płaszów became inevitable, Schindler decided to open a new factory, the Brünnlitz labor camp, in Brněnec, occupied Czechoslovakia, for his Jewish workers in order to prevent them from being sent to death camps. Stern and the surviving members of his family were placed on the famous list to be transferred to Brünnlitz by Schindler, although Stern's mother died of illness when she, along with the other female Schindlerjuden, was transferred to Auschwitz before Schindler could arrange their transfer to Brünnlitz. The male Schindlerjuden, including Stern and Natan, were transported to Gross-Rosen before they were sent to the relative safety of Brünnlitz, where Stern worked directly with Schindler and became one of the leaders of the Jewish workers. Due to his membership in the Nazi Party and service in the Abwehr, Schindler was in danger of being arrested after the defeat of Nazi Germany. Stern and the other Jewish leaders wrote a letter attesting to Schindler's rescue of Jews, which they gave to Schindler before he fled to the Allied lines.

=== Later life ===
After the liberation of the Brünnlitz camp by the Red Army, Stern moved to Paris and eventually emigrated to Israel. He advocated for Schindler to be recognized more broadly, even writing a pamphlet about his rescue activity. Stern remained friends with Schindler for the rest of his life, corresponding with him until his death in 1969. It was reported that Schindler "cried inconsolably" at his funeral.

== Personal life ==
In 1938, Stern was engaged to Sophia Backenrot, who survived the war due to her Aryan appearance in the Drohobycz ghetto. Their marriage was postponed until the end of the war in 1945. They remained married until Stern's death at the age of 68.

== Legacy ==
He was portrayed in the 1993 film Schindler's List by English actor Ben Kingsley. At the end of the film, Stern's widow Sophia appears in a procession of Schindlerjuden and the actors who portrayed them, placing stones on Schindler's grave on Mount Zion, which is a Jewish tradition showing respect for the deceased. Stern's brother Natan was also one of the Schindlerjuden in the procession.
