= Poldek Pfefferberg =

Holocaust survivor (1913-2001)

- Born: Leopold Pfefferberg; March 20, 1913; Kraków, Austria-Hungary
- Died: March 9, 2001 (aged 87); Beverly Hills, California, U.S.
- Resting place: Hillside Memorial Park Cemetery
- Other name: Leopold Page
- Education: Jagiellonian University, Kraków
- Occupations: Teacher; Army officer; shopkeeper
- Known for: Surviving the Holocaust, motivating creation and production of Schindler's List
- Spouse: Ludmila Lewison (m. 1941)
- Children: 2

Leopold "Poldek" Pfefferberg (March 20, 1913 – March 9, 2001), also known as Leopold Page, was a Polish-American Holocaust survivor who inspired the Australian writer Thomas Keneally to write the Booker Prize-winning novel Schindler's Ark, which in turn was the basis for Steven Spielberg's critically acclaimed 1993 film Schindler's List.

== Life ==
=== Early life ===
Pfefferberg was born into a Jewish family in Kraków, then a part of Austria-Hungary. He gained a master's degree in philosophy and physical education from the Jagiellonian University. Pfefferberg was a high-school teacher in Kraków until 1939 and the physical education professor at Kościuszko Gymnasium in Podgórze.

=== The Holocaust ===
After the Germans invaded Poland in 1939, he joined the Polish Army as an officer and took part in the defence of Poland against the invasion. He later explained to the Australian novelist Thomas Keneally how he was wounded on the San River where his life was saved by his sergeant major, who carried him to a field hospital. After Poland was defeated and partitioned between Nazi Germany and the Soviet Union, Pfefferberg needed to decide whether it would be safer to travel east towards the Soviets or west towards the Germans. He later recalled this choice:

We officers had to decide to go east or west. I decided not to go east, even though I was Jewish. If I had, I would have been shot with all the other poor sons of bitches in Katyn Forest.

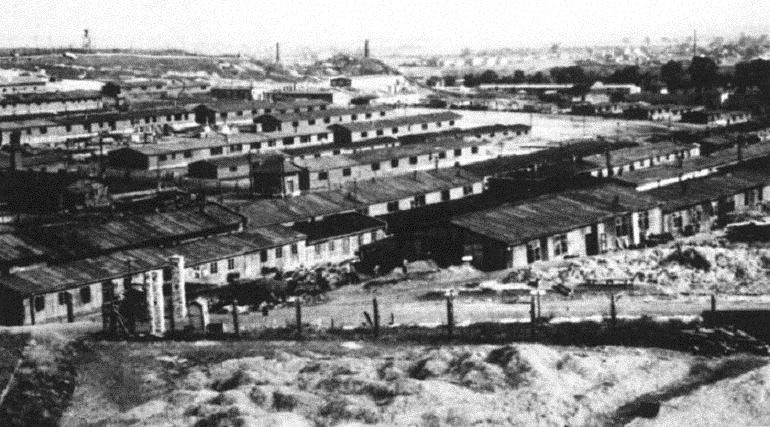
Kraków-Płaszów concentration camp

After sneaking back to Kraków, he was imprisoned along with the rest of the area's Jews, in the Kraków Ghetto. Pfefferberg used a German-issued document to visit his soldiers in a military hospital, and also to visit his mother. This is how he first met Oskar Schindler, a Sudeten-German businessman who was taking over an enamelware factory that had been confiscated from Jews. Schindler employed Pfefferberg's mother, an interior designer, to decorate his new apartment. He later began helping Schindler trade on Kraków's wartime black market.

In 1941, he married Ludmila "Mila" Lewison, with whom he later had two children. Mila, like Pfefferberg, would become a survivor of the Kraków-Płaszów concentration camp and a Schindlerjude.

Through this connection to Schindler, Pfefferberg was employed in Schindler's factory near the Kraków-Płaszów concentration camp outside Kraków. This enabled him to survive the extermination of 3 million Polish Jews, during which his parents, sister, brother-in-law and many other relatives were murdered. Pfefferberg described Schindler as "a modern Noah," who was able to save a number of Kraków Jews from deportation to the nearby extermination camp at Auschwitz. Those he saved became known as Schindlerjuden or "Schindler's Jews".

He and his wife were moved with Schindler and many others to a camp at Brünnlitz due to their presence on the famous "Schindler's list". During that time, he acquired skills as a welder. The Jews at Brünnlitz were liberated on May 9, 1945, by the Red Army.

=== Life after World War II ===
After the war, the Pfefferbergs first settled in Budapest, then in Munich where he organized a school for refugee children. In 1948, he emigrated to the United States, where he intermittently went by the name Leopold Page. He and his wife settled in Los Angeles in 1950, eventually opening a leather goods business in Beverly Hills. In the United States he used the name Leopold Page, although in later years he apparently reverted to Pfefferberg. He tried on a number of occasions to interest the screenwriters and film-makers he met through his business in a film based on the story of Schindler and his actions in saving Polish Jews from the Nazis, arranging several interviews with Schindler for American television. Schindler's death in 1974 seemed to end any possibility of a film.

In 1980, when Thomas Keneally went into Pfefferberg's shop to ask about the price of briefcases, Pfefferberg learned that Keneally was a novelist and showed him his extensive files on Schindler. Keneally was interested, and Pfefferberg became an advisor for the book, accompanying Keneally to Poland where they visited Kraków and the sites associated with the Schindler story. Keneally dedicated Schindler's Ark to Pfefferberg: "who by zeal and persistence caused this book to be written."

Pfefferberg explained the reasons behind his efforts to have the Schindler story told as:

Schindler gave me my life, and I tried to give him immortality.

After the publication of Schindler's Ark in 1982, Pfefferberg worked to persuade Steven Spielberg to film Keneally's book, using his acquaintance with Spielberg's mother to gain access. Pfefferberg claimed to have called Spielberg's office every week for 11 years. When in 1992 Spielberg agreed to make the film, Pfefferberg worked as an advisor, again making the trip to Poland to show Spielberg the sites; he appears in the film's epilogue and is listed in the end credits as a consultant, under the name Leopold Page. His character appears in the movie, depicted by actor Jonathan Sagall. Pfefferberg and his wife were Spielberg's guests on the night Schindler's List won seven Academy Awards. In his acceptance speech for best director that night, Spielberg thanked "a survivor named Poldek Pfefferberg ... I owe him such a debt. He has carried the story of Oskar Schindler to all of us."

Pfefferberg was a founder of the Oskar Schindler Humanities Foundation, which recognises acts by individuals and organizations, regardless of race or nationality. He remarked on the Foundation:

Only when the foundation is a reality will I say I have fulfilled my obligation. Because when I am no longer here, when the Schindler Jews are not here, the foundation will still go on.

Pfefferberg died on March 9, 2001, aged 87, in Beverly Hills.

== See also ==
- Polish contribution to World War II
- Sikorski–Mayski agreement
- United States Holocaust Memorial Museum
