= Laura Hillman =

Holocaust survivor (1923–2020)

- Born: Hannelore Wolff; October 16, 1923; Aurich, East Frisia, Hanover, Prussia, Germany
- Died: June 4, 2020 (aged 96); Rossmoor, California, United States
- Citizenship: American
- Notable work: i will plant you a lilac tree – a memoir of a Schindler's list survivor
- Spouse: Bernhard "Dick" Hillman (m. 1945; died 1986)
- Children: Robert Steven Hillman

Laura Hillman (born Hannelore Wolff; October 16, 1923 – June 4, 2020) was a German-born American survivor of Holocaust concentration camps, including Auschwitz-Birkenau. She was also a Schindlerjude, who survived the Holocaust with the help of Oskar Schindler. She was also a writer and memoirist, as well as a lecturer on the Holocaust, and a docent at the Long Beach Museum of Art. In 2005, she published i will plant you a lilac tree – a memoir of a Schindler's list survivor, a young adult book about her experiences during the Holocaust.

== Life ==
Laura Hillman was born Hannelore Wolff in Aurich, Ostfriesland, Germany to a large Jewish family on October 16, 1923. As a teenager, she attended a Jewish boarding school outside Berlin. When she heard that her mother and brothers had received deportation orders, she requested that Nazi authorities allow her to go with them, knowing that she would receive one in the future. Her request was granted, but she was still separated from her family shortly after being deported to Poland. 63 members of Wolff's family were murdered during the Holocaust, including her parents, Martin and Karoline Wolff, and her brothers, Wolfgang and Selly Wolff. Selly Wolff died after being beaten in the Budzyń concentration camp, a subcamp of Majdanek. Her two sisters, Rosel and Hildegard, survived the war, because they were living outside continental Europe, one in England and the other in the Palestine Mandate.

Wolff was imprisoned in more than seven different labor and concentration camps during the Holocaust. Wolff and a Polish Jewish prisoner of war named Bernhard "Dick" Hillman (born December 24, 1915), whose entire family was killed during the war, met at the fourth camp where Wolff had been sent, Budzyń. They were then sent to Płaszów concentration camp, where they both managed to get on the famous "Schindler's list", a list of Jewish workers who were spared from being sent to death camps after the closure of Płaszów. Wolff, along with the other female Schindlerjuden were sent to Auschwitz-Birkenau, where they spent a harrowing few weeks before Schindler managed to bribe Nazi officials into sending them to the relative safety of his camp, Brünnlitz, where Wolff and Hillman spent the rest of the war. They were liberated by the Red Army on May 9, 1945.

The couple was married by a Jewish army chaplain in Erding, Bavaria on October 22, 1945. The couple emigrated to the United States, arriving in New York City on January 4, 1947, and ultimately settling in Los Alamitos, California, where Hannelore Hillman changed her first name to "Laura". They had one son in 1954.

Hillman was widowed in 1986 after her husband died of heart disease. In 2005, she published her memoir about her experiences during the Holocaust which is titled i will plant you a lilac tree – a memoir of a Schindler's list survivor. The title came from a promise which her husband made to her during their time in the concentration camps, to plant her lilac trees like the ones which existed in her childhood home in Aurich.

Laura Hillman died on June 4, 2020, in Rossmoor, California, aged 96.

== Writings ==
- I will plant you a lilac tree, a memoir of a Schindler's list survivor. Atheneum Books for Young Readers: NY, London, Toronto & Sydney: 2005. ISBN 0-689-86980-0
