= Brünnlitz labor camp =

Nazi forced labor camp

Brünnlitz
- Nazi concentration camp
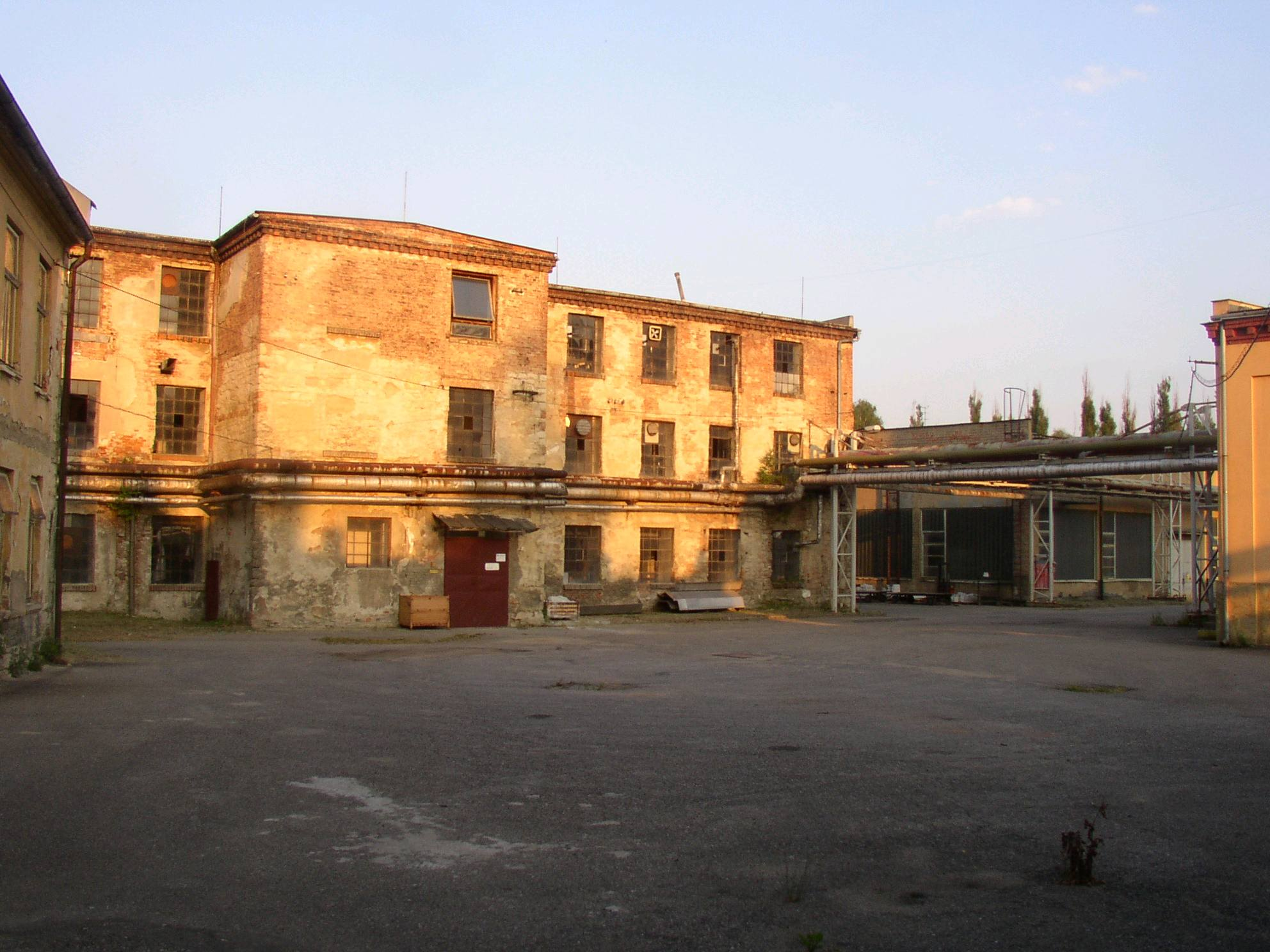
- The remains of the main factory at Brünnlitz in 2004
- Other names: Arbeitslager Brünnlitz
- Known for: Schindler's List
- Location: Brněnec, Sudetengau
- Operated by: Nazi Germany and the Schutzstaffel
- Commandant: Josef Leipold; (Oct 1944 – Jan 1945)
- Original use: Armaments factory
- Operational: October 1944 – May 1945
- Inmates: Jews (Schindlerjuden)
- Number of inmates: 1,200
- Killed: none
- Liberated by: Red Army, 9 May 1945
- Notable inmates: Abraham Bankier, Joseph Bau, Moshe Bejski, Laura Hillman, Ryszard Horowitz, Helen Jonas-Rosenzweig, Leon Leyson, Mietek Pemper, Poldek Pfefferberg, Leo Rosner, Itzhak Stern

The Brünnlitz labor camp (Arbeitslager Brünnlitz) was a German forced labor camp which was established in 1944 just outside the town of Brněnec (Brünnlitz in German), Sudetengau (part of occupied Czechoslovakia). It operated solely as a site for an armaments factory run by the German industrialist Oskar Schindler, which was in actuality a front for a safe haven for Schindlerjuden. Administratively, it was a sub-camp of the Gross-Rosen concentration camp system.

As of 2025, part of the factory site has been converted into a museum.

== Command and control ==
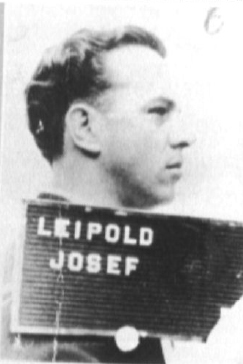
SS-Ostuf Josef Leipold

The Brünnlitz labor camp was administratively a sub-camp of the Gross-Rosen concentration camp system. The camp was assigned an SS garrison consisting of about one hundred SS guards and female staff. The commander of the camp was SS-Obersturmführer Josef Leipold. From the very beginning, Schindler told the SS his factory would not operate as a typical camp, forbade guards to punish or harass the camp inmates, and barred any SS member from entering the operational part of the factory.

== History ==
The factory in Brünnlitz was established in the 1850s by the Löw-Beer family to produce high-quality textiles. The original factory was settled in the building of a former paper-making factory and was subsequently expanded into several newly constructed buildings. Under the terms of the 1938 Munich Agreement, the town was in the territory ceded to Nazi Germany; the Löw-Beer family fled to Britain, except for Alfred Löw-Beer who tried to oversee the family property. Alfred was arrested in March 1939 and murdered one month later. The factory was seized and taken over by the German textile company Brüder Hoffmann. After the wartime shortage caused a dampening of textile production, portions of the factory buildings were leased in 1944 to companies involved in armaments manufacturing.

Prior to the fall of 1944, Oskar Schindler had owned an enamelware factory in Kraków and employed over 1,000 Jewish prisoners. When he learned that the nearby Kraków-Płaszów concentration camp was to be shut down and all its inmates (including his workers) sent to Auschwitz-Birkenau for extermination, he decided to set up the Brünnlitz labor camp. A large segment of Schindler's labor force consisted of unskilled workers or people who were too sick or weak to work, whom he had been protecting under the guise of essential labor, and he knew they would be killed soon after reaching Auschwitz. Using much of the money he had earned from his enamelware business, Schindler bribed SS and Nazi officials in order to gain permission to move his labor force to the Sudetengau and set up a munitions factory. In addition, he had to pay the costs of converting the disused Löw-Beer textile mill to munitions production, equipping it as a camp, and shipping his supplies and machinery there.

The "concentration camp" at Brünnlitz was simply a factory complex, with an attached barracks for the workers and no real external security to speak of. A token front gate and a perimeter fence were the only measures put in place to prevent escapes; however, every Jew at the complex was grateful to be there and hoped to survive the war under Schindler's protection. The SS guards at the camp were left with little to do, and Schindler bribed them with good food and alcohol to leave his workers alone.

Between November 1944 and January 1945, the Brünnlitz labor camp was visited several times by former Płaszów commandant Amon Göth, who considered himself a friend to Schindler. The inmates at Brünnlitz, many of whom had suffered harshly under Göth, remarked that he was a physically changed man and looked feeble and pathetic compared to his early tenure when he was a figure who commanded absolute fear and terror.

Schindler went bankrupt keeping his factory running, having spent his remaining money on food and supplies, bribes to the SS, and purchases of artillery shells from other factories that he passed off as having been made at Brünnlitz. The factory produced no usable armaments of its own, a strategy deliberately chosen by Schindler in the hope of hastening the war's end by contributing nothing to German military efforts. The Red Army liberated Brünnlitz on May 9, 1945. A few days prior, the SS guards had deserted and Schindler had escaped to American lines with the help of his Jewish workers, carrying a letter written by them that attested to his rescue activities.

A total of 42 Jews died at Brünnlitz during its time of operation and were buried in a mass grave behind a cemetery in Bělá nad Svitavou shortly before the end of the war. This total includes 12 Jews who had been part of a trainload shipped to the camp from the Polish village of Goleszów, and who had frozen to death during the journey.

== Commemoration ==
In 1946 the Jewish victims were exhumed and buried in the cemetery under a small memorial. In 1995 the grave was renewed and a memorial plaque dedicated to the Jewish victims of the Second World War was attached to the cemetery wall.

As of October 2016, Jaroslav Novak and the Endowment Fund for the Memorial of the Shoah and Oskar Schindler has purchased the site where the camp was located and plans to convert it into a museum.

In November 2016, the set of buildings of a former textile factory was proclaimed a protected memorial site.

== Timeline ==
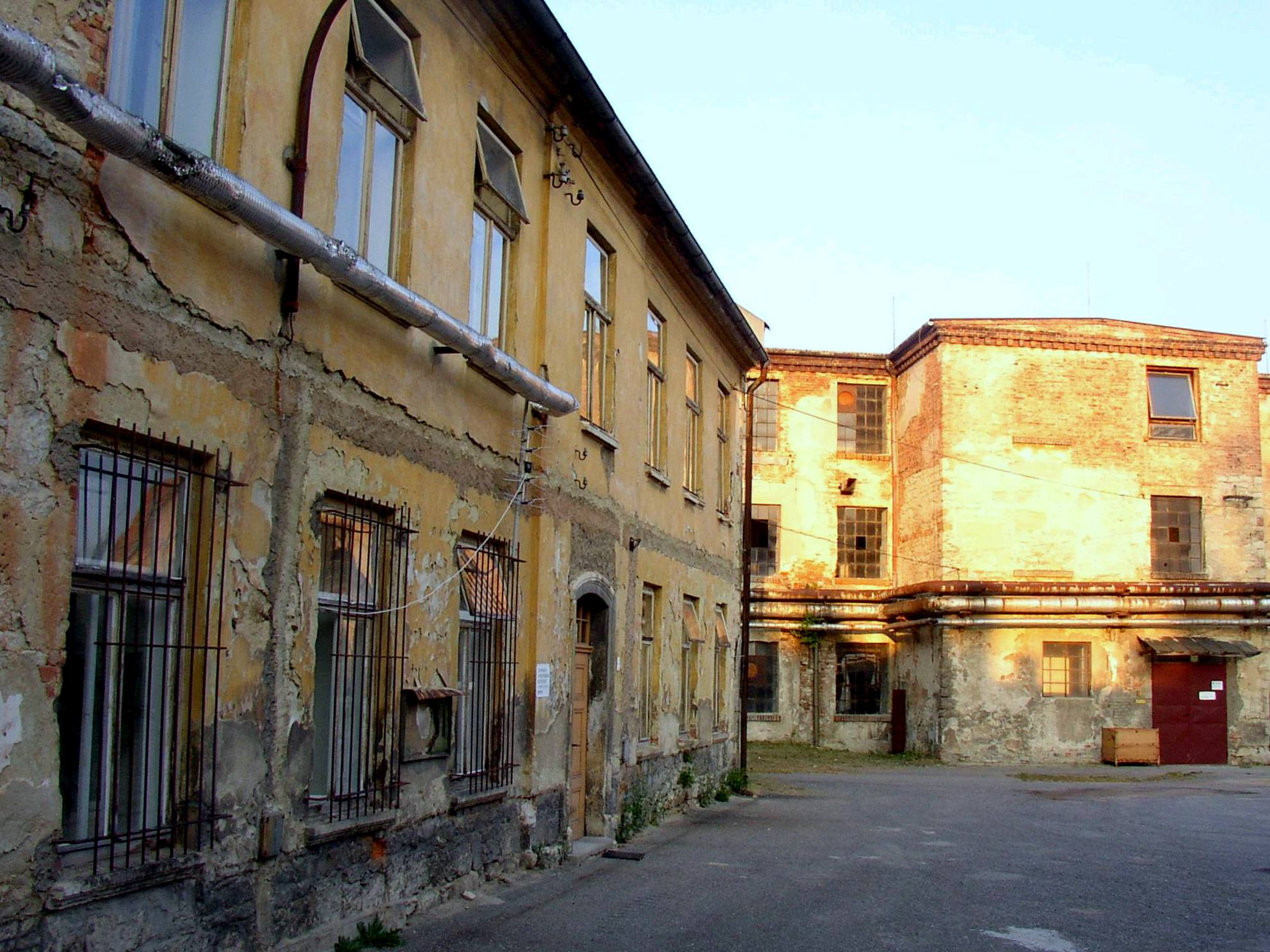
The ruins of the factory in 2004.

- 1840s: The Löw-Beer Jewish family moved into the area. They set up the factory, making high-quality textiles.
- 1938: The Germans occupied Czechoslovakia. The Löw-Beer family fled to Britain. Germans took over the factory.
- 1944: Oskar Schindler brought his Jews to Brněnec and started to work the factory.
- May 1945: Russians liberated Brněnec. Afterwards, the Communist government of Czechoslovakia nationalized the factory.
- 1989: Fall of Communism. The factory went into private hands. In its last years the factory made car seat covers and airline blankets. Its last general manager was František Olbert.
- 2010: The factory closed and was left abandoned. Afterwards, thieves stripped out much of its wood and metal.
- 2017: The local government of Brno invited the Low-Beers to come back to the area. František Olbert approached Daniel Löw-Beer.
- Daniel Löw-Beer works for the World Health Organization in Geneva and runs the Ark Foundation, which owns the factory. A portion of Schindler's Brünnlitz factory became the Museum of Survivors, opening in May 2025, 80 years after the end of World War II. Löw-Beer, whose family owned the factory starting in 1854, started the Ark Foundation in 2019. Funds were raised to restore the warehouse, and other buildings may also be restored.
