= František Bartoš (composer) =

František Bartoš (13 June 1905, Brněnec – 21 May 1973, Prague) was a Czech composer, music critic, musicologist and writer. He studied music composition with Karel Boleslav Jirák and Jaroslav Křička at the Prague Conservatory from 1921 through 1925. After this he participated in multiple masterclasses with the composer Josef Bohuslav Foerster. He wrote music criticism for Tempo magazine from 1935 to 1938 and again from 1946 to 1948. As a musicologist he published several scholarly works on Bedřich Smetana, and also wrote on other Czech composers and on Wolfgang Amadeus Mozart. As a composer his best known works are String Quartet no.2, op.10 (1935), the orchestral suite Měšťák šlechticem (1937), and Rozhlasová hudba for orchestra (1938).
