= Schindler's Ark =

1982 novel by Thomas Keneally

Schindler's Ark (Schindler's List)
- First edition cover
- Author: Thomas Keneally
- Language: English
- Genre: Biographical novel
- Publisher: Hodder and Stoughton
- Publication date: 18 October 1982
- Publication place: Australia
- Media type: Print (Hardcover and Paperback)
- Pages: 380 pp (hardcover edition)
- Awards: Booker Prize 1982
- ISBN: 0-340-27838-2 (hardcover edition)
- OCLC: 8994901
- Preceded by: The Cut-Rate Kingdom
- Followed by: A Family Madness

Schindler's Ark is a historical fiction published in 1982 by the Australian novelist Thomas Keneally. It is a fictionalised story based on the historical figure, Oskar Schindler. The United States edition of the book was titled Schindler's List; it was later reissued in Commonwealth countries under that name as well. The novel won the Booker Prize, a literary award conferred each year for the best single work of sustained fiction written in the English language, and was awarded the Los Angeles Times Book Prize for Fiction in 1983.

The book tells the story of Oskar Schindler, a member of the Nazi Party who becomes an unlikely hero by saving the lives of 1,200 Jews during the Holocaust. It follows actual people and events, with fictional dialogue and scenes added by the author where exact details are unknown. Keneally wrote a number of well-received novels before and after Schindler's Ark; however, in the wake of its highly successful 1993 film adaptation directed by Steven Spielberg, it has since gone on to become his best-known and celebrated work.

In 2022, the novel was included on the "Big Jubilee Read" list of 70 books by Commonwealth authors, selected to celebrate the Platinum Jubilee of Elizabeth II.

== Background ==
Poldek Pfefferberg, a Holocaust survivor and Schindlerjude, inspired Keneally to write Schindler's Ark. After the war, Pfefferberg had tried on a number of occasions to interest the screenwriters and filmmakers he met through his business in making a film based on the story of Schindler and his efforts to save Polish Jews from the Nazis, as well as arranging several interviews with Schindler for American television.

Keneally's meetings with Pfefferberg and his research and interviews of Schindler's acquaintances are detailed in his 2007 book Searching for Schindler: A Memoir. In October 1980, Keneally went into Pfefferberg's shop in Beverly Hills to ask about the price of briefcases. Learning that Keneally was a novelist, Pfefferberg showed him his extensive files on Schindler, kept in two cabinets in his back room. After 50 minutes of entreaties, Pfefferberg was able to convince Keneally to write the book. Pfefferberg became an advisor, accompanying Keneally to Poland, where they visited Kraków and other sites associated with the Schindler story. Keneally dedicated Schindler's Ark to Pfefferberg: "who by zeal and persistence caused this book to be written."

After the publication of Schindler's Ark in 1982, Pfefferberg worked to persuade Steven Spielberg to film Keneally's book, using his acquaintance with Spielberg's mother to gain access.

In 1996, the State Library of New South Wales, in Sydney, New South Wales, Australia, purchased some of the Pfefferberg documents that inspired Keneally, from a private collector, and they are now housed there.

In 2009, a carbon copy of Schindler's original 13-page list, initially thought to be lost, was discovered in the State Library of New South Wales in Sydney, Australia.

== Plot summary ==
This novel tells the story of Oskar Schindler, self-made entrepreneur and bon viveur who finds himself saving Polish Jews from the Nazi death machine. Based on numerous eyewitness accounts, Keneally's story takes place within Hitler's attempts to make Europe judenfrei (free of Jews). Schindler is presented as a flawed hero – a drinker, a womaniser and, at first, a profiteer. After the war, he was commemorated as Righteous Among the Nations by the Yad Vashem Holocaust Museum in Jerusalem, but was never seen as a conventionally virtuous character. The story is not only Schindler's, it is the story of Kraków's Ghetto and the forced labour camp outside town, Płaszów, and of Amon Göth, Płaszów's commandant.

His wife Emilie Schindler later remarked in a German TV interview that Schindler did nothing remarkable before the war and nothing after it. "He was fortunate therefore that in the short fierce era between 1939 and 1945 he had met people who had summoned forth his deeper talents." After the war, his business ventures failed and he separated from his wife. He ended up living a sparse life in a small flat in Frankfurt. Eventually he arranged to live part of the year in Israel, supported by his Jewish friends, and part of the year in Frankfurt, where he was often hissed at in the streets as a traitor to his "race". After 29 unexceptional postwar years, he died in 1974. He was buried in Jerusalem, as he wished, with the help of his old friend Pfefferberg.

== See also ==
- Jurek Becker: Jacob the Liar (1969)
- Louis Begley: Wartime Lies (1991)
