= Schindlerjuden =

Jews saved by Oskar Schindler during the Holocaust

Oskar Schindler (second from right) with a group of Jews he rescued during the Holocaust. The photo was taken in 1946, a year after World War II ended.

The Schindlerjuden, literally translated from German as "Schindler Jews", were a group of roughly 1,200 Jews saved by German industrialist Oskar Schindler during the Holocaust. They survived the years of the Nazi regime primarily through the intervention of Schindler, who afforded them protected status as industrial workers at his enamelware factory in Kraków, capital of the General Government, and after 1944, in an armaments factory in occupied Czechoslovakia. There, they avoided being sent to death camps and survived the genocide. Schindler expended his personal fortune made as an industrialist to save the Schindlerjuden.

The story of the Schindlerjuden has been depicted in the book Schindler's Ark (1982), by Thomas Keneally, and Steven Spielberg's film adaptation of the novel, Schindler's List (1993). Poldek Pfefferberg, one of the survivors, persuaded Keneally to write the novel and Spielberg to produce the film.

In 2012, over 8,500 descendants of Schindlerjuden were estimated to be living in the United States, Israel, and other countries.

== List ==
The original list of Schindlerjuden transported to Schindler's Brünnlitz factory in Brněnec, occupied Czechoslovakia, was prepared by Mietek Pemper, Itzhak Stern and Oskar Schindler in September and October 1944. That list likely no longer exists.

Another list with 1,000 names, compiled by Pemper upon the prisoners' arrival on 21 October 1944 at Schindler's Brünnlitz factory, was presented by him to the International Tracing Service in 1958.

Two lists of 1,098 prisoners made by camp administrators in Brünnlitz on 18 April 1945 are also extant and preserved in Yad Vashem Memorial, where Oskar and wife Emilie Schindler are recognized among the Righteous. The first list contains 297 female prisoners and the second contains 801 male prisoners. There are several preserved copies and carbon copies of the later list from April 1945, some in museums and others in private hands, mostly those of former prisoners' families.

== Notable Schindlerjuden ==
- Abraham Bankier (1895–1956), businessman and Schindler's factory manager
- Joseph Bau (1920–2002), artist, poet and writer
- Moshe Bejski (1921–2007), Israeli supreme court justice
- Hilde Berger (1914–2011), resistance fighter and Schindler's secretary
- Aleksander Bieberstein (1889–1979), doctor and writer
- Meir Bosak (1912–1992), historian, writer and poet
- Jerzy Gross (1929–2014), musician and public speaker
- Chaim Hilfstein (1876–1950), doctor and writer
- Laura Hillman (1923–2020), museum docent and writer
- Ryszard Horowitz (born 1939), photographer
- Helen Jonas-Rosenzweig (1925–2018), maid of Amon Göth, documentary subject
- Leon Leyson (1929–2013), teacher and writer
- Mietek Pemper (1920–2011), stenographer and writer
- Poldek Pfefferberg (1913–2001), business owner who inspired Schindler's Ark, portrayed by Jonathan Sagall in Schindler's List
- Mimi Reinhardt (1915–2022), secretary of Oskar Schindler
- Leon Richter (1907–1981), rabbi
- Leo Rosner (1918–2008), musician
- Itzhak Stern (1901–1969), Schindler's accountant, portrayed by Ben Kingsley in Schindler's List
- Moshe Taube (1927–2020), scholar and cantor

== Historiography ==
- Barber, Terry (2008). Oskar Schindler. Acts of Courage. Edmonton: Grass Roots Press. ISBN 9781894593854. OCLC 226302705.
- Bau, Joseph (1998). Dear God, have you ever gone hungry?. New York: Arcade Publishing. ISBN 1559704314. OCLC 38909925. A memoir by Schindler survivor Joseph Bau about his experiences during the Holocaust, being rescued by Schindler, and the impact of these experiences after the war.
- Biederman, Mark (2019). Schindler's Listed: The Search for My Father's Lost Gold. Boston. ISBN 9781644690086. OCLC 1066191883.
- Blair, Jon (1983). Schindler: The Real Story (Documentary). The documentary which provided much of the research for the Spielberg film.
- Brecher, Elinor J. (1994). Schindler's Legacy: True Stories of the List Survivors. New York, N.Y.: Plume. ISBN 0525939415. OCLC 31132329. A compilation of interviews with many of those saved by Schindler. Includes reports of their experiences in the concentration camps and with Schindler, and their stories of life after the war. Includes over one hundred personal photographs.
- Byers, Anne (2005). Oskar Schindler: Saving Jews From The Holocaust. Holocaust Heroes and Nazi Criminals. Berkeley Heights, NJ: Enslow Publishing. ISBN 0766025349. OCLC 56198745. A biography of Schindler, with emphasis on his rescue activities during the war. Part of the "Holocaust Heroes and Nazi Criminals" series for young adult readers. Includes glossary and index.
- Crowe, David M. (2004). Oskar Schindler: The Untold Account of His Life, Wartime Activities, and the True Story Behind the List. Cambridge, Mass.: Westview Press. ISBN 081333375X. OCLC 55679121. A comprehensive, academic account of Schindler's early life, business career, rescue attempts, and postwar experiences in Germany and Argentina. Based on numerous personal interviews and archival sources, including Schindler's personal papers discovered in 1997. Includes extensive bibliography and index.
- Fensch, Thomas C., ed. (1995). Oskar Schindler and His List: The Man, the Book, the Film, the Holocaust and Its Survivors. Forest Dale, Vermont. ISBN 0839764723. OCLC 32346222. A collection of essays, articles, and interviews which illuminate Schindler and the international effect of his story. Includes a reprint of an article written about Schindler in 1949 and sections about Thomas Keneally's book Schindler's List, Steven Spielberg's film adaptation of the story, and issues and implications of the Holocaust.
- Fogelman, Eva (1994). Conscience and Courage: Rescuers of Jews During the Holocaust. New York: Anchor Books. ISBN 0385420277. OCLC 28799011. Relates stories about Schindler and his efforts to save Jews in the context of other rescue efforts and courageous acts during the Holocaust. Examines the motivation of Schindler and other rescuers, including personal, psychological, and historical factors.
- Freedman, Carl (2009). Oskar Schindler Saved My Life. Xlibris. ISBN 9781441517180. OCLC 537640840.
- Gruntová, Jitka (2002). Legendy a fakta o Oskaru Schindlerovi (in Czech). Praha, Česká republika: Naše vojsko. ISBN 8020606076. OCLC 51191068. A comprehensive account of Schindler's life, creation of the famous list and the daily reality of the life in the Brünnlitz factory. Based on interviews, books and archival sources.
- Hillman, Laura (2005). i will plant you a lilac tree : a memoir of a Schindler's list survivor. New York: Atheneum Books for Young Readers. ISBN 0689869800. OCLC 55138767. The story of a Schindler's List survivor, her family, and her relationship with fellow inmate Dick Hillman in various concentration and labor camps during the Holocaust.
- Keneally, Thomas (1982). Schindler's Ark. New York: Simon and Schuster. ISBN 067144977X. OCLC 8627158. A fictional recreation of the story of Oskar Schindler, an industrialist who saved 1,100 Jews from death by employing them in his factory in Kraków. Drawn from authentic records, the testimony of many of those saved by Schindler, and the author's extensive research. Published under the title Schindler's List in the United States.
- Keneally, Thomas (2008). Searching for Schindler: A memoir. New York. ISBN 9780385526173. OCLC 191922795. A memoir by the author of Schindler's Ark about the process of writing the novel, and the movie based on the novel that followed. Includes the stories of Schindler survivors, especially focusing on Leopold "Poldek" Pfefferberg.
- Leyson, Leon (2013). The Boy on the Wooden Box: How the Impossible Became Possible... on Schindler's List. New York, New York: Simon & Schuster Children's Publishing. ISBN 9781442497825. OCLC 870564255. A memoir by one of the youngest Schindler survivors, who had to stand on a wooden box to operate factory machinery. Intended for young readers.
- Meltzer, Milton (1988). "Schindler's Jews". Rescue: The Story of How Gentiles Saved Jews in the Holocaust. New York: Harper & Row. pp. 55–67. ISBN 0060242094. OCLC 16980718. A brief, personal account of Schindler's life and heroism. Written for young adults.
- Müller-Madej, Stella (2006). A Girl From Schindler's List. Kraków: DjaF. ISBN 8386774479. OCLC 316442557. An autobiography by a young Schindler survivor and her family, from Kraków to Brünnlitz.
- Rosner Blay, Anna (1998). Sister, Sister. Sydney: Hale & Iremonger. ISBN 0868066478. OCLC 38830235. A biography of two Schindlerjuden sisters.
- O'Neil, Robin (2010). Oskar Schindler: Stepping Stone to Life: A Reconstruction of the Schindler Story. League City, Texas: Susaneking.com. ISBN 9780984594313. OCLC 841094409. A biography focusing on Oskar Schindler's rescue activity during the Holocaust, based on published and unpublished materials and eyewitness interviews conducted on and off by the author since 1987.
- Palowski, Franciszek (1998). The Making of Schindler's List: Behind the Scenes of an Epic Film. Translated by Ware, Anna; Ware, Robert G. Carol Publishing. ISBN 9781559724456. A behind-the-scenes look at the making of Schindler's List, including historical accounts of Schindlerjuden.
- Pérez, Javier Gómez (2014). Oskar Schindler's Jews: The 1,098 Jews Saved by Schindler. CreateSpace Independent Publishing Platform. ISBN 9781500629939. OCLC 969411593.
- Pemper, Mieczysław (2011). The Road to Rescue: The Untold Story of Schindler's List. New York: Other Press. ISBN 9781590514948. OCLC 707968457. A Schindler survivor's personal account of his activities during the Holocaust, including his forced employment by Amon Göth, including the assistance he provided to Schindler in his rescue operations, and his testifying against Göth in his war crime trial after the end of the war.
- Rawson, Andrew (2015). Schindler's Krakow: The City Under The Nazis. Barnsley, South Yorkshire: Pen and Sword Military. ISBN 9781473827974. OCLC 927963107.
- Revell, Anna (2017). Oskar Schindler: The True Story of Schindler's List. Amazon Digital Services LLC - Kdp. ISBN 9781549563065. OCLC 1091624045.
- Roberts, Jack L. (1995). Oskar Schindler. The Importance Of. San Diego: Lucent Books. ISBN 1560060794. OCLC 32242305. Interweaves the biography of Oskar Schindler with the larger events of the Holocaust, including the rise of anti-Semitism and the implementation of the "Final Solution." Briefly discusses Schindler's life after the war. Includes photographs. Written for young adults.
- Roberts, Jeremy (2000). Oskar Schindler: Righteous Gentile. Holocaust Biographies (Nonfiction). New York: Rosen Publ. Group. ISBN 0823933105. OCLC 43993458.
- Schindler, Emilie (1997). Where Light and Shadow Meet: A Memoir. W W NORTON & Company. ISBN 9780393336177. An autobiography by Oskar Schindler's wife, written with the help of Erika Rosenberg, telling her story from childhood to after the war. Presents a detailed, behind-the-scenes account of the list's development and the steps taken to save Jews. Includes numerous photos and two maps.
- Seliger, Mark (2012). When They Came to Take My Father: Voices of the Holocaust. Arcade Pub. ISBN 9781611455021. OCLC 793726774. Includes a section on Schindlerjude Sol Urbeck.
- Sher, Aubrey J. (2009). Leopold And Oskar: Page - No. 173 Of Schindler's List. AuthorHouse. ISBN 9781438974187.
- Silver, Eric (1992). "The Few Who Disobeyed". The Book of the Just: The Unsung Heroes Who Rescued Jews from Hitler. London: Weidenfeld and Nicolson. pp. 147–152. ISBN 0802113478. OCLC 25632453. Uses personal testimony and historical documents to construct a more personal picture of Schindler and to describe the great lengths he took to save Jews by employing them in his factory and bargaining for their lives.
- Skotnicki, Aleksander B. (2008). Oskar Schindler in the Eyes of Cracovian Jews Rescued by Him. Kraków: Wydawn. AA. ISBN 9788389368997. OCLC 228073965. Examines Schindler's legacy through testimony gathered from the Polish Jews saved by his efforts. Contains articles discussing Schindler, the list, and Płaszów concentration camp and the enamelware factory. A short list of films, press reports, and books is also presented, along with numerous photos from a variety of sources.
- Spielberg, Steven (2014). Testimony: The Legacy of Schindler's List and the USC Shoah Foundation. USC Shoah Foundation. New York, NY. ISBN 9780062285188. OCLC 874131335.
- Trautwein, Dieter (2000). Oskar Schindler, -- immer neue Geschichten : Begegnungen mit dem Retter von mehr als 1200 Juden (in German).
- Thompson, Bruce (2002). Oskar Schindler. People Who Made History. San Diego: Greenhaven Press. ISBN 0737708948. OCLC 47844895.
- Wukovits, John F. (2002). Oskar Schindler. Heroes & Villains. San Diego: Lucent Books. ISBN 156006952X. OCLC 49029597.
- Zuckerman, Abraham (1994). A Voice in the Chorus: Memories of a Teenager Saved by Schindler. Stamford, CT: Longmeadow Press. ISBN 0681007850. OCLC 30158776. A survivor's personal narrative describing his life in Kraków before the war, his imprisonment in concentration camps, and his rescue by Oskar Schindler. Also tells of his life after the war. Includes personal photographs. Previously published as A Voice in the Chorus: Life as a Teenager in the Holocaust.
