= Brněnec =

- Municipality
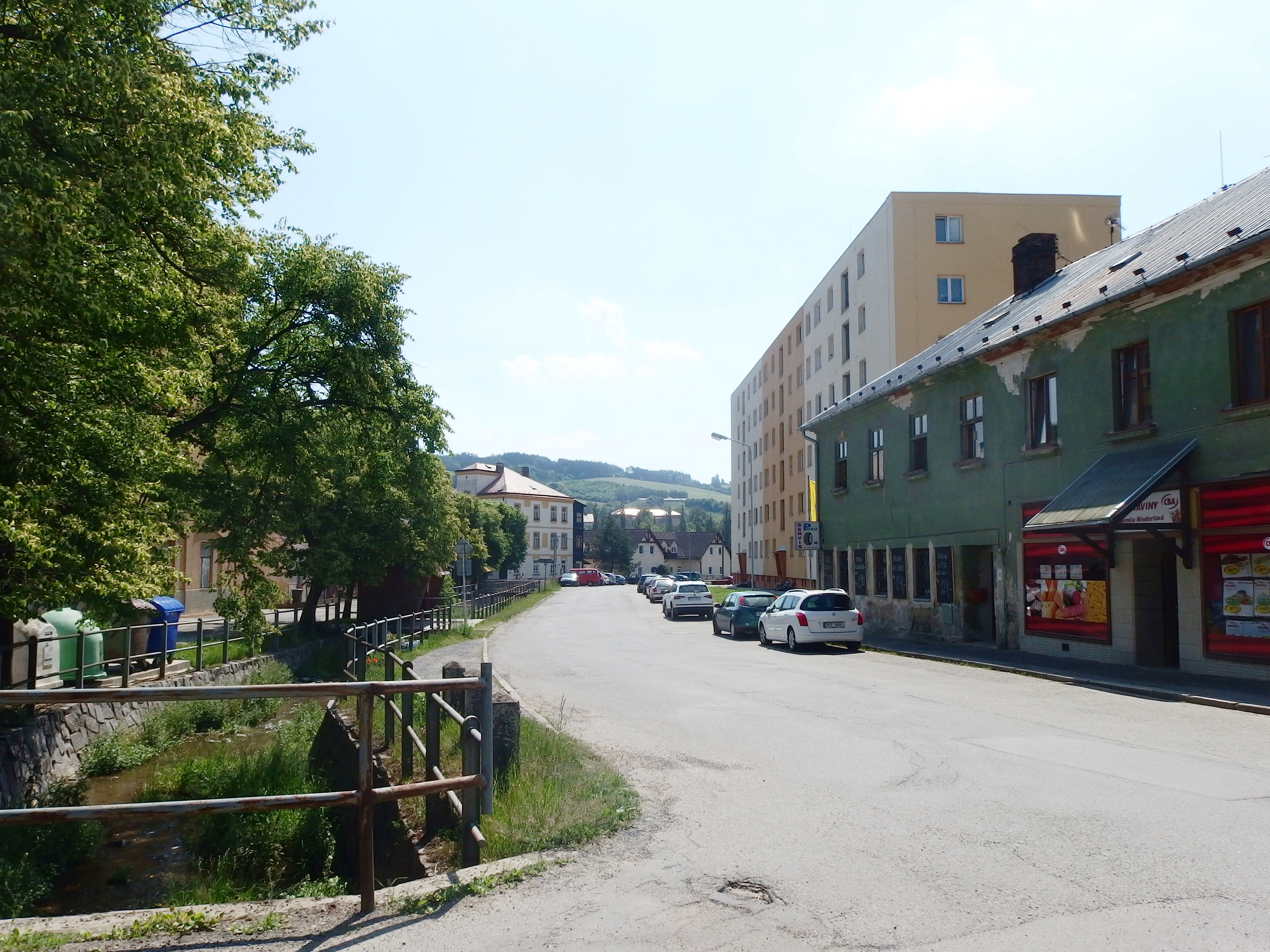
- Main street

- Flag Coat of arms

- Location in the Czech Republic
- Coordinates: 49°37′39″N 16°31′19″E
- Country: Czech Republic
- Region: Pardubice
- District: Svitavy
- First mentioned: 1557

Area
  - Total: 6.30 km^{2} (2.43 sq mi)
- Elevation: 370 m (1,210 ft)

Population (2026-01-01)
  - Total: 1,221
  - Density: 194/km^{2} (502/sq mi)
- Time zone: UTC+1 (CET)
  - Summer (DST): UTC+2 (CEST)
- Postal code: 569 04
- Website: obec.brnenec.cz

Brněnec (Czech pronunciation: [ˈbr̩ɲɛnɛts]; German: Brünnlitz) is a municipality and village in Svitavy District in the Pardubice Region of the Czech Republic. It has about 1,200 inhabitants. The municipality is located on the Svitava River in the Svitavy Uplands. Brněnec is known as the place where Oskar Schindler had his factory during World War II, thanks to which he saved the lives of hundreds of Jews.

== Administrative division ==
Brněnec consists of four municipal parts (in brackets population according to the 2021 census):

- Brněnec (391)
- Chrastová Lhota (68)
- Moravská Chrastová (728)
- Podlesí (24)

== Etymology ==
The name Brněnec was derived from the personal name Brnen and was created as a diminutive of Brno.

== Geography ==
Brněnec is located about 15 kilometres (9 mi) south of Svitavy and 45 km (28 mi) north of Brno. It lies in the Svitavy Uplands. The highest point is at 555 m (1,821 ft) above sea level. The municipality is situated at the confluence of the Svitava River and the stream Chrastovský potok; the built-up area is located in the valleys of these two watercourses. The Svitava River forms here the historical border between Bohemia and Moravia.

== History ==
Next to an old trade route, the settlement of Moravská Chrastová was founded after 1200 by monks from the monastery in Litomyšl. Moravská Chrastová was first mentioned in a document from 1323. The first written mention of Brněnec is in the act of partition of the Svojanov estate from 1557. Until the 18th century, it was a part of Bělá nad Svitavou. After the Löw-Beer family founded here a textile factory, the importance of Brněnec grew.

In 1938, the municipality was annexed by Nazi Germany and administered as part of the Reichsgau Sudetenland. After World War II, the Germans were expelled.

=== Schindler factory ===
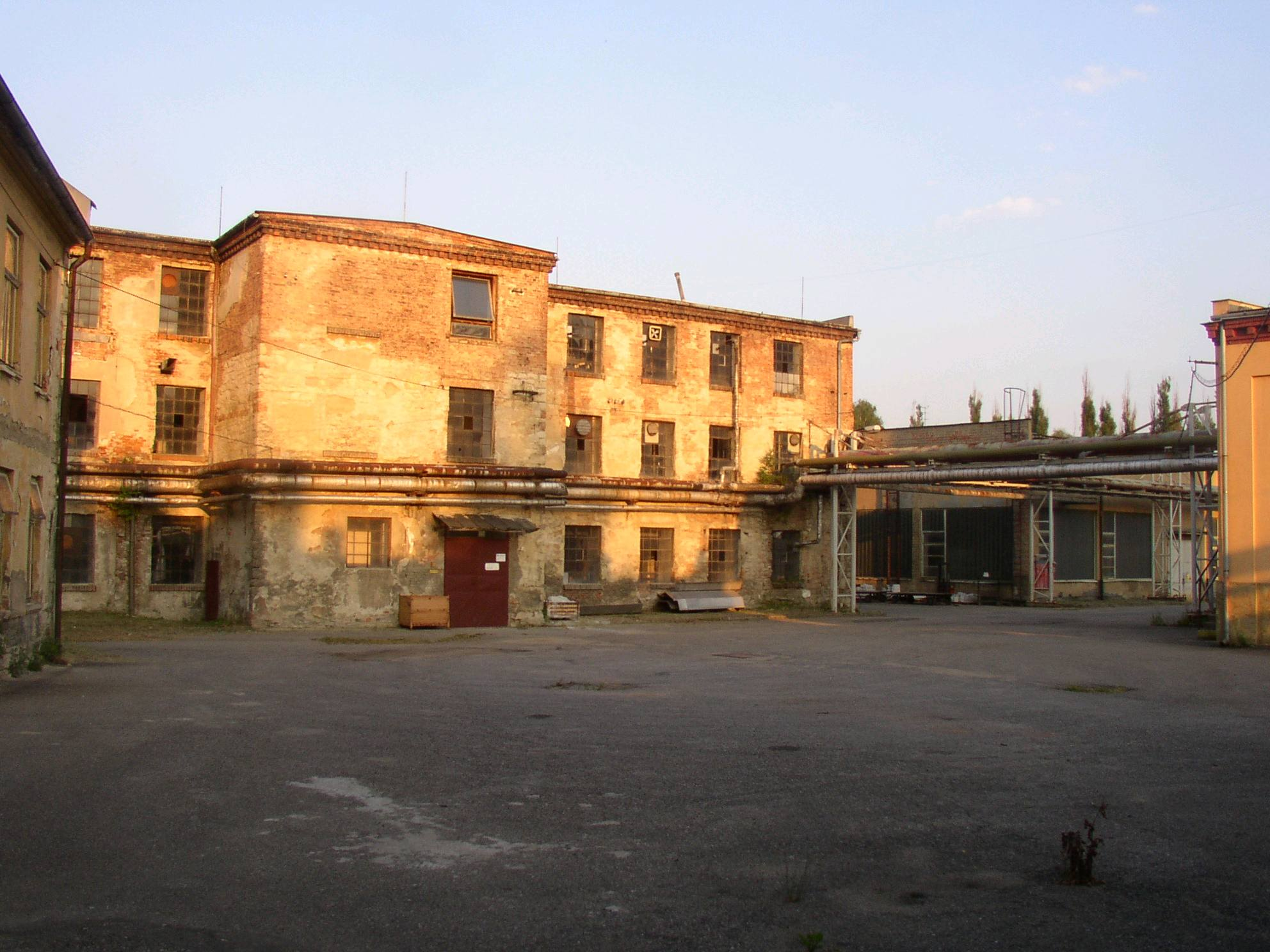
Schindler's factory in 2004

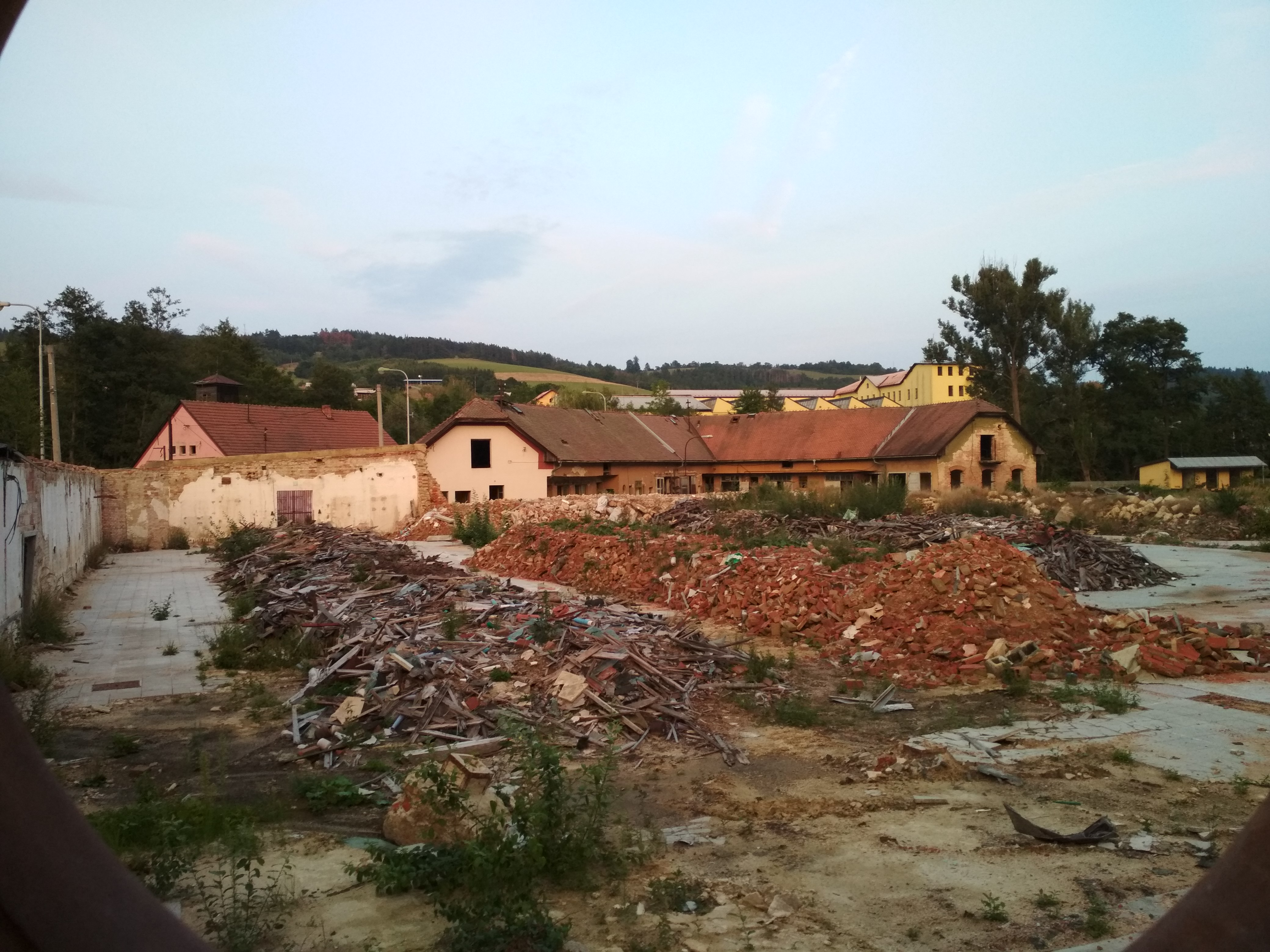
The premises of the factory in 2019

The Löw-Beer Jewish family founded a textile producing company in the 1810s, and in 1855 rebuilt an old paper mill in Brněnec into the textile factory. In 1938, it was taken over by Germans.

In 1944, Oskar Schindler relocated his German Enamelware Factory and the associated prison camp of 1,200 Jewish forced labourers from Kraków to a munitions factory acquired by him in Brněnec. The Jewish workforce thus escaped transport to the extermination camps and was liberated along with the rest of the municipality on 10 May 1945 by the Red Army, after the factory had been fully operational for seven months.

== Demographics ==
Historical population

| Year | Pop. | ±% |
|---|---|---|
| 1869 | 784 | — |
| 1880 | 977 | +24.6% |
| 1890 | 1,470 | +50.5% |
| 1900 | 1,675 | +13.9% |
| 1910 | 1,929 | +15.2% |

| Year | Pop. | ±% |
|---|---|---|
| 1921 | 1,618 | −16.1% |
| 1930 | 1,866 | +15.3% |
| 1950 | 1,308 | −29.9% |
| 1961 | 1,471 | +12.5% |
| 1970 | 1,556 | +5.8% |

| Year | Pop. | ±% |
|---|---|---|
| 1980 | 1,608 | +3.3% |
| 1991 | 1,559 | −3.0% |
| 2001 | 1,427 | −8.5% |
| 2011 | 1,298 | −9.0% |
| 2021 | 1,211 | −6.7% |

Source: Censuses

== Transport ==
The I/43 road (part of the European route E461) from Brno to Svitavy runs through the municipality.

Moravská Chrastová is located on the railway line heading from Brno to Česká Třebová.

== Sights ==
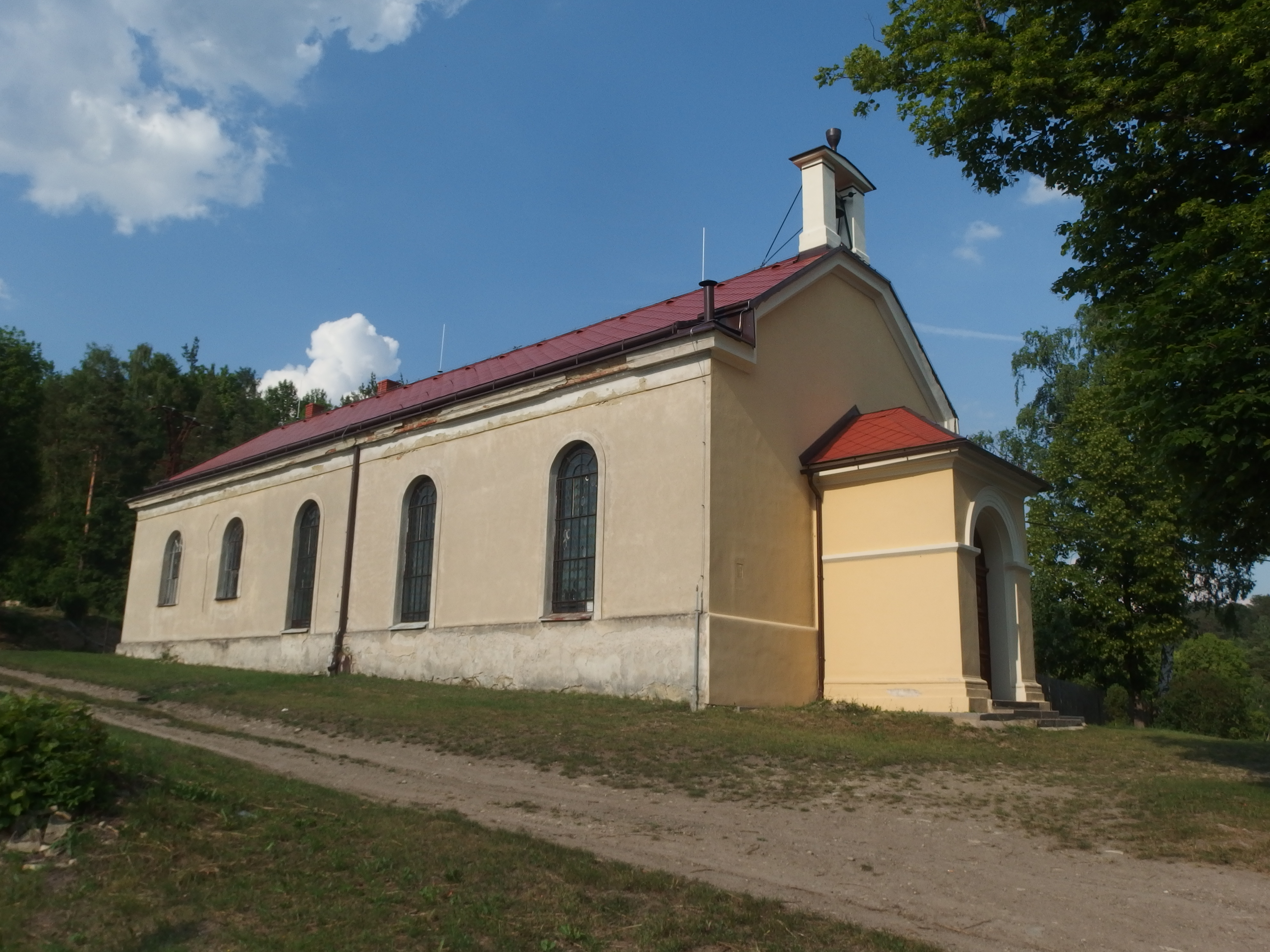
Evangelical church

The most important monument is the Evangelical church in Moravská Chrastová. It was built in the Arts and Crafts style in 1889. Other sights include the Chapel of Saint Isidore in Moravská Chrastová from 1855 and a belfry in Brněnec.

In 2025, the Museum of Survivors was opened in Brněnec. The opening date was chosen to coincide with the celebrations marking eighty years since the end of World War II.

== Notable people ==
- František Bartoš (1905–1973), composer, music critic and musicologist
- Oskar Schindler (1908–1974), German industrialist and humanitarian; worked here
