= Bohaterów Getta Square =

Town square located in Kraków, Poland

Bohaterów Getta Square in Kraków
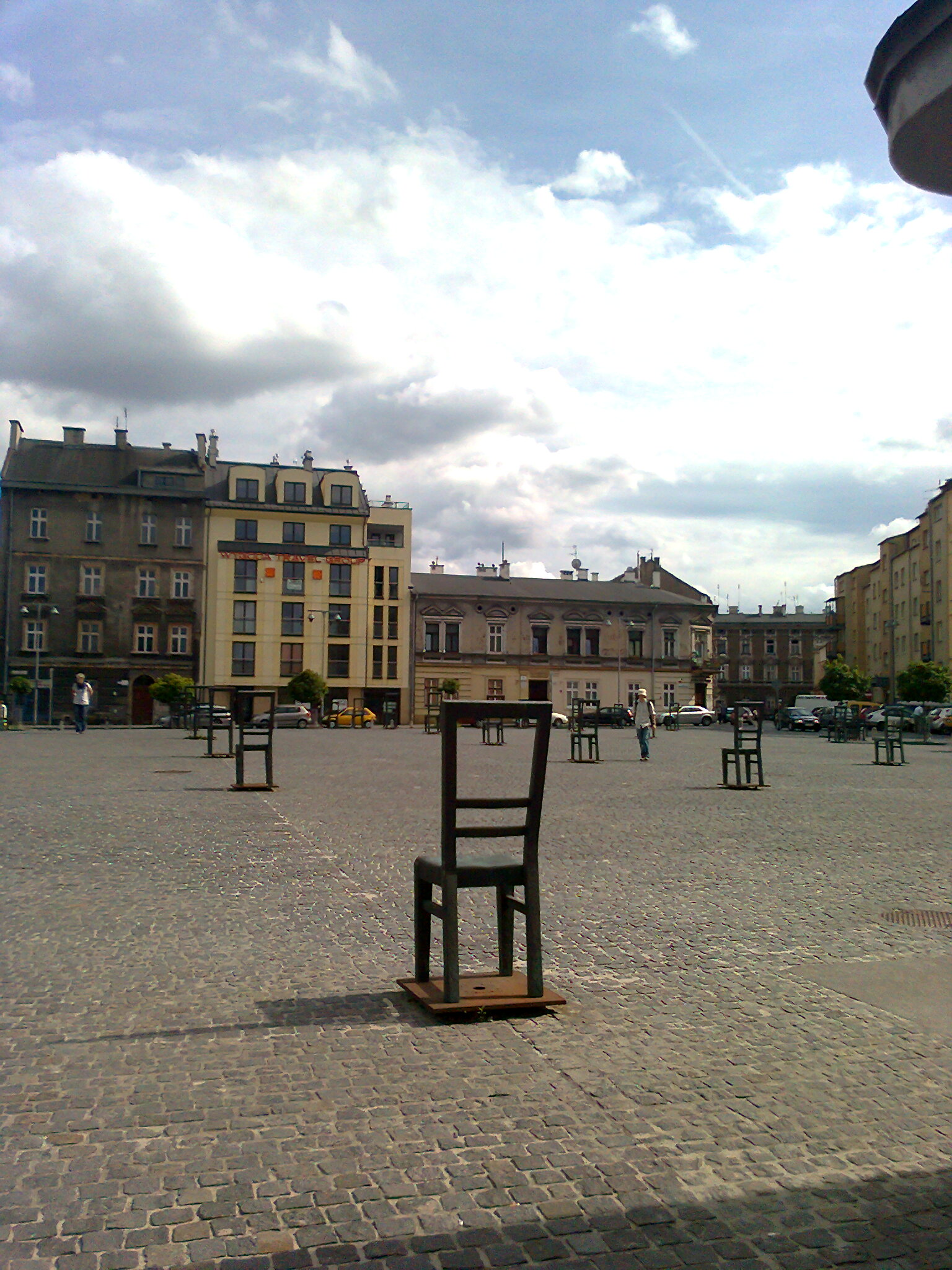
- Interactive map of Bohaterów Getta Square in Kraków
- Type: Town square
- Location: Kraków, Lesser Poland Voivodeship, Poland
- Coordinates: 50°2′48.12″N 19°57′15.12″E

Bohaterów Getta Square (known as Mały Rynek until around 1880, Zgody Square from 1917 to 1948) is a square located in the Podgórze district of Kraków. Its first name translates as "Small Market Square", the second as "Square of Concord", and the current one as "Heroes of the Ghetto Square".

Between 1941 and 1943, it was located within the boundaries of the Kraków Ghetto. It served as a place of concentration for the Jewish population prior to their deportation to concentration camp. At number 18 operated the Eagle Pharmacy, run by Tadeusz Pankiewicz, the only non-Jewish resident of the ghetto.

In 2005, the square was redeveloped; among other changes, the bus station building was demolished and rebuilt from scratch. After the reconstruction was completed, a monument commemorating the Kraków Ghetto and the Jews of Kraków was unveiled in the square. The memorial consists of 70 chairs. Its creators, Piotr Lewicki and Kazimierz Łatak, were inspired by a passage from Tadeusz Pankiewicz’s book "The Kraków Ghetto Pharmacy", in which the author described furniture being carried out into the square during the clearing of houses after the last ghetto residents had been deported. In 2006, the memorial received a special mention in the European Prize for Urban Public Space competition, and in 2011 it was awarded the Gold Award in the Urban Quality Award 2011 competition.

== Bibliography ==
- Jafiszow, Maja; Kubisztal, Paweł; Szydło, Grzegorz (2010). Plac Bohaterów Getta. Kraków: vis-à-vis/Etiuda. ISBN 978-83-61516-49-1.
- "Bohaterów Getta, plac". Encyklopedia Krakowa. Warszawa; Kraków: Wydawnictwo Naukowe PWN. 2000. pp. 74–75. ISBN 83-01-13325-2.
