= Podgórze (disambiguation) =

Podgórze (meaning roughly "foot of the hill") may refer to the following places in Poland:

- Podgórze, Zgorzelec County in Lower Silesian Voivodeship (south-west Poland)
- Podgórze, former town and former quarter of Kraków
- Podgórze, district of the city of Kraków
- Podgórze, Lubin County in Lower Silesian Voivodeship (south-west Poland)
- Podgórze, Kuyavian-Pomeranian Voivodeship (north-central Poland)
- Podgórze, Lublin Voivodeship (east Poland)
- Podgórze, Podlaskie Voivodeship (north-east Poland)
- Podgórze, Suwałki County in Podlaskie Voivodeship (north-east Poland)
- Podgórze, Łask County in Łódź Voivodeship (central Poland)
- Podgórze, Łęczyca County in Łódź Voivodeship (central Poland)
- Podgórze, Kielce County in Świętokrzyskie Voivodeship (south-central Poland)
- Podgórze, Ostrowiec County in Świętokrzyskie Voivodeship (south-central Poland)
- Podgórze, Białobrzegi County in Masovian Voivodeship (east-central Poland)
- Podgórze, Gostynin County in Masovian Voivodeship (east-central Poland)
- Podgórze, Lipsko County in Masovian Voivodeship (east-central Poland)
- Podgórze, Ostrołęka County in Masovian Voivodeship (east-central Poland)
- Podgórze, Płock County in Masovian Voivodeship (east-central Poland)
- Podgórze, Pomeranian Voivodeship (north Poland)
- Podgórze, Braniewo County in Warmian-Masurian Voivodeship (north Poland)
- Podgórze, Elbląg County in Warmian-Masurian Voivodeship (north Poland)
- Podgórze, Myślibórz County in West Pomeranian Voivodeship (north-west Poland)
- Podgórze, Wałcz County in West Pomeranian Voivodeship (north-west Poland)
