= Lion Tenement =

Under the Lion Tenement, Boreckiego Tenement, Koczowiczowska Tenement
- Kamienica pod Lwem
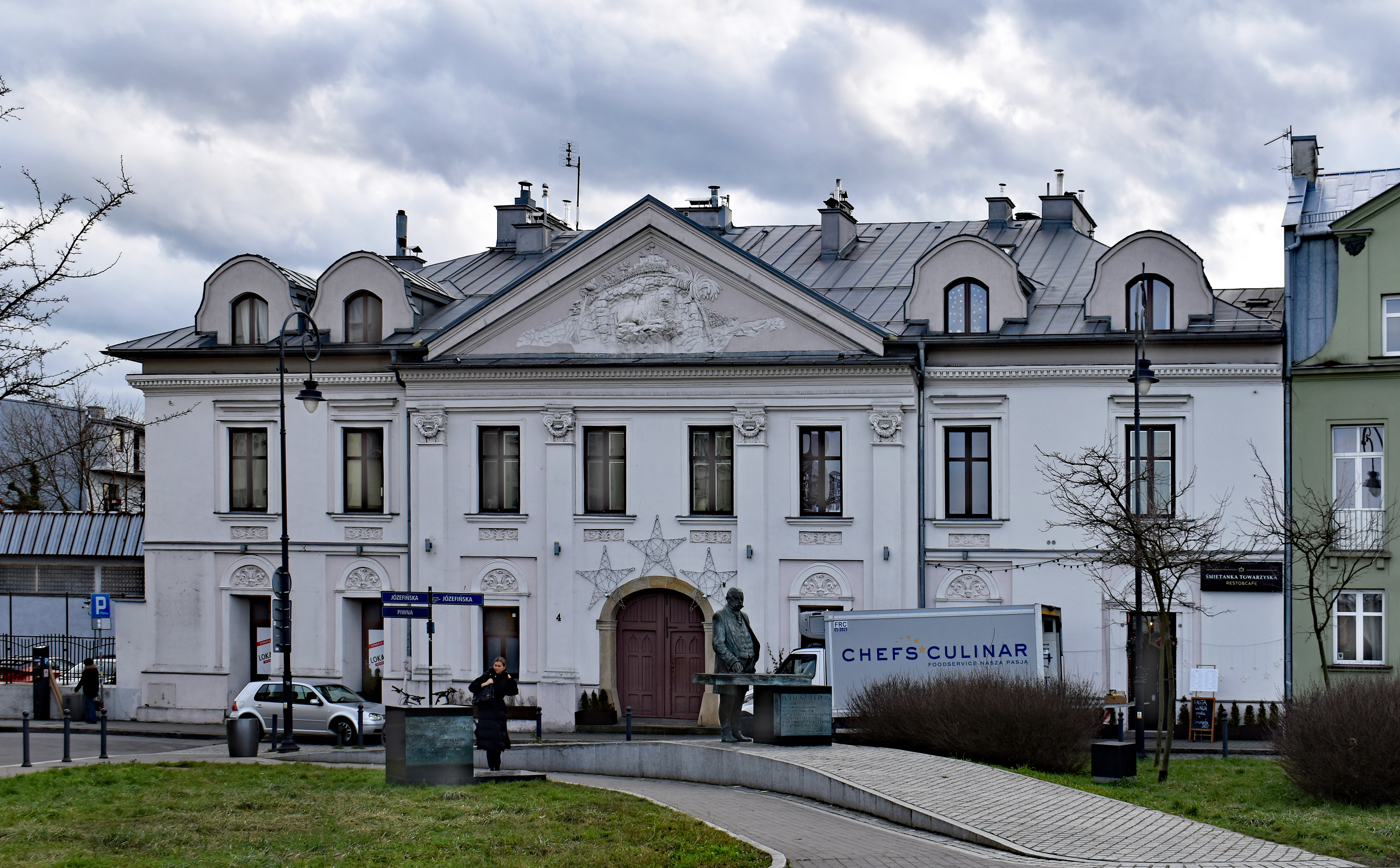

General information
- Address: 4 Józefińska Street
- Town or city: Kraków
- Country: Poland
- Coordinates: 50°02′44.8″N 19°56′56.2″E

Under the Lion Tenement House (also known as the Boreckiego Tenement, Koczowiczowska Tenement, formerly the Inn Under the Lion) (Polish: Kamienica pod Lwem) is a tenement house located at 4 Józefińska Street in Kraków in the district Podgórze.

== History ==
The Neoclassical building likely dates back to the late 18th century (around 1785) and was reconstructed in the early 19th century. In the second half of the 19th century, the roof was remodeled from a mansard to a hipped roof. The facade's ornamentation, including a large lion relief, has been preserved, as well as the historic vaults on the ground and first floors.

The building served as an inn near the border bridge (initially Charles Bridge, later Podgórski Bridge) between Austria and Kraków.

On April 20, 1936, the villa was entered into the Registry of Cultural Property. It is also entered into the municipal register of monuments of the Lesser Poland Voivodeship.
