= Mike Staner =

Mieczyslaw "Mike" Staner (1924 – August 29 2003) was a Holocaust survivor and author.

== Biography ==
Mieczyslaw Staner was born in the Kraków suburb of Podgórze, and was educated first in a state Primary School and later in a Hebrew Gymnasium on Podbrzezie street in Kazimierz, the oldest Jewish Quarter in Kraków, which was founded by the late Dr. Hilfstein.

He survived the Second World War, after having lived in Kraków Ghetto and been deported to the Nazi concentration camps of Kraków-Płaszów and Mauthausen, near Linz.

After the war he completed his education and got a bachelor's degree in mechanical engineering. He left Poland in 1954 and spent over 4 years in Israel, Canada and Australia, working as a professional Automotive Engineer with several technical engineering publications to his credit.

He retired to take care of his sickening wife and under her inspiration he became a professional writer and an international lecturer promoting his book "The Eyewitness", which was based on his own experiences of the Holocaust.

After his wife's death he returned to Poland where he devoted his energy and time to charity work. He died on 29 August 2003 in Kraków.

== Publications ==
- Ties of Blood. Story of Mike Staner as told to Victoria Steele. 1999. ISBN 978-83-905794-3-6.
