= Eagle Pharmacy =

Museum in Kraków, Poland

Eagle Pharmacy Museum
- Muzeum "Apteka Pod Orłem"
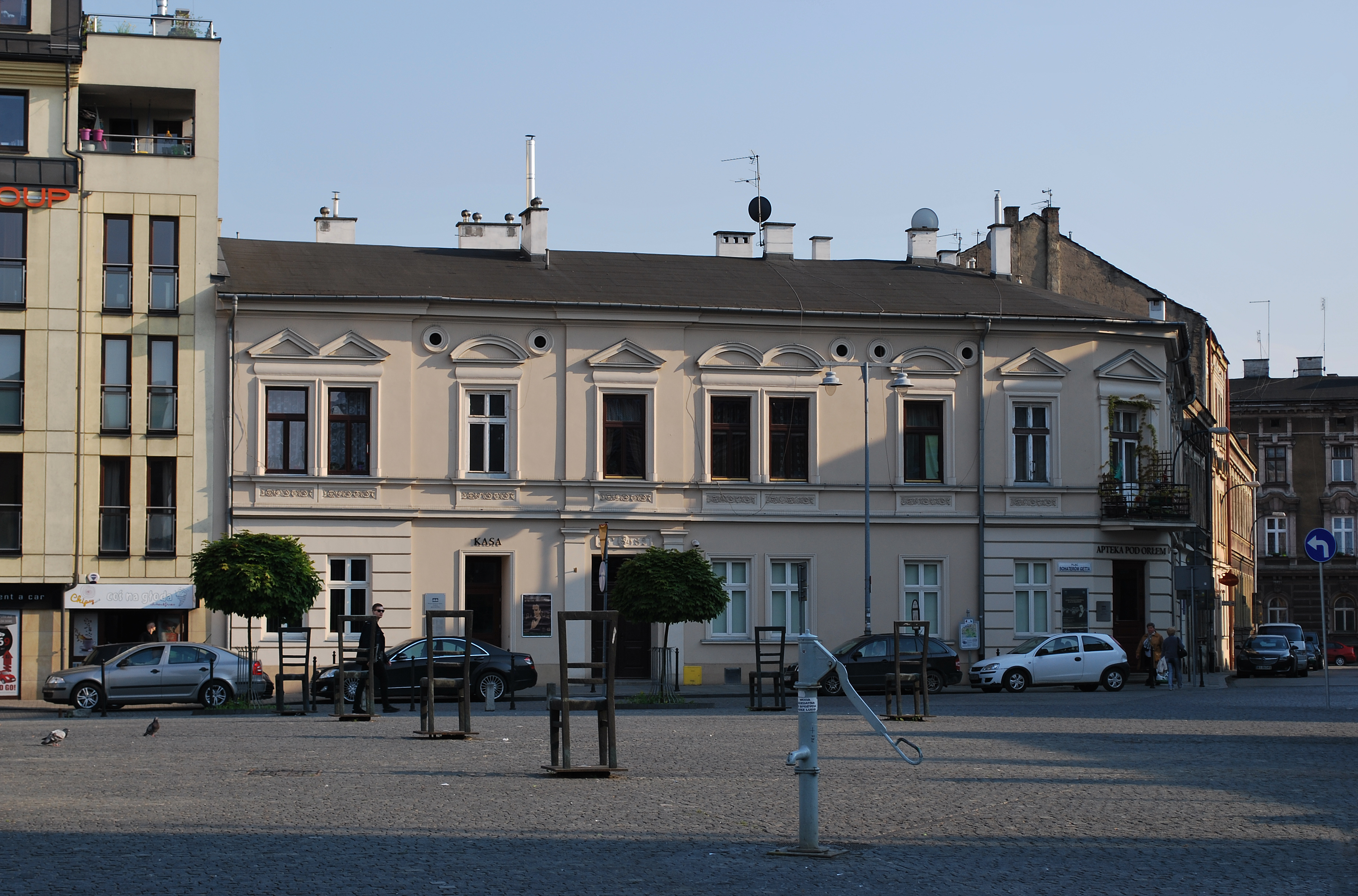
- Branch of Historical Museum of Kraków
- Established: April 22, 1983
- Location: 18 Bohaterów Getta Square; Kraków; Poland
- Coordinates: 50.04625°N 19.95414°E
- Type: History museum
- Manager: Monika Bednarek
- Director: Michał Niezabitowski
- Curator: Monika Bednarek
- Public transit access: Miejskie Przedsiębiorstwo Komunikacyjne w Krakowie how to get there, see external links
- Website: https://muzeumkrakowa.pl/en/branches/eagle-pharmacy

The Eagle Pharmacy Museum (Polish: Muzeum "Apteka Pod Orłem") is a branch of the Historical Museum of Kraków located at 18 Bohaterów Getta Square in Podgórze, the former district of Kraków, Poland.

Originally established as a private pharmacy in 1910, during World War II it operated within the Kraków Ghetto. Its owner, Tadeusz Pankiewicz, was the only non-Jewish Pole permitted to remain and operate a business inside the ghetto. The pharmacy served as a vital hub for clandestine aid, communication, and resistance, providing shelter, medical supplies, and moral support to the persecuted Jewish community.

After the war, the site was gradually transformed into a commemorative museum. The permanent exhibition opened in 2003 following contributions from Holocaust survivor and filmmaker Roman Polanski.

== History ==
In 1910 its proprietor was Jozef Pankiewicz. Tadeusz Pankiewicz (21 November 1908 – 5 November 1993) was his son who ran it beginning in 1933. Before World War II, it was one of four pharmacies in the Podgórze district. Its clients were both Polish and Jewish residents. One frequent customer was "Bikkur Cholim" charity.

In March 1941, the Nazis established a ghetto in Podgórze for Kraków's Jews. Pankiewicz's pharmacy was the only one within its borders, while its proprietor was the only Pole with rights to remain within it. The Nazis decreed that all signs and other public inscriptions had to be redone in Hebrew throughout the Krakow ghetto. The only exception was the Polish sign over the entranceway to Pankiewicz’s pharmacy, "Pod Orłem".

The Jews in the ghetto chose the pharmacy as a meeting place. Among them were writer Mordechai Gebirtig, painter Abraham Neumann, Dr. Julian Aleksandrowicz, neurologist Dr. Bernhard Bornstein, Dr Leon Steinberg and pharmacists Emanuel Herman and Roman Imerglück. Soon it became a source of resources and medicines, which helped in avoiding deportation: hair dyes used for rejuvenating the appearance, luminal (fenobarbital) used to calm children in hiding, smuggled in luggage beyond the ghetto.

During the bloody displacement at Plac Zgody in 1942, Pharmacy personnel issued free medicines and dressings while its recessed areas were used as shelters to save Jews. During the bloody liquidation of the Krakow ghetto in March 1943, Pankiewicz provided many parents with drugs to help their children sleep while in hiding.

Pankiewicz and his assistants Irena Drozdzikowska, Aurelia Danek and Helena Krywaniuk were liaisons between Jews in the ghetto and beyond it, passing information and smuggling food. They also were depositaries of valuables entrusted to them by deported Jews in the moments before leaving the ghetto.

As early as 1951 the pharmacy was nationalized by the Polish state, but Pankiewicz retained the right to use the building until 1955. The pharmacy was finally closed in 1967, and a bar was located there until 1981. Two years later, in 1983 a small historical exhibition opened in the building while Pankiewicz was still alive, and in 2003, thanks to Roman Polanski's donation, once a prisoner of the Krakow ghetto, the museum was expanded.
