= Tadeusz Pankiewicz =

Polish pharmacist and "Righteous Among the Nations"

- Tadeusz Pankiewicz
- Born: 21 November 1908; Sambor, Poland
- Died: 5 November 1993 (aged 84); Kraków
- Occupation: Pharmacist
- Known for: Holocaust rescue

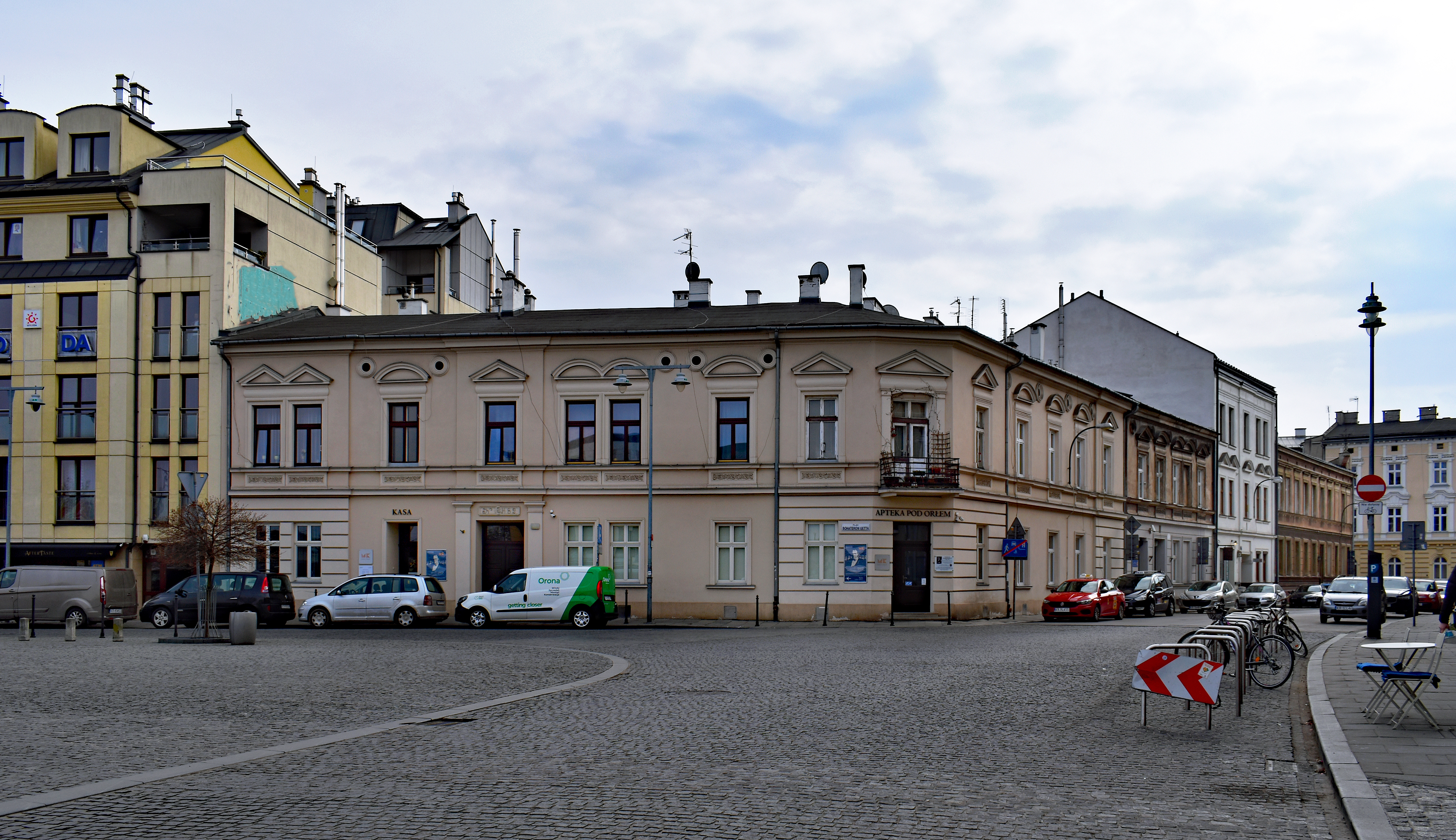
Under the Eagle Pharmacy, Kraków

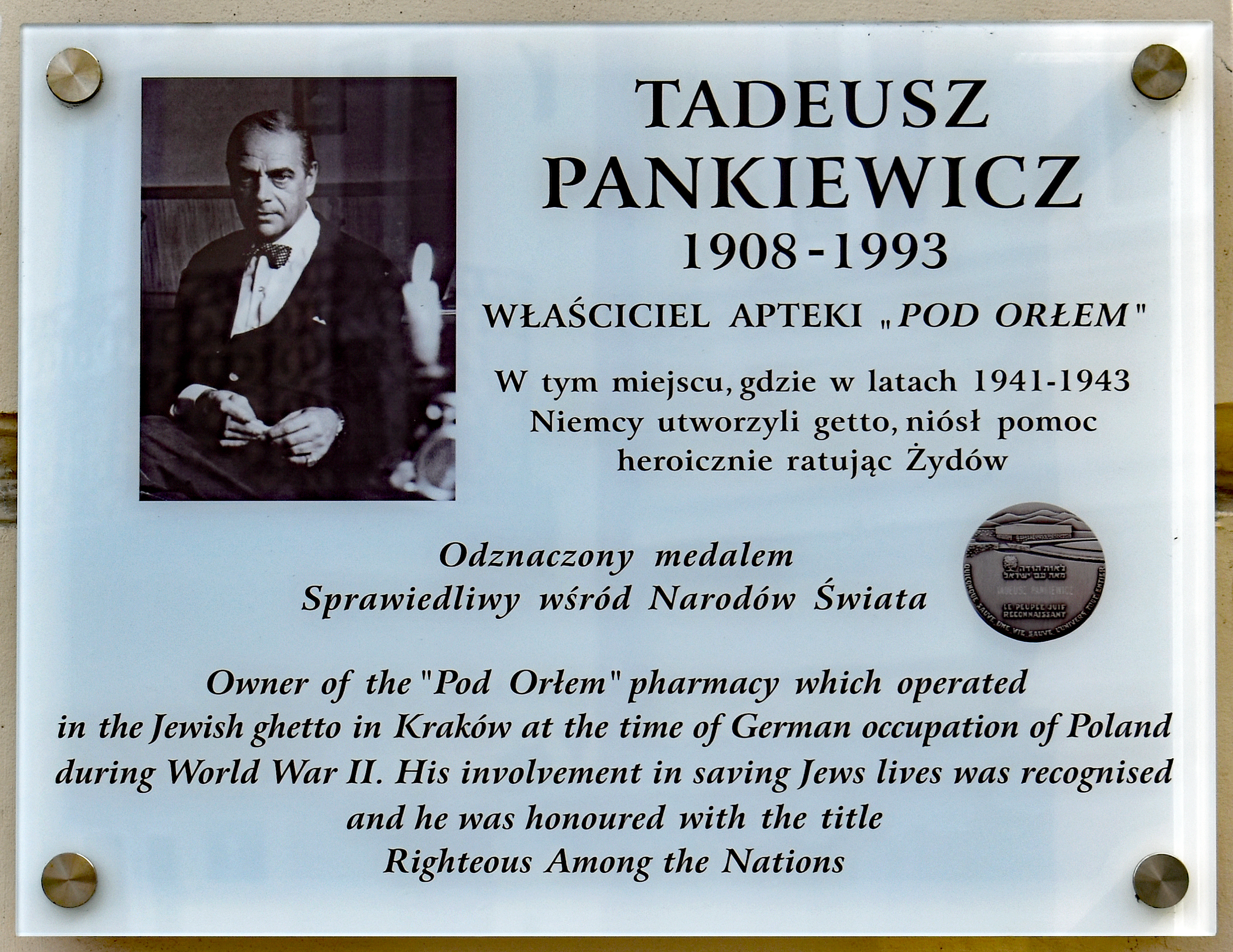
Commemorative plaque

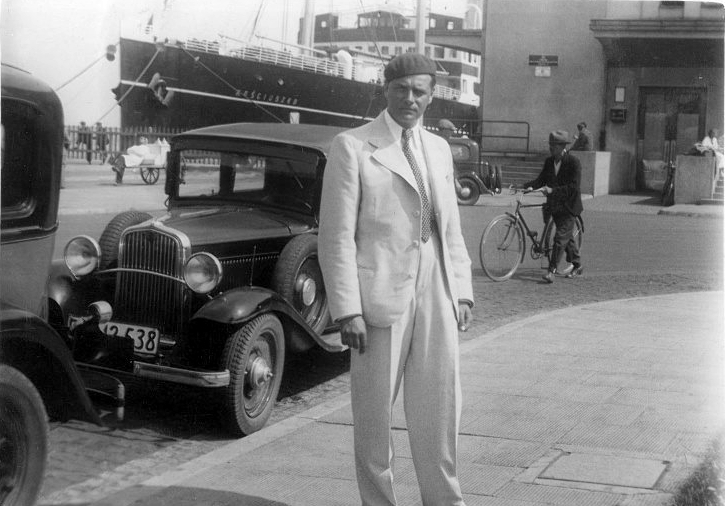
Tadeusz Pankiewicz in Gdynia, 1936

Tadeusz Pankiewicz (November 21, 1908, in Sambor – November 5, 1993, buried in Kraków), was a Polish Roman Catholic pharmacist, operating in the Kraków Ghetto during the Nazi German occupation of Poland. He was recognized as "Righteous Among the Nations" by Yad Vashem on February 10, 1983, for rescuing countless Jews from the Holocaust.

Pankiewicz studied at the Jagiellonian University in Kraków. In 1933, he took over the proprietorship of the Under the Eagle Pharmacy founded in 1910 by his father Jozef. The pharmacy was situated on Plac Zgody (formerly Mały Rynek square) in Kraków's Podgórze district. Its prewar clientele included both Gentile Poles and Jews.

== In the Kraków Ghetto ==
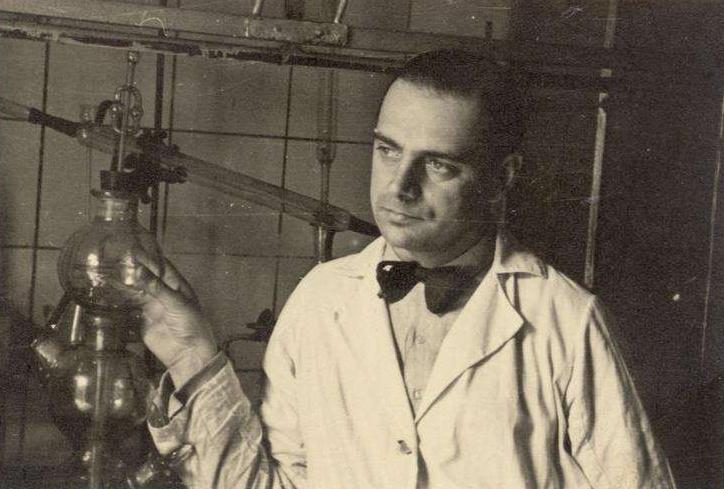
Pankiewicz in his Pharmacy around 1941

Under the German occupation of Poland during World War II, Podgórze district was closed off in March 1941 as a ghetto for local area Jewry. Within the walls of the Kraków Ghetto, there were four prewar pharmacies owned by non-Jews. Pankiewicz was the only proprietor to decline the German offer of relocating to the gentile (non-Jewish) side of the city. He was given permission to continue operating his establishment as the only pharmacy in the Ghetto, and reside on the premises. His staff were given passage permits to enter and exit the ghetto for work.

The often-scarce medications and pharmaceutical products supplied to the ghetto's residents, often free of charge, substantially improved their quality of life. In effect, apart from health care considerations, they contributed to survival itself. In his published testimonies, Pankiewicz makes particular mention of hair dyes used by those disguising their identities and tranquilizers given to fretful children required to keep silent during Gestapo raids.

The pharmacy became a meeting place for the ghetto's intelligentsia, and a hub of underground activity. Pankiewicz and his staff, Irena Drozdzikowska, Helena Krywaniuk, and Aurelia Daner-Czortkowa, risked their lives to undertake numerous clandestine operations: smuggling food and information, and offering shelter on the premises for Jews facing deportation to the camps. One of the surviving 'Schindlerjude', Stella Müller-Madej, described Pankiewicz as “a wonderful human being” and remained close to him after the war. On one occasion, he hid Stella under his desk during a German Aktion or roundup in the ghetto.

== After World War II ==
In 1947 Pankiewicz published a book of his memoirs called 'Apteka w Getcie Krakowskim' (English: The Pharmacy in the Krakow ghetto).

On February 10, 1983, Tadeusz Pankiewicz was awarded recognition as a "Righteous Among the Nations" for his wartime activities in rescuing Jews. In April of that year, he was present at the inauguration of the national heritage museum housed in the Apteka Pod Orłem building. Tadeusz Pankiewicz died in 1993 and is buried in Kraków's Rakowicki Cemetery.

In April 1983, the "Pod Orlem" pharmacy, located at No.18 Plac Bohaterów Ghetta (Ghetto Heroes Plaza, renamed), opened its doors as the Museum of National Remembrance, featuring the history of Kraków Jewry with a special focus on the ghetto period. In 2003, it became affiliated with the municipal Historical Museum of Kraków. The wartime activities of Pankiewicz and his staff are featured in an exhibition on the history of the Jewish ghetto in Kraków.

The pharmacy was featured in the film Schindler's List. The film's director Steven Spielberg donated $40,000 for the building's preservation, for which he was honored by the city of Kraków with its prestigious "Patron of Culture" award for the year 2004. He was not the only director of a Holocaust-related movie, who paid tribute to Pankiewicz's activity: in 2002 Roman Polanski, once a prisoner of the Krakow ghetto himself, donated a sum of money for the expansion of the museum in the former pharmacy.

== Bibliography ==
- The Krakow Ghetto Pharmacy by Tadeusz Pankiewicz, translated from the Polish by Garry Malloy. Kraków: Wydawnictwo Literackie, 2013. ISBN 978-83-08-05114-6.
- The Cracow Ghetto Pharmacy (translation by Henry Tilles of Apteka w getcie krakowskim). New York: Holocaust Library, 1987. ISBN 0-89604-086-0, 089604 0879. The book Apteka w Getcie Krakowskim is also available in Hebrew with reprinted editions, published by Yad Vashem and translated from Polish by writer Miriam Akavia.
- Wladyslaw Bartoszewski and Zofia Lewin, Righteous Among Nations: How Poles helped the Jews, 1939–1945. London: Earlscourt Publications, 1969, pp. 222–226. Includes first-person testimony by Pankiewicz.
- Wladyslaw Bartoszewski and Zofia Lewin, The Samaritans: Heroes of the Holocaust (translated from the Polish: Ten jest z ojczyzny mojej, 1966), ed. Alexander T. Jordan. N.Y.: Twayne Publishers, 1970, pp. 173–178.
- Sara Bender and Shmuel Krakowski, eds., The Encyclopedia of the Righteous Among the Nations: Rescuers of Jews during the Holocaust. Poland, Volume II. Jerusalem: Yad Vashem Publications, 2004, p. 579.
- The Eagle Pharmacy: History and Memory: A Collection of Essays Accompanying the Permanent Exhibition Tadeusz Pankiewicz's Pharmacy in the Krakow Ghetto by Jan Gryta, Muzeum Historyczne Miasta Krakowa, 2013. ISBN 9788375771213.
