= Podgórze, Kraków =

Former town, former XXII quarter of Kraków, Poland

Podgórze
- Former city Former XXII quarter of Kraków
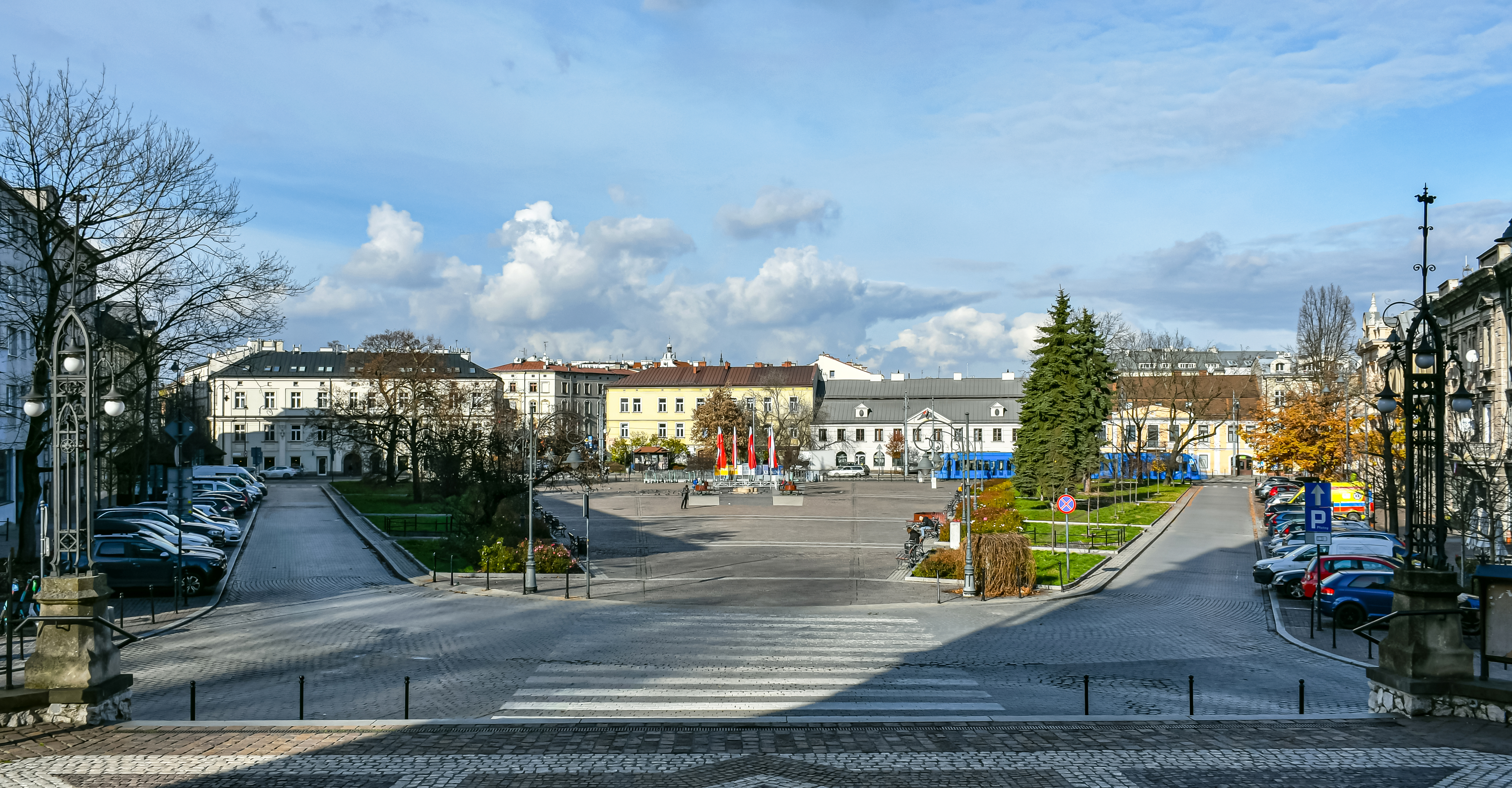
- Podgórski Market Square former Main Market Square of the city of Pogórze

- Podgórze on the map of the district XIII Podgórze
- Coordinates: 50°02′39″N 19°56′56″E
- City: Kraków

Historic Monument of Poland
- Designated: 1994-09-08
- Part of: Kraków historical city complex
- Reference no.: M.P. 1994 nr 50 poz. 418

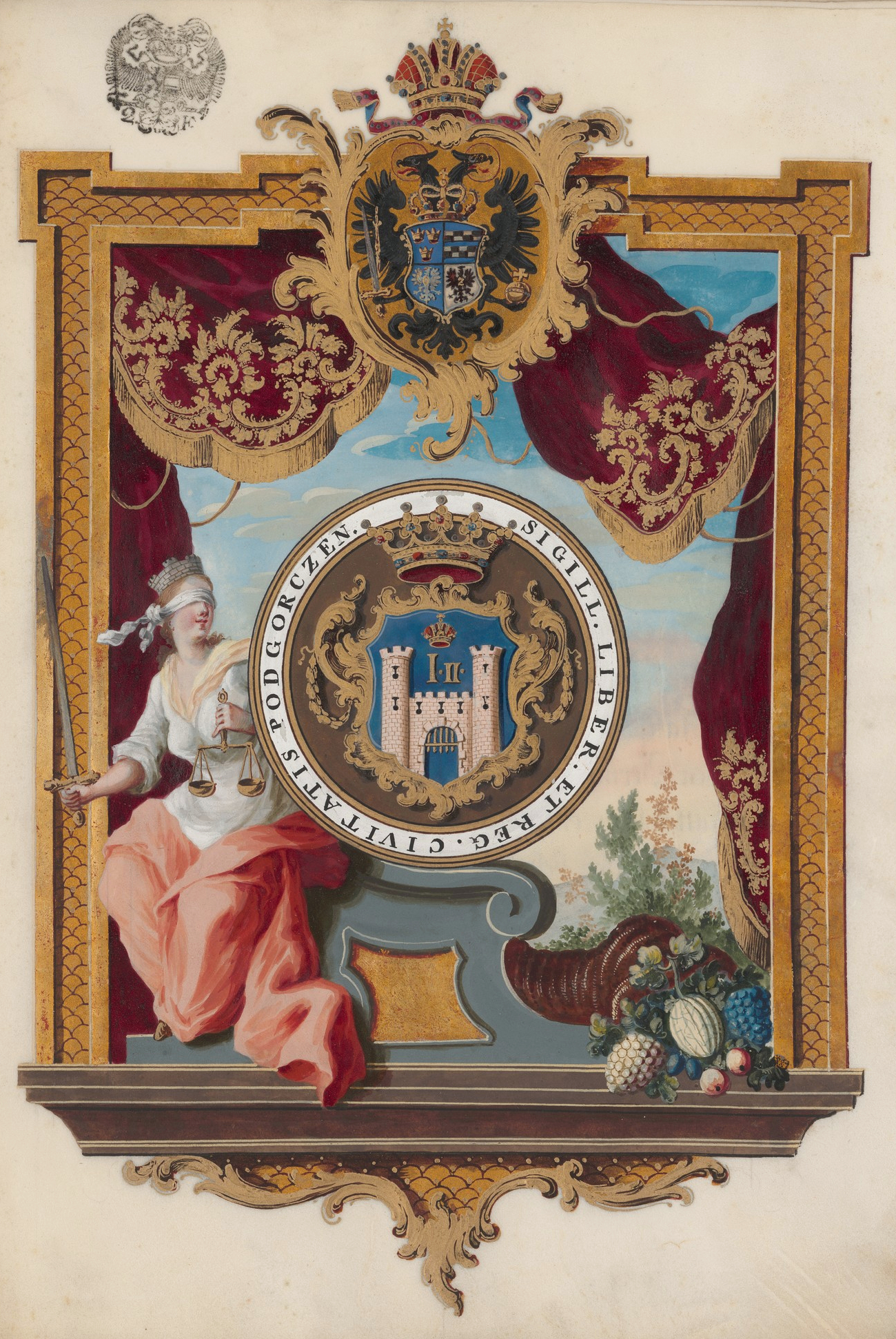
First coat of arms of the City of Podgórze (1785)

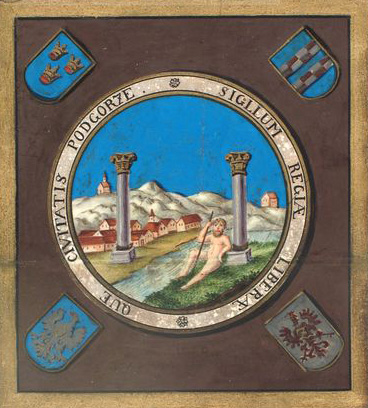
Second coat of arms of the City of Podgórze

Podgórze (officially: Royal, Free City of Podgórze, Polish: Królewskie, Wolne Miasto Podgórze) former, from 26 February 1784 independent city, since 1915 connected (as the XXII quarter) with Kraków, Poland, situated on the right (southern) bank of the Vistula River, at the foot of Lasota Hill.

It is now part of the district XIII Podgórze.

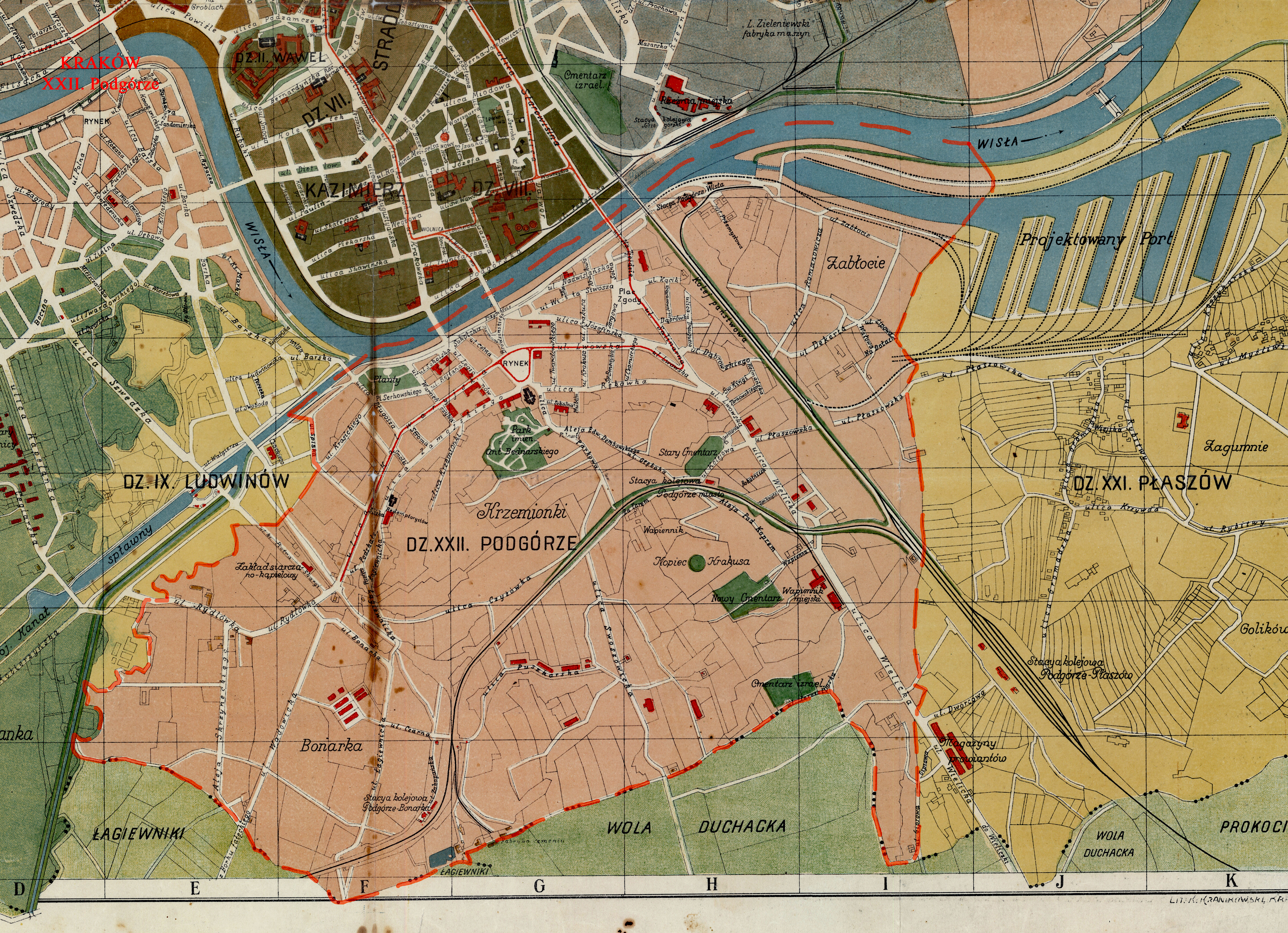
City of Podgórze until 1915

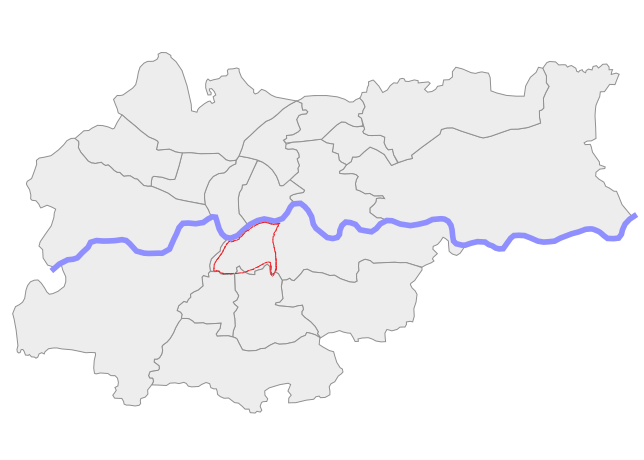
Former city of Podgórze and the current districts of Kraków

== History ==
The oldest man-made structure in Podgórze is the Krakus Mound (Polish: Kopiec Krakusa) on Lasota Hill, believed to be the grave of the legendary prince Krakus. It is the largest prehistoric mound in Poland and one of the best view points in the city.

The name Podgórze roughly translates as the base of a hill. Initially a small settlement, in the years following the First Partition of Poland the town's development was promoted by the Austria-Hungary Emperor Joseph II who in 1784 granted it the city status, as the Royal Free City of Podgórze. In the following years it was a self-governing administrative unit. After the Third Partition of Poland in 1795 and the takeover of the entire city by the Empire, Podgórze lost its political role of an independent suburb across the river from the Old Town.

The Austrian bridge named Carl's Bridge (German: Karls Brücke), linking Podgórze with the Kraków proper across the Vistula was built in 1802. This wooden structure located between today's Gazowa and Brodzińskiego streets, survived only until 1813 when it was destroyed in a flood.

The administrative reform of 1810 which followed the expansion of the Duchy of Warsaw brought Podgórze together with the rest of the historic city. However, after the Congress of Vienna made Kraków a free city in 1815, Podgórze fell back under the Austrian rule and remained there for the rest of the 19th century. According to Encyclopædia Britannica, in 1910 it was the 13th largest town in the Austrian-ruled Galicia (population 18,142 in 1900). In the years leading to the return of Polish independence, the city council discussions from July 1915 made Podgórze again a part of the Greater Kraków (Wielki Kraków); its president, the vice president of a single administrative unit.

Towards the end of the Austrian rule, in 1915 the size of Podgórze reached 1/5 of the size of Kraków. Since the return of Poland's independence, it remained integrated into the city. It includes the historic part of Podgórze with the triangular market square and impressive St. Joseph Church as well as the green hills of Krzemionki with the World War II quarry called Liban attached to the infamous Plaszow concentration camp. It also includes the site of the Nazi Kraków Ghetto and a factory of Oskar Schindler who saved nearly 1,200 Jews from the camps, as well as the old villages (now suburbs) of Płaszów, Rybitwy and Przewóz.

Jews from Kraków and the nearby villages were ordered to move into the created ghetto, an area of about 20 hectares, until 20 March 1941. Once the so-called 'Special Resettlement Commission' identified 2 square meters of living space for each inhabitant as suitable, about 18,000 people, several families in an apartment, were now cramped into a small area inside Podgorze district. Initially, the area was surrounded with barbed wire under security, and as early as April 1941, a three-meter-high wall was erected around the perimeter, the upper part of which replicated the shape of the Jewish gravestones.

== Landmarks ==
- Krakus Mound – early medieval tumulus
- St Benedict's Church on Lasota Hill – originally founded in the early 11th century, rebuilt in the 15th or 16th century
- Fort "Benedykt" – built 1853–1856 as a part of Kraków Fortress
- Podgórze City Hall – built 1838–1844 and rebuilt in the years 1891–1892 in the Renaissance Revival style
- Church of Our Lady of Perpetual Help – Redemptorist church and monastery, designed by Jan Sas Zubrzycki and built between 1902 and 1906 in Romanesque and Gothic Revival style
- St. Joseph's Church – designed by Jan Sas Zubrzycki and built between 1905 and 1909 in the Gothic Revival style
- Kraków TV Tower – built 1961–1968
- Cricoteka Centre for the Documentation of the Art of Tadeusz Kantor – built over a former power station in the years 2009–2014
- Eagle Pharmacy – a museum in the only pharmacy located in the Kraków Ghetto in Podgórze during the German occupation of Kraków, which served as an underground supply, aid and contact point for Jews living in the ghetto
- Oskar Schindler's Enamel Factory – former Oskar Schindler's factory, which now hosts two museums: the Museum of Contemporary Art in Kraków in the former workshops, and a branch of the Historical Museum of the City of Kraków in the administrative building
- Kraków-Płaszów concentration camp – Nazi concentration camp constructed on the grounds of two former Jewish cemeteries in 1943 and liberated by the Red Army in 1945
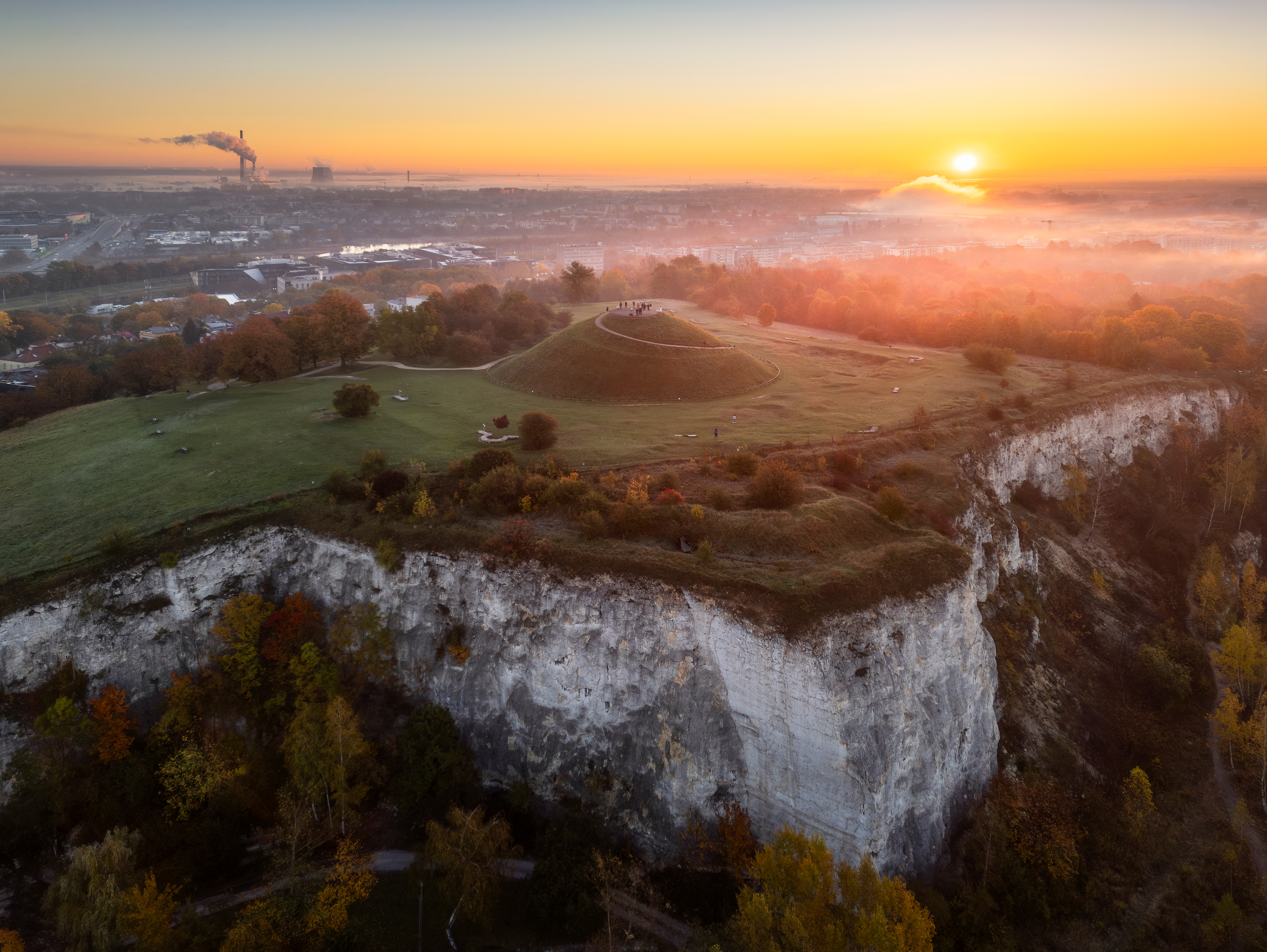
Krakus Mound
view from the west

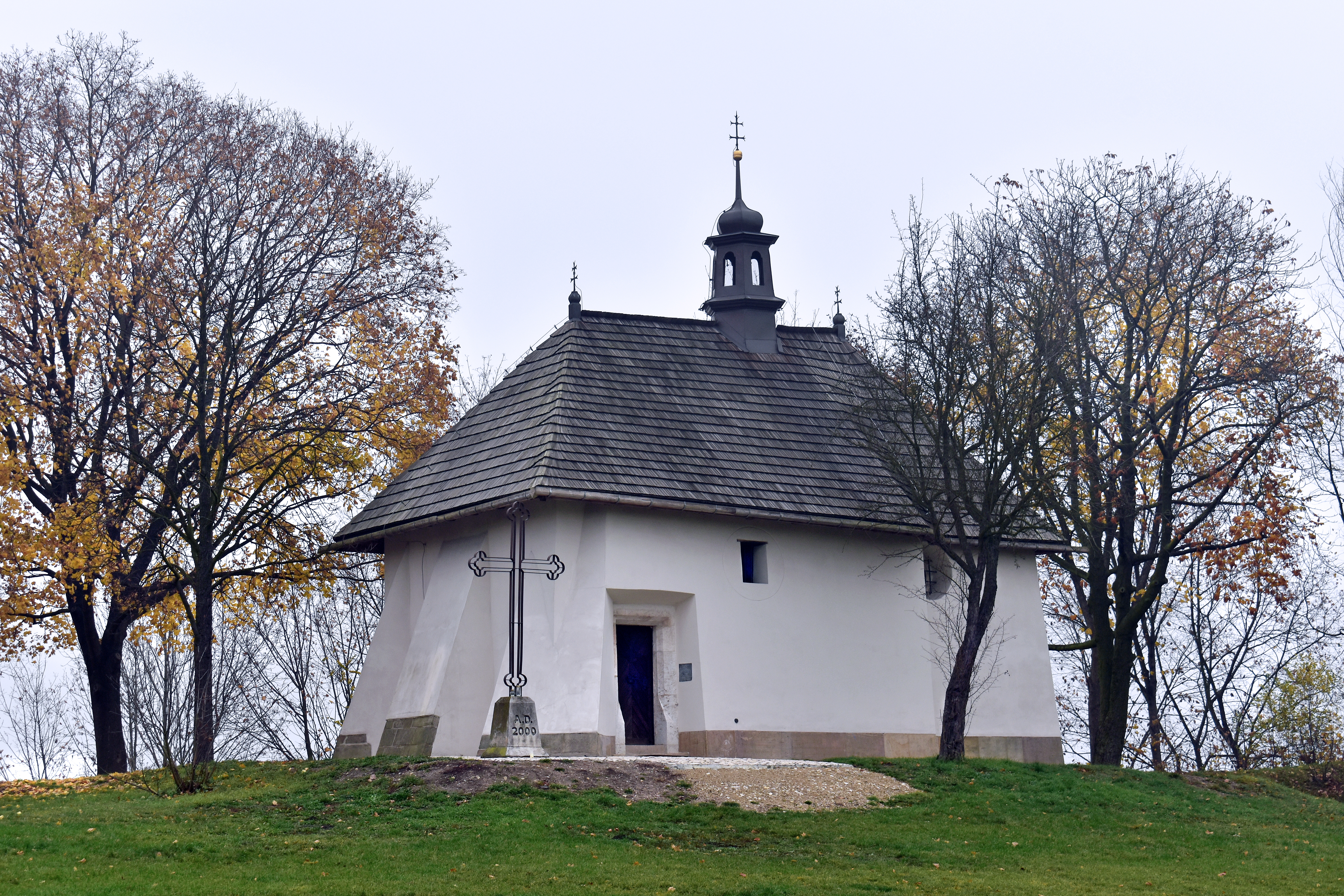
St Benedict's Church

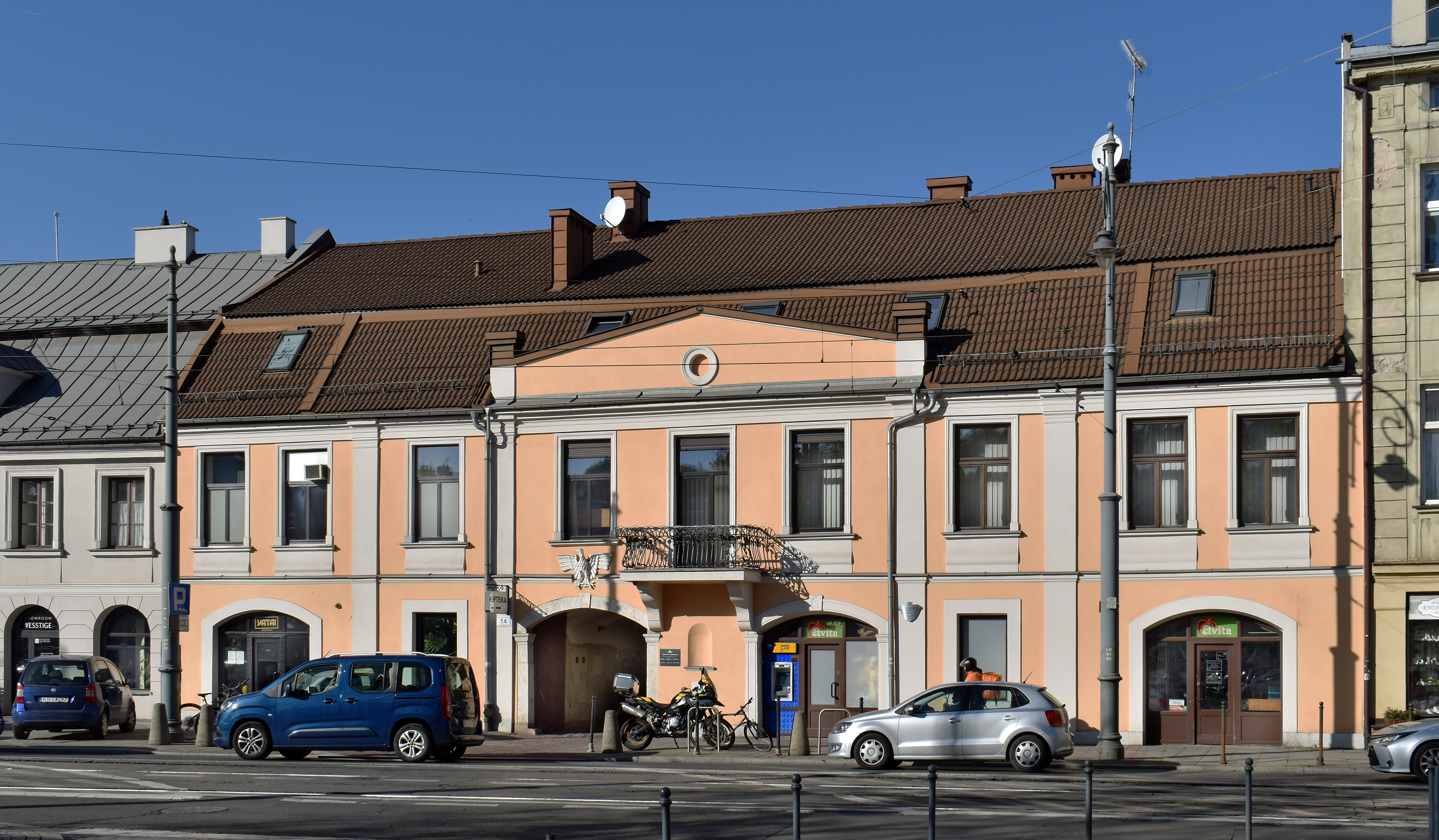
Manor House "Under White Eagle"
Podgórze first City Hall

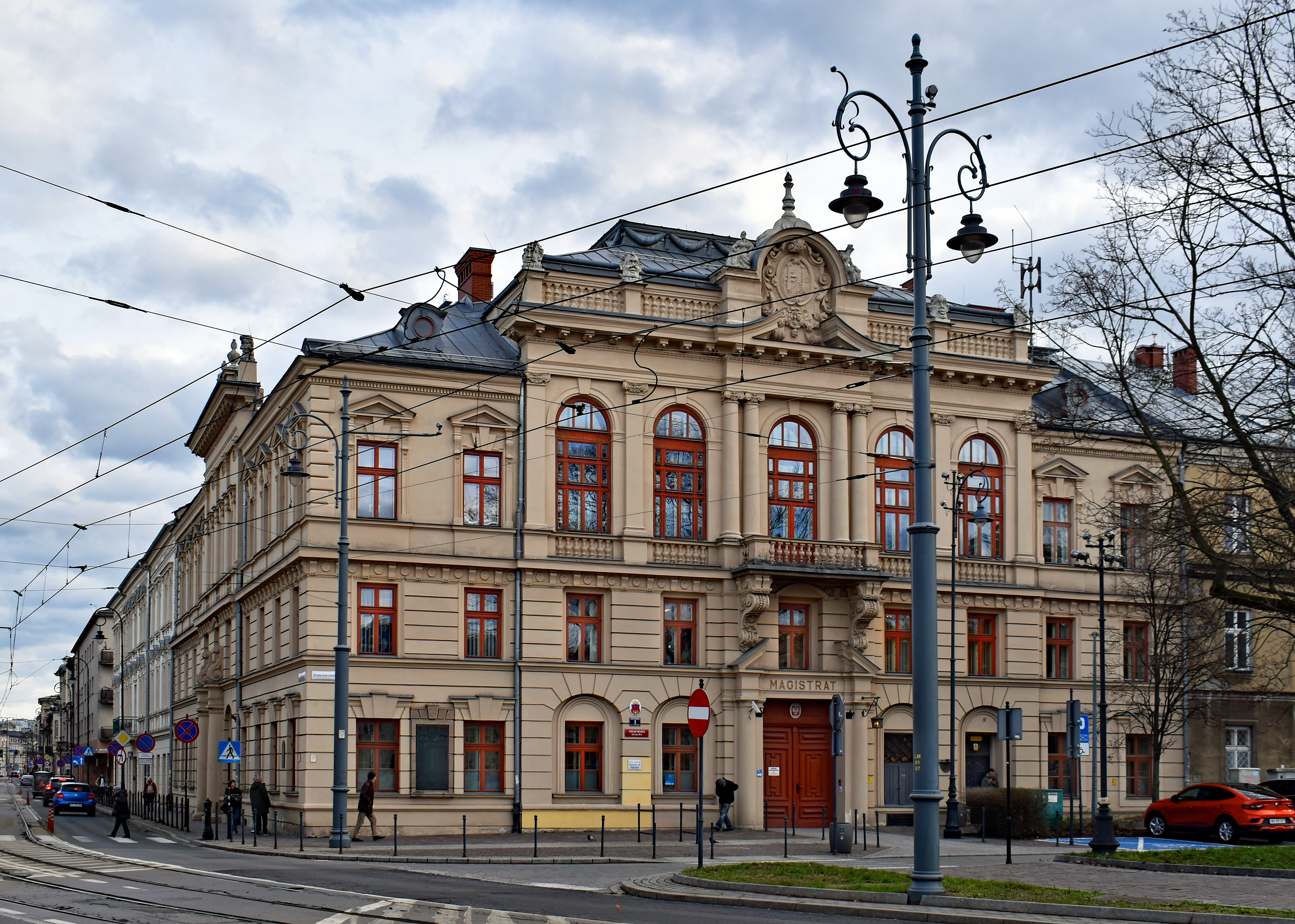
Podgórze City Hall (new and last)

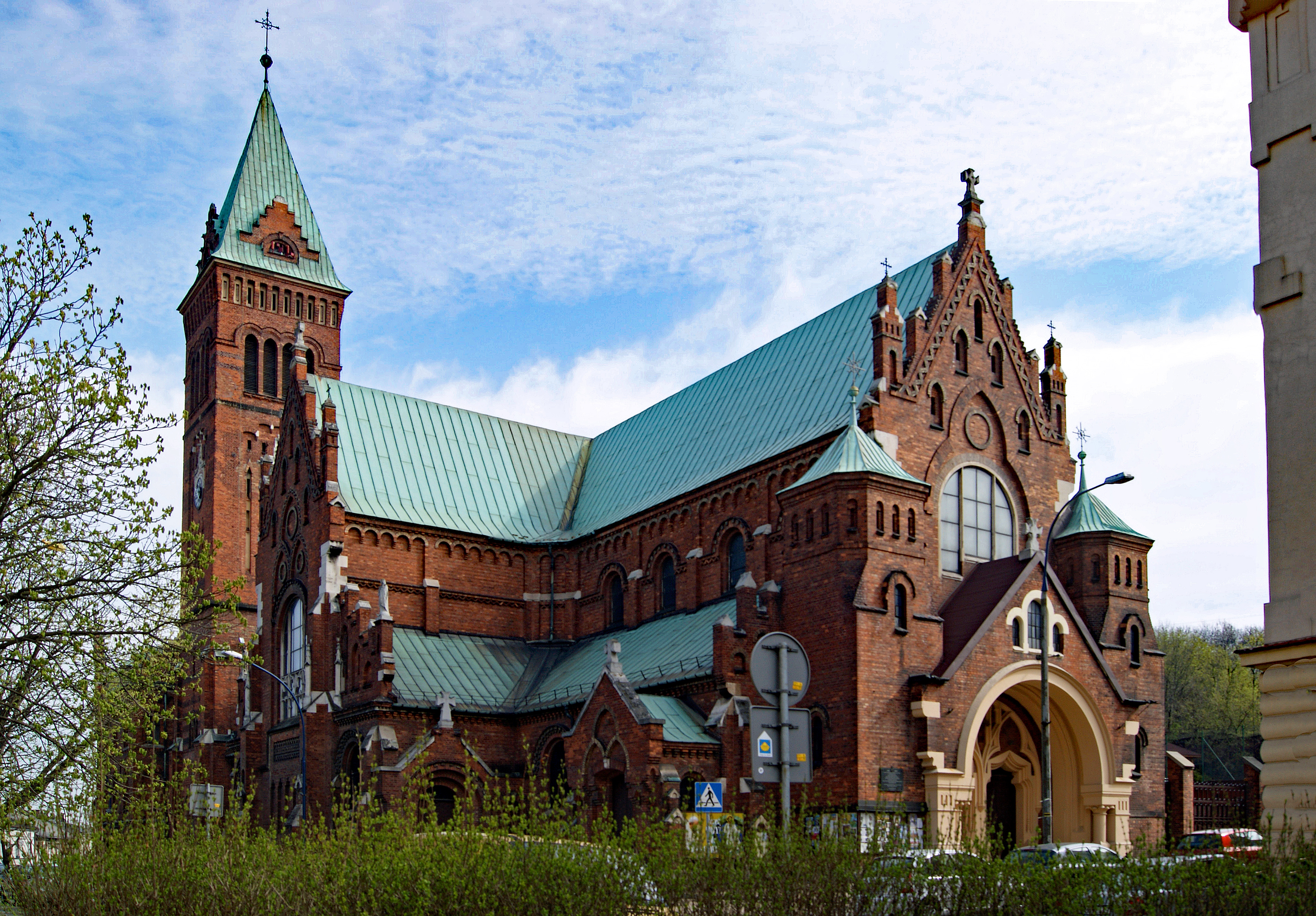
Church of Our Lady of Perpetual Help

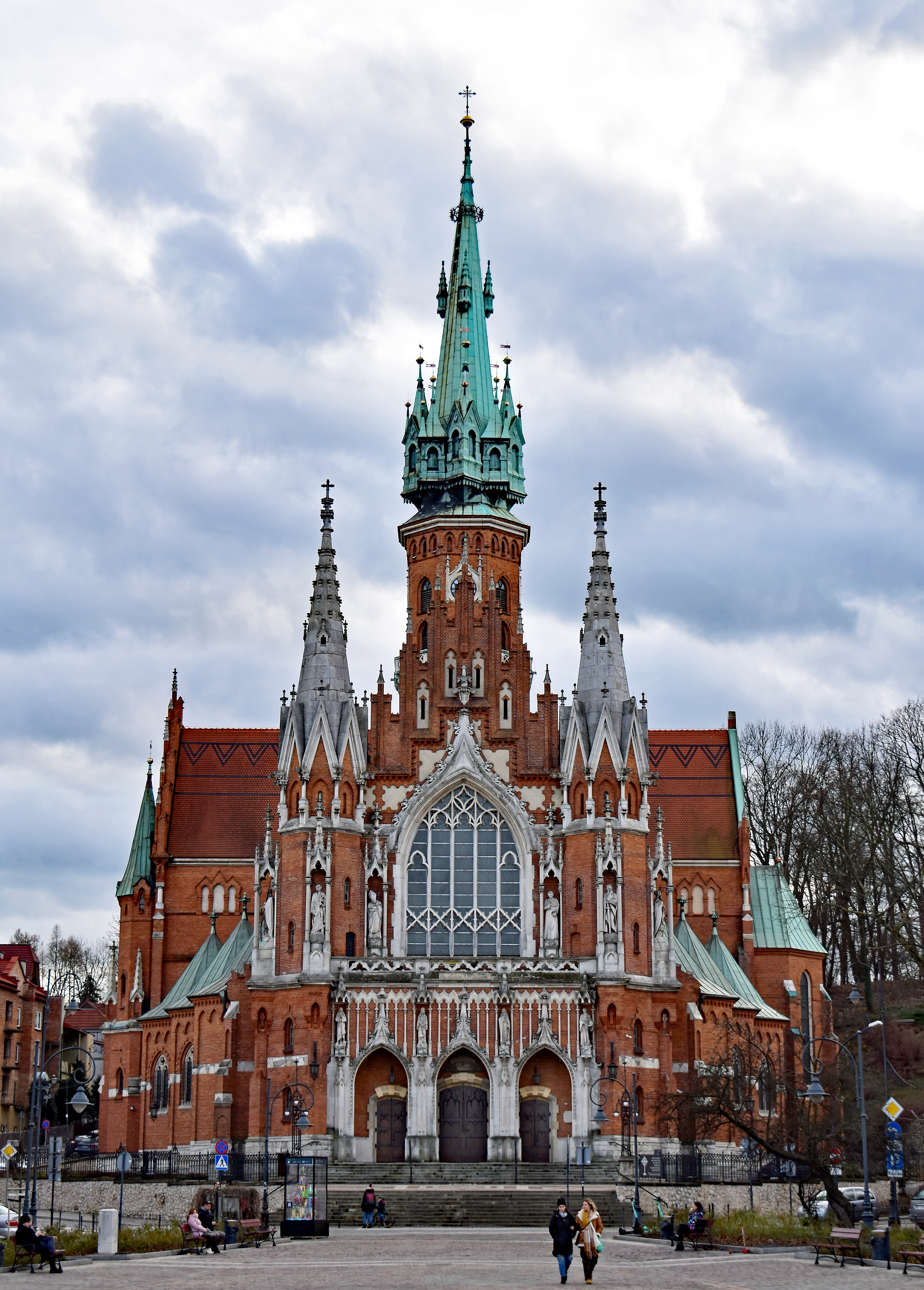
St. Joseph's Church

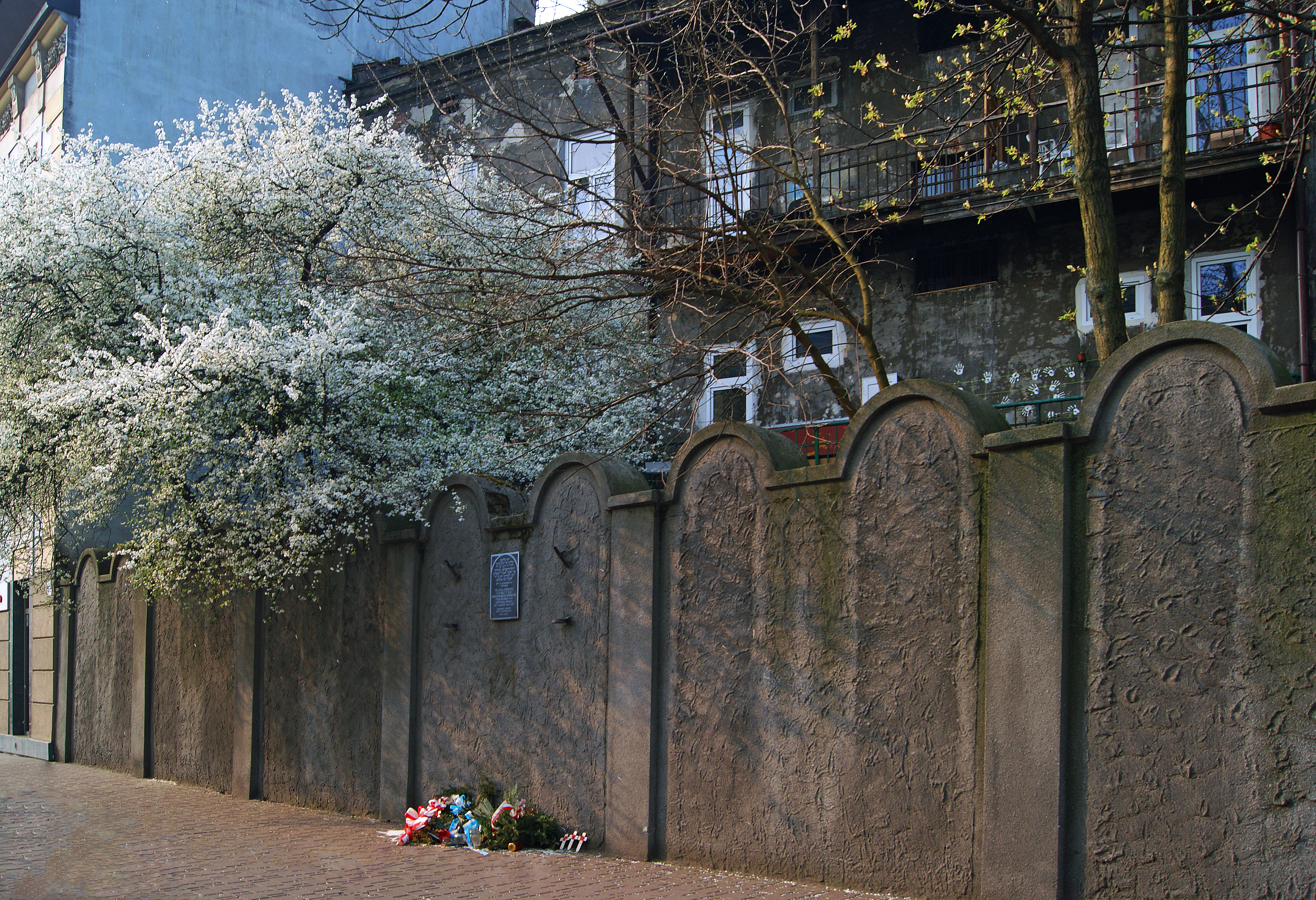
Preserved part of the ghetto wall

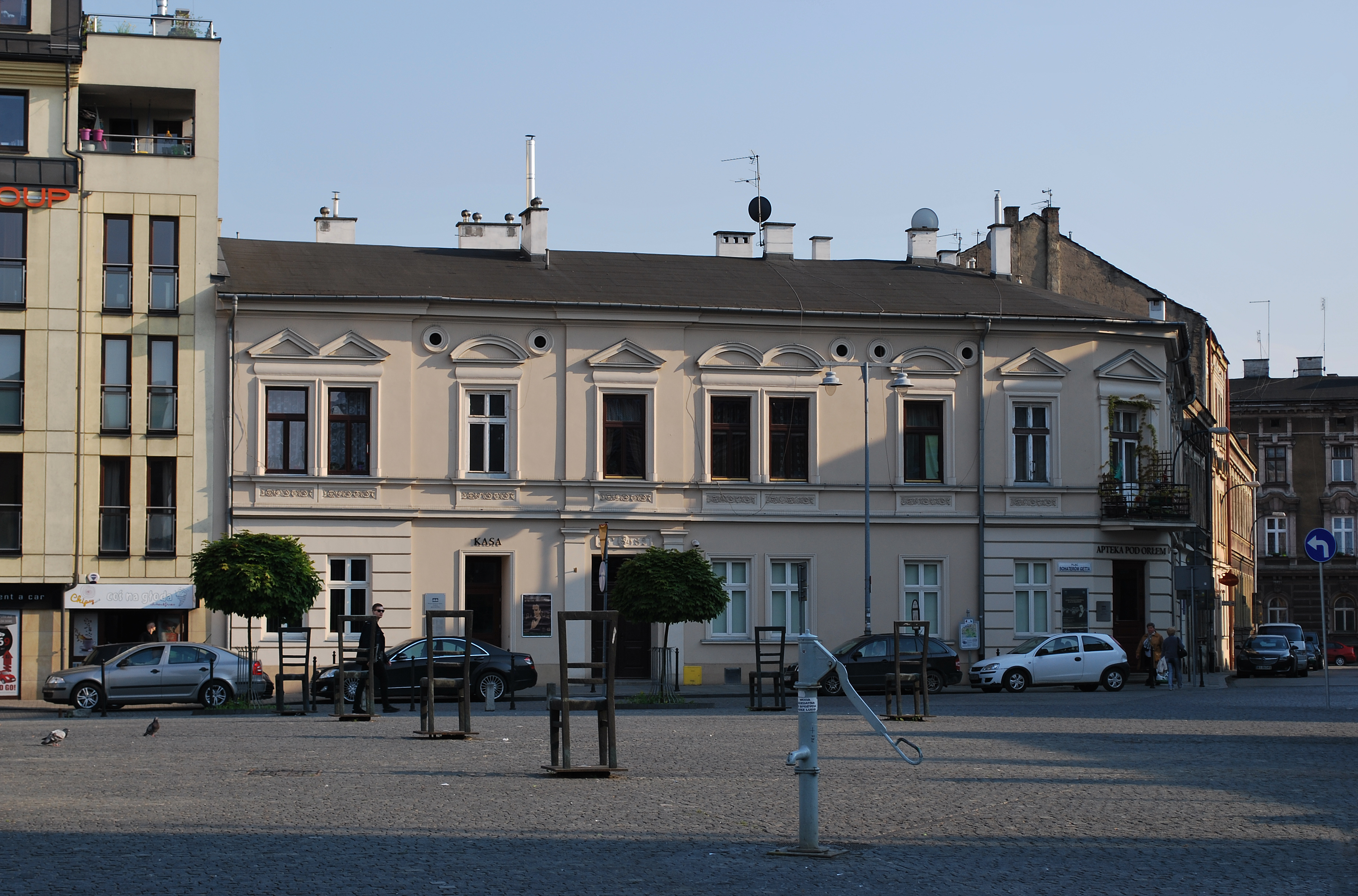
Eagle Pharmacy

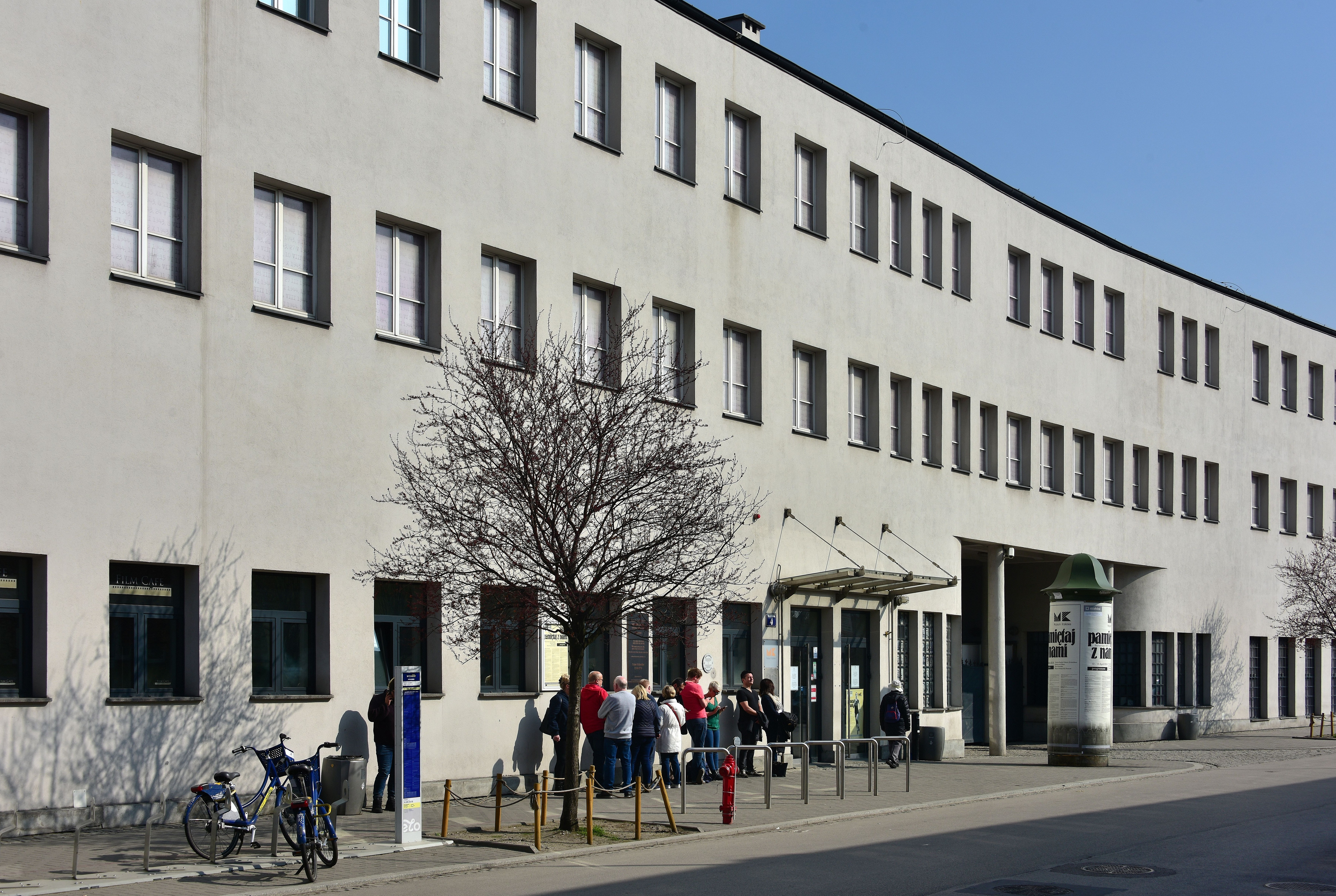
Oskar Schindler's Enamel Factory

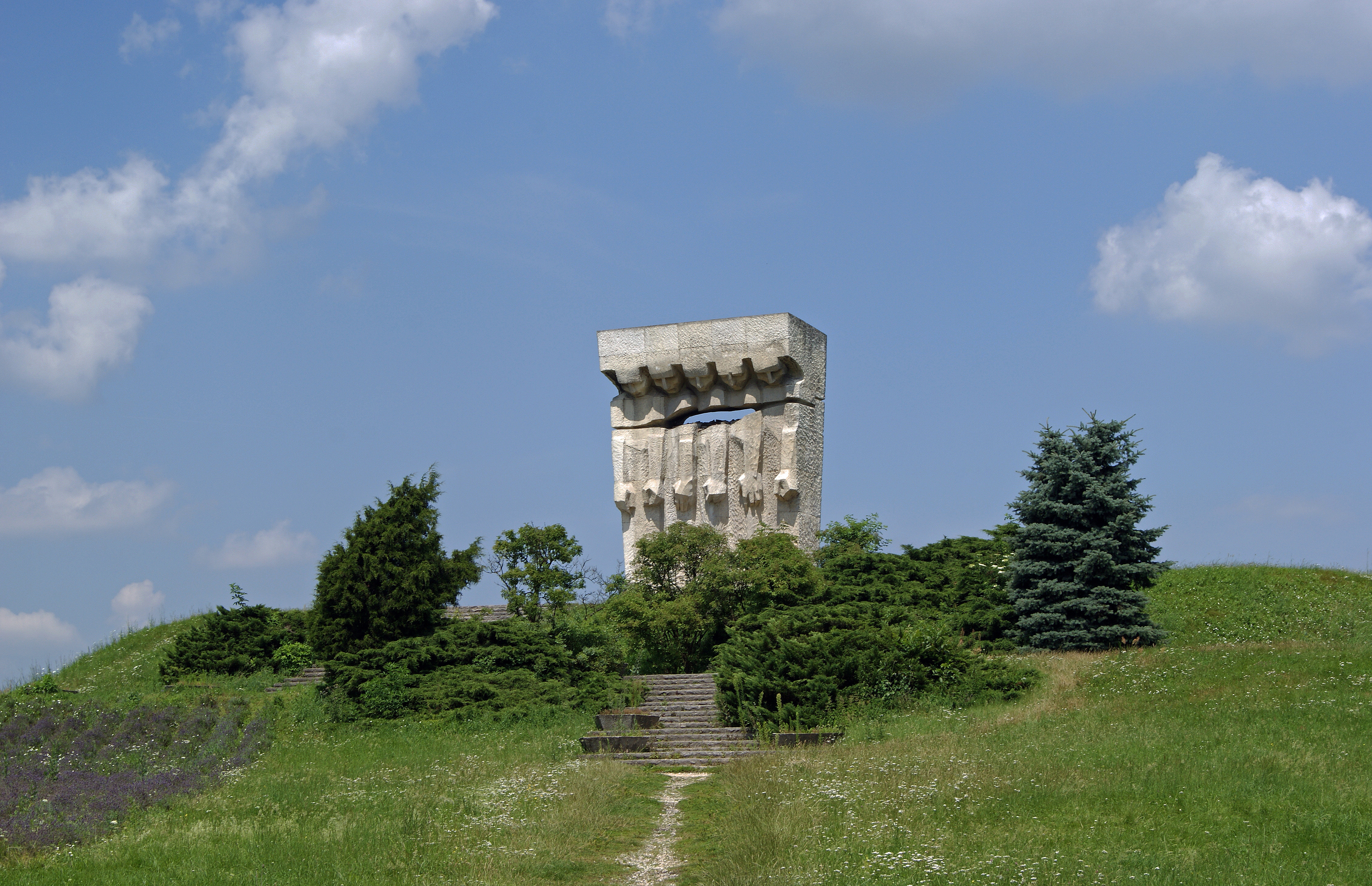
Kraków-Płaszów concentration camp memorial

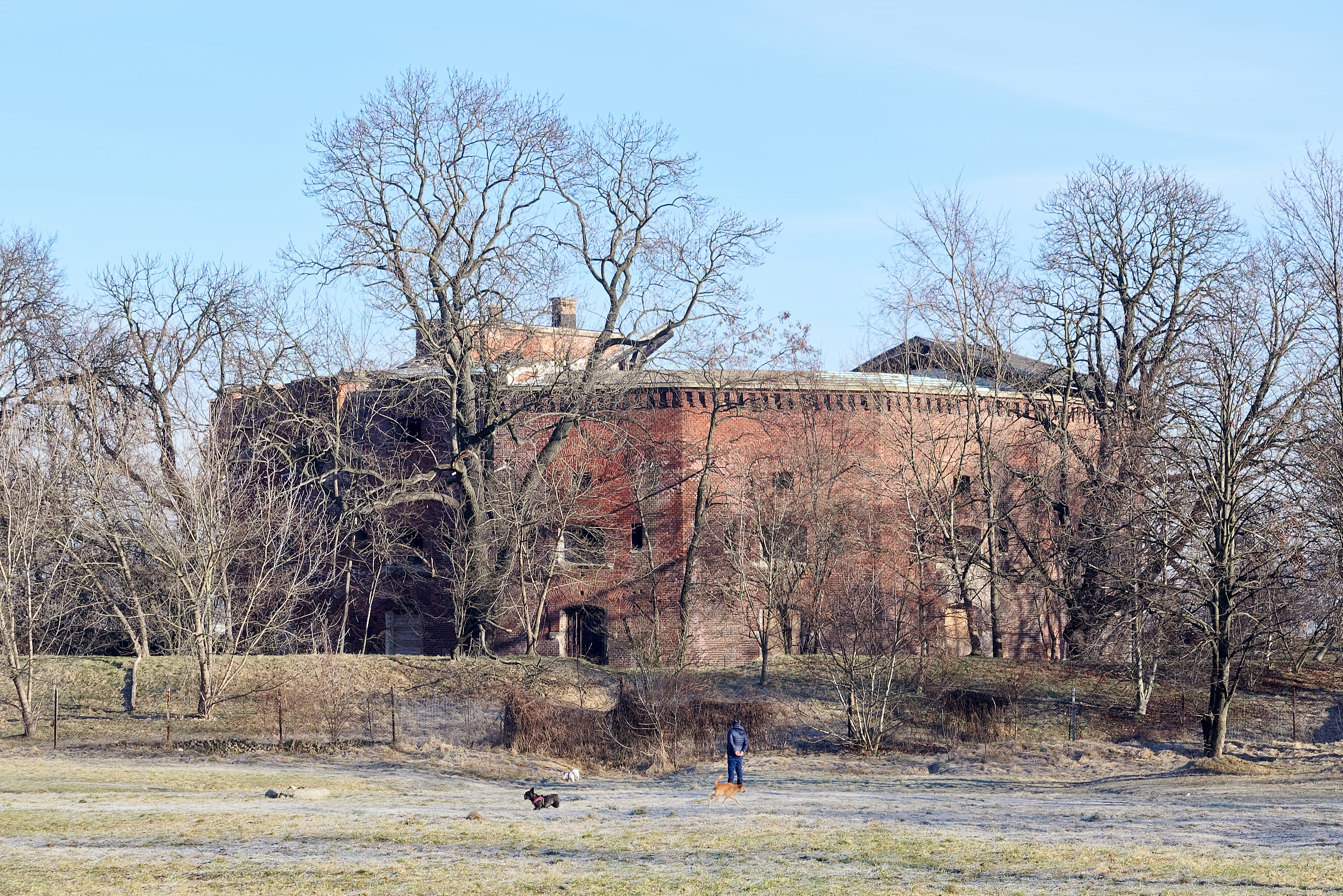
Kraków Fortress
Fort 31 "Benedykt"

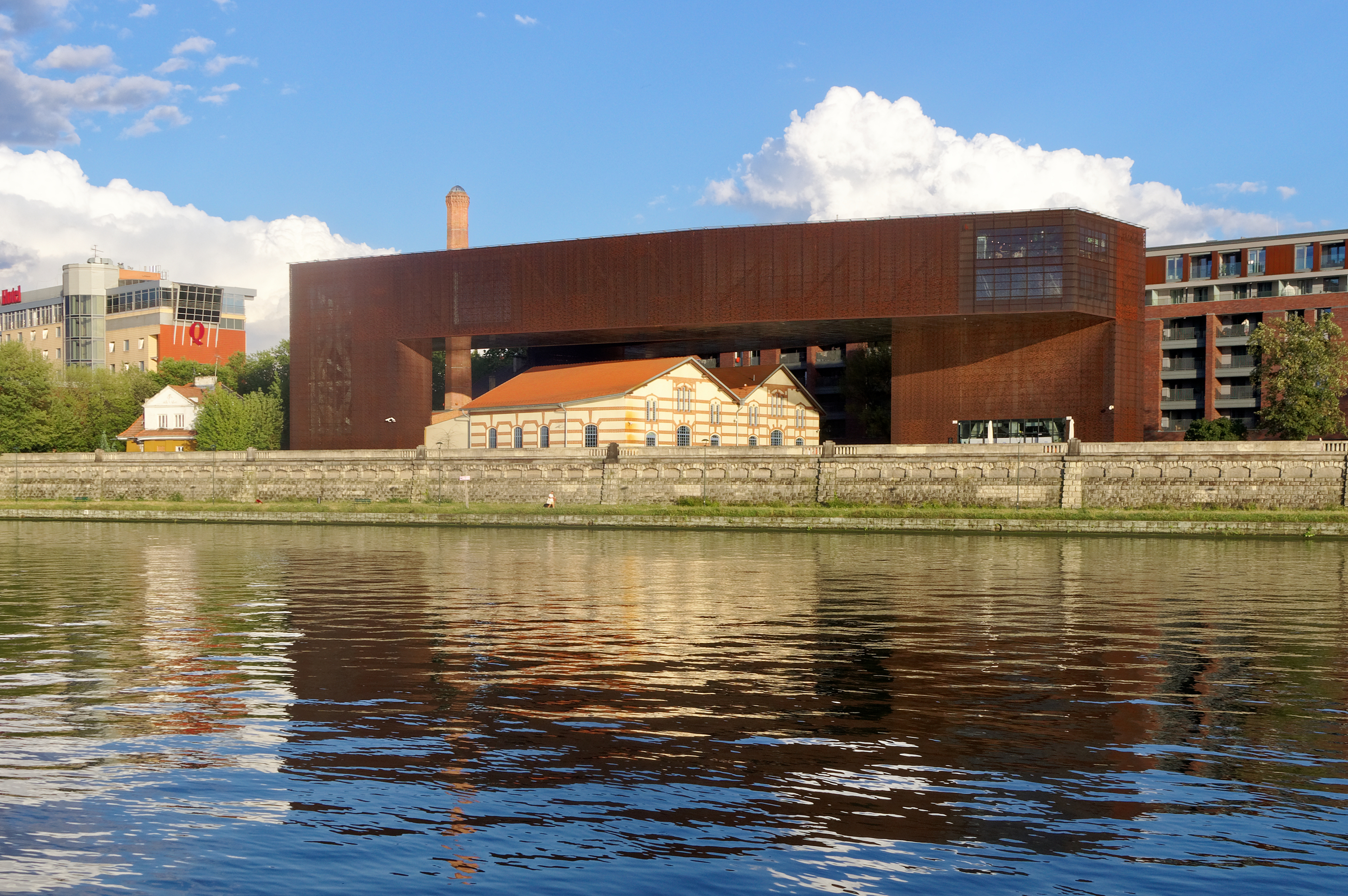
Cricoteka Centre for the Documentation of the Art of Tadeusz Kantor

== Notable people ==
- Edward Dembowski, Polish philosopher, journalist and independence activist, died here
- Arthur Dunkelblum, Jewish Belgian chess master, born here
- Salomon Bochner, Jewish American mathematician, born here
- Ignacy Friedmann (Freudmann), a Jewish pianist, composer, born here
- Józef Hofmann, born here
- Aleksander Kotsis, died here
- Bernard Offen, Holocaust survivor, author, lived here
- Poldek Pfefferberg, Holocaust survivor, taught at the Kościuszko Gymnasium as a professor
- Oskar Schindler, German businessman credited with saving the lives of 1,200 Jews in Poland
- Albin Francisco Schoepf, born here
- Mike Staner, Holocaust survivor, author, born here
- Roman Polanski, Polish film director, Holocaust survivor, lived here during World War II

== See also ==
- Krakus Mound
- Kraków Ghetto was located in the central part of Podgórze
  - Operation Reinhard in Kraków during the Holocaust in Poland
  - Large parts of the 1993 film Schindler's List were shot in nearby Kazimierz – not at the original places in Podgórze
  - Tadeusz Pankiewicz, Polish Righteous

== Bibliography ==
- (in Polish) * Praca zbiorowa Encyklopedia Krakowa, wydawca Biblioteka Kraków i Muzeum Krakowa, Kraków 2023, ISBN 978-83-66253-46-9 volume II pp 222-226 (Encyclopedia of Krakow)
