= Kaiserpanorama =

Stereoscopic entertainment medium

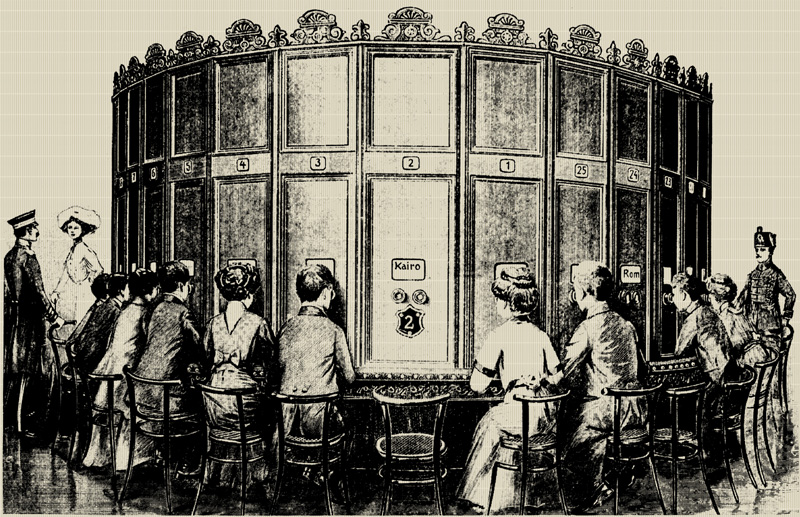
A drawing of a Kaiserpanorama with 25 viewing stations.

The Kaiserpanorama (or Kaiser-Panorama) is a form of stereoscopic entertainment medium used chiefly in the 19th and early 20th centuries, and is considered a precursor to film. It was invented by August Fuhrmann (1844–1925), and patented by him in c.1890. It consisted of a number of viewing stations from which people would peer through a pair of lenses to view a number of rotating stereoscopic glass slides. By 1910 Fuhrmann is said to have controlled exhibitions in over 250 branches across Europe, and to have held up to 100,000 slides in his central archive.

== Description ==
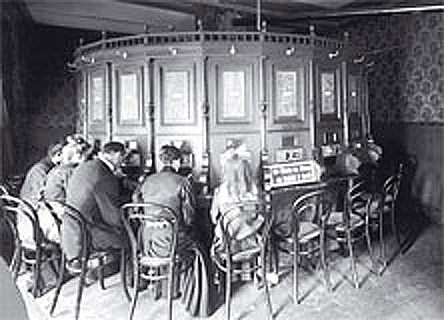
A kaiserpanorama in Prater (1900)

A kaiserpanorama would normally have around 25 wooden stations, each with a pair of viewing lenses. Inside the device there would be a rotating mechanism showing numerous stereoscopic images on rear-illuminated glass, giving a 3D effect.

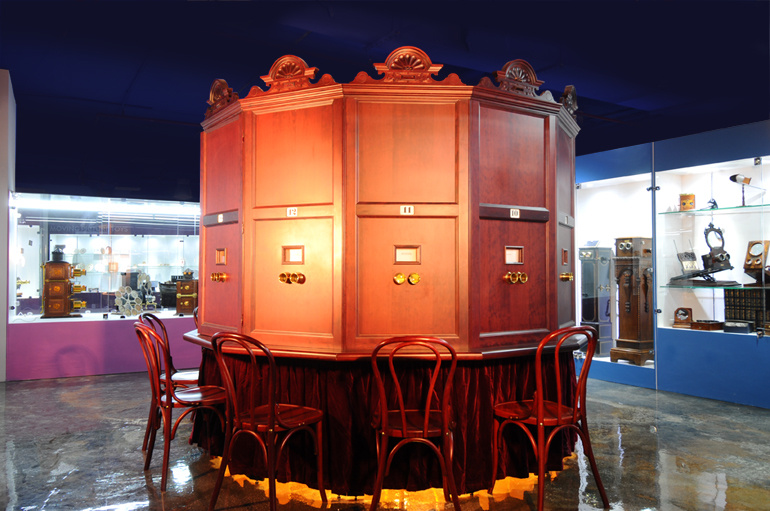
Kayserpanorama within the History of Cinema Museum.

== Reconstructions ==
Various modern reconstructions, as well as a few authentic remaining kaiserpanoramas, exist in the Munich Stadtmuseum, Wels, German Historical Museum, the Märkisches Museum (Berlin), Neugersdorf, Pioneer Settlement (Swan Hill, Australia), Muzeum Kinematografii (Łódź, Poland), Deutsches Technikmuseum (Berlin), the Düsseldorf Film Museum, the Teylers Museum (Haarlem, Holland) and the Fotomuseum Antwerp. Another example is the Warsaw Fotoplastikon, built in 1905, which, despite very similar design, is not under the name kaiserpanorama. During the German occupation, it was used by the Polish resistance as a meeting point. There was a dismantled kaiserpanorama in Snibston Discovery Museum in Coalville, Leicestershire, UK. The museum is closed, and the panorama is now in storage and under the care of Leicester City Council.

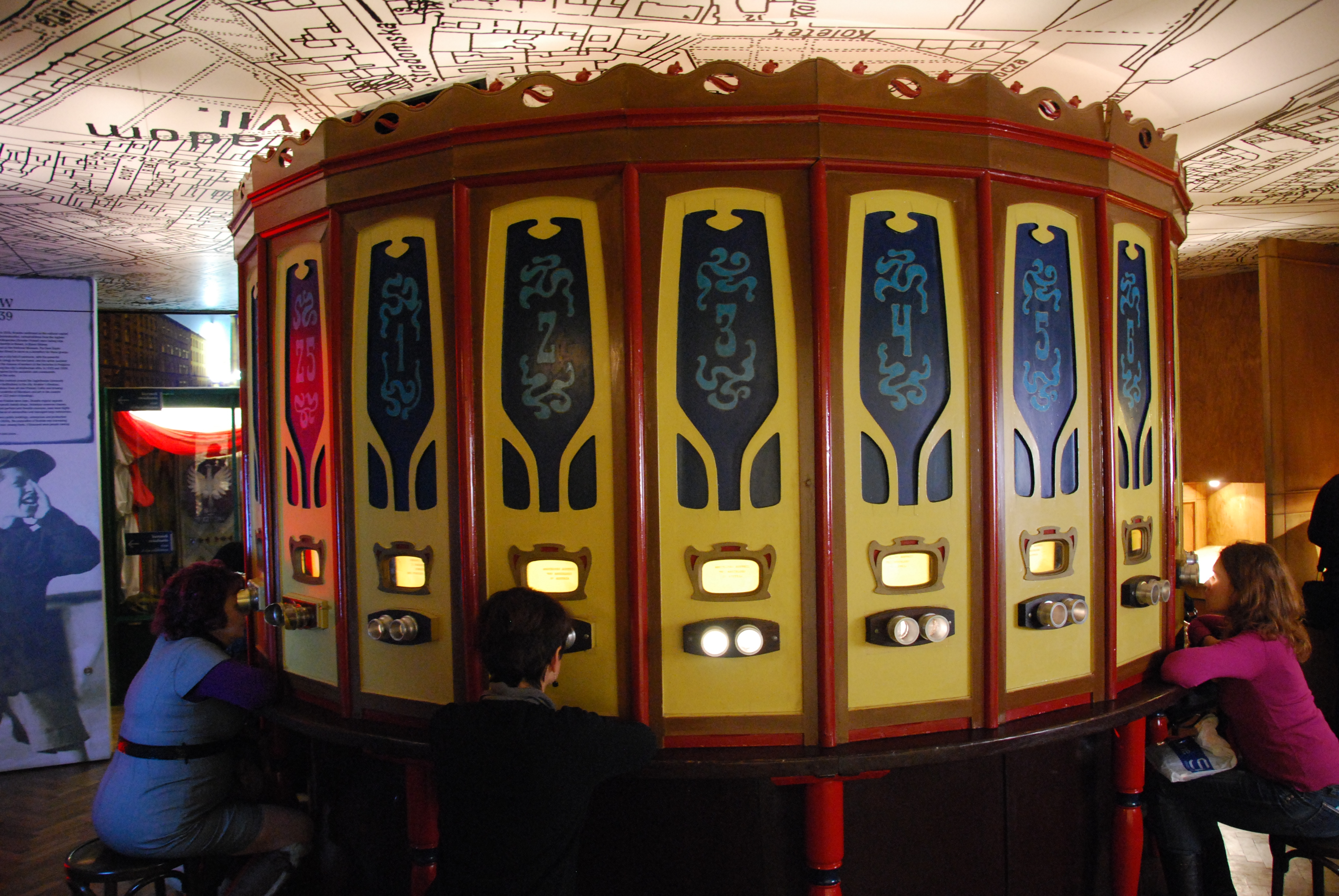
Fotoplastikon at the Oskar Schindler's Enamel Factory.

The museum of the occupation at the Oskar Schindler's Enamel Factory in Kraków, Poland, uses a fotoplastikon to show historical pictures.
