= Warsaw Fotoplastikon =

Kaiserpanorama stereoscopic theatre in Warsaw

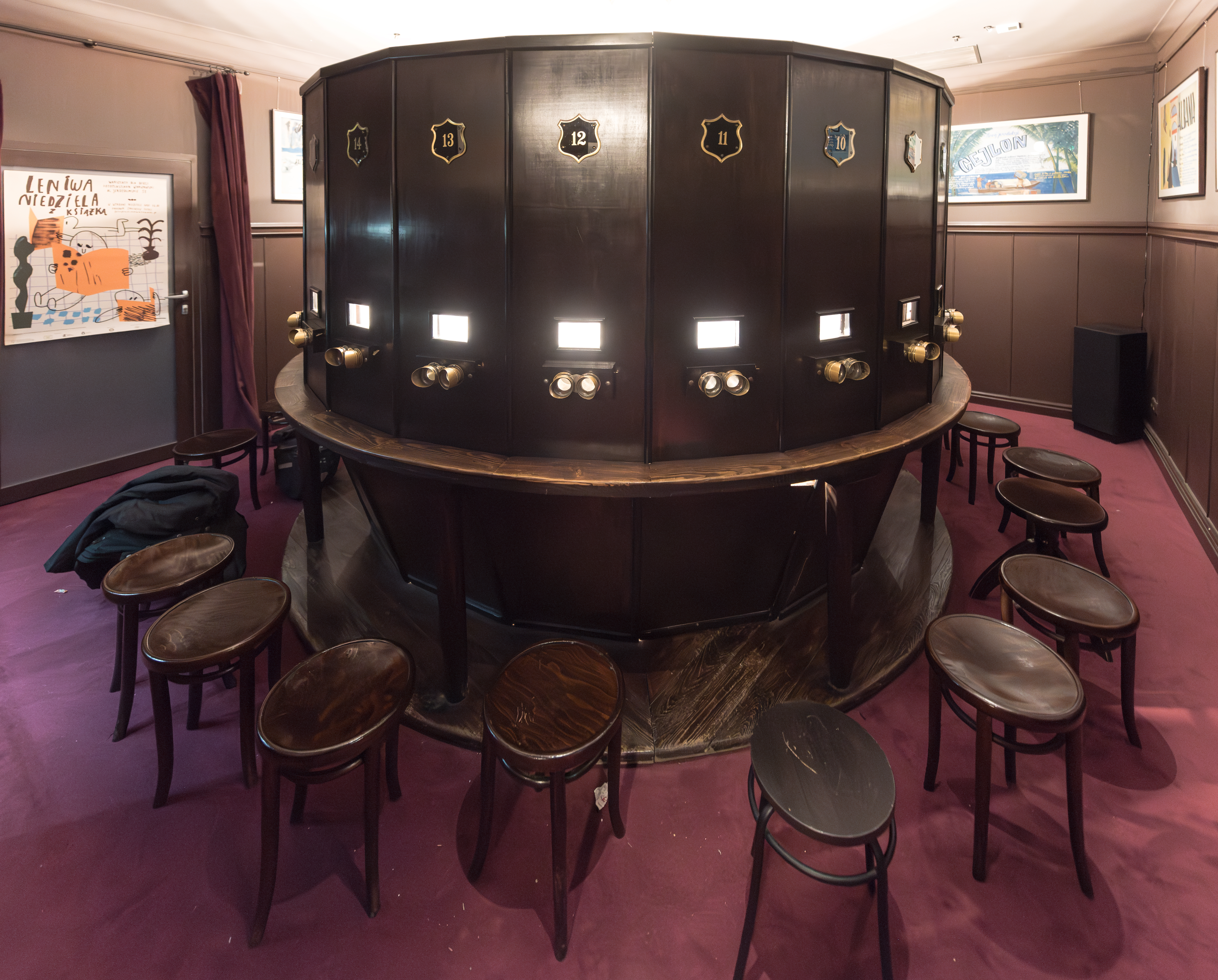
- Audience at Warsaw Fotoplastikon, 2025
- Interactive map of Warsaw Fotoplastikon
- Address: 51 Jerusalem Avenue; Warsaw; Poland
- Coordinates: 52.228818°N 21.008456°E
- Owner: Museum of the Warsaw Uprising
- Capacity: 24
- Type: Stereoscopic
- Designation: Polish Register of Monuments

Construction
- Opened: 1905(?)

Website
- http://fotoplastikonwarszawski.pl

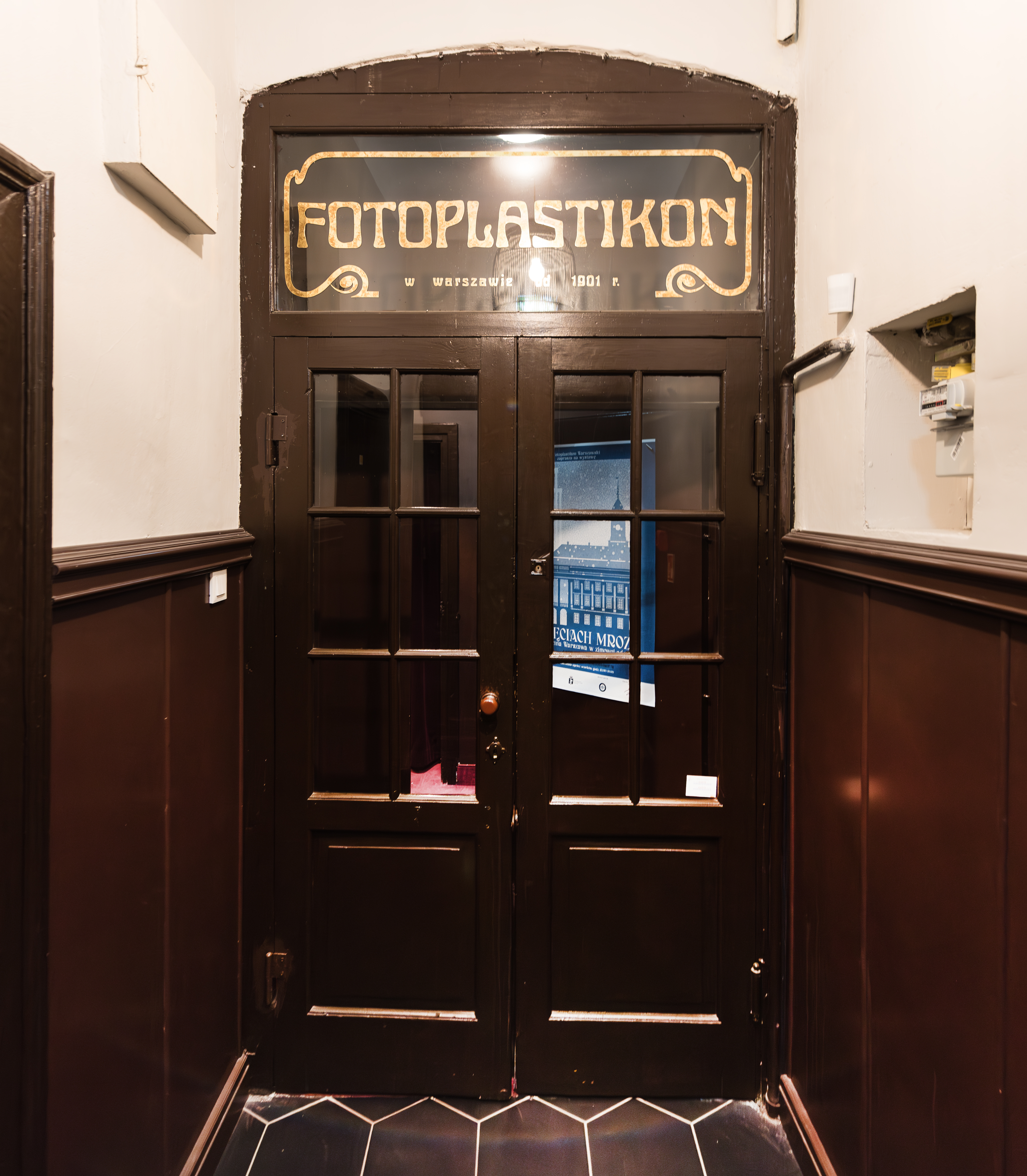
Entrance to Warsaw Fotoplastikon

The Warsaw Fotoplastikon is a stereoscopic theatre based on the Kaiserpanorama system of rotating stereoscopic images located in Warsaw, Poland. Operating at the same location since 1946, it is the oldest stereoscopic theatre in Europe still in business at its original location. Today it operates as a branch of the Museum of the Warsaw Uprising.

== Description ==
The Warsaw Fotoplastikon has 24 fixed stereoscopic viewports. A visitor sits at a viewport around the circumference of the machine. Each picture, from a sequence of 48 three dimensional stereo images, appears for 15 seconds before moving on to the next. Above each viewport is a window which displays an illuminated card with a brief description of the scene below. The scenes are arranged by themes, such as a travelogue to distant lands or depictions of historic events. Recorded music related to the theme plays in the background. The Fotoplastikon uses a slightly modified version of the Kaiserpanorama peepshow system, differing in having 24 viewports instead of 25 in the Kaiserpanorama system.

== History ==
The Warsaw Fotoplastikon was constructed in 1901. It was first shown at a temporary location but moved to its permanent location in a small theatre at the back of an inner courtyard of Kamienica Hoserów (Hoser Townhouse Apartment Building) at 51 Jerusalem Avenue at 1946.

The Warsaw Fotoplastikon is a Polish adaptation of the Kaiserpanorama peepshow technology invented in the 1890s which was popular across Europe before the growth of motion picture theatres. The Fotoplastikon has been operated at the 51 Jerusalem Avenue location since it opened, owned and run by a series of families more or less continuously since 1905, making it the oldest active in situ peepshow in Europe.

Soon after World War II, in October 1946, it was opened by the Krempa (or Krępa) family, who ran the theatre until 1973. In 1973 the new owner was Józef Chudy. After his death in 1980, the Fotoplastikon closed but was relaunched by Józef Chudy's grandson, Tomasz Chudy, in 1992. The Fotoplastikon was entered in the Polish Register of Monuments in 1987.

In 2008 Chudy leased the device, along with a collection of 3,000 slides, to the Museum of the Warsaw Uprising. In December 2012 the museum bought the equipment and has continued to operate it in the original location. In September 2013 Fotoplastikon gained an additional room, next to its original site adjacent to the Hoserow courtyard.

== Cultural influence ==
The Fotoplastikon served as a popular rendezvous point for many years, valued for its entertainment as well as providing a discrete location for couples to meet. In World War II, it was used by members of the Polish underground for clandestine meetings. The Kamienica Hoserów was one of the very few central Warsaw buildings not destroyed during World War II, allowing the Fotoplastikon to survive as a refuge from the horrors of the war and the hardship of the postwar communist era. It provided one of the few ways for Warsavians to view the outside world. The owners of the Fotoplastikon would loan their stereoscopic camera to Poles authorized to travel abroad and thus created new slide shows to supplement the Fotoplastikon's rare collection of original Kaiserpanorama historical travelogues. Imported jazz and pop records often served as the background music, providing an opportunity for Poles to enjoy western music during the communist era.

The Fotoplastikon has served as a period location for some Polish films, among them Polish Roads and This Honor. The Fotoplastikon served as an important setting in the 2013 graphic novel The Property by Israeli author and illustrator Rutu Modan. Several special performances have been held using live musicians playing inside the Fotoplastikon to accompany the stereo images as well as special evening shows of period erotic images of scientific curiosities.

== Bibliography ==
- John Brykczyński, Warsaw Townhouses and their inhabitants, History Meeting House, Warsaw, pp. 8–18, "Jerozolimskie 51"
- Agnieska Skórska-Jarmusz, "Magic Barrel", Warsaw Courier, pp. 33–35, June/July 2012
