= No Strings Attached (Meat Puppets album) =

Compilation album by Meat Puppets
- Released: November 1990
- Genre: Alternative rock
- Length: 1:13:40
- Label: SST (265)

Meat Puppets chronology
Monsters (1989)	No Strings Attached (1990)	Forbidden Places (1991)

No Strings Attached is the debut compilation album by American rock band Meat Puppets, released in November 1990, by SST Records.

== Background ==
It was released after the band left SST Records to join London Records. The compilation includes songs from their debut album up to Monsters (1989). The Meat Puppets had no involvement in this release.

Professional ratings
Review scores
Source	Rating
Allmusic	link
Robert Christgau	A

== Track listing ==
All songs written by Curt Kirkwood, unless otherwise noted.

1. "Big House" (Meat Puppets) - 1:04
2. "In a Car" (Meat Puppets) - 1:19
3. "Tumblin' Tumbleweeds" (Bob Nolan) - 2:02
4. "Reward" (Curt Kirkwood, Derrick Bostrom) - 1:08
5. "The Whistling Song" - 2:56
6. "New Gods" - 2:10
7. "Lost" - 3:25
8. "Lake of Fire" - 1:55
9. "Split Myself in Two" - 2:22
10. "Up on the Sun" - 4:01
11. "Swimming Ground" - 3:04
12. "Maiden's Milk" (Curt Kirkwood, Cris Kirkwood) - 3:16
13. "Bucket Head" - 2:20
14. "Out My Way" (Meat Puppets) - 4:49
15. "Confusion Fog" - 3:48
16. "I Am a Machine" - 4:21
17. "Quit It" - 2:35
18. "Beauty" - 2:59
19. "Look at the Rain" - 4:19
20. "I Can't Be Counted On" (Curt Kirkwood, Cris Kirkwood) - 3:58
21. "Automatic Mojo" (Curt Kirkwood, Cris Kirkwood) - 3:20
22. "Meltdown" - 3:06
23. "Like Being Alive" - 4:42
24. "Attacked by Monsters" - 4:41

=== Song origins ===
- Tracks 1 and 2 are from the In a Car EP.
- Tracks 3 and 4 are from Meat Puppets.
- Tracks 5–9 are from Meat Puppets II.
- Tracks 10–13 are from Up on the Sun.
- Track 14 is from the Out My Way EP.
- Tracks 15–18 are from Mirage.
- Tracks 19–21 are from Huevos.
- Tracks 22–24 are from Monsters.
