= Alive in the Nineties =

- DVD cover
- Distributed by: Cornerstone RAS
- Release date: 2003
- Country: United States
- Language: English

Alive in the Nineties is the first video released by the American rock group the Meat Puppets. The video was released in 2003 while the band was on hiatus. The video is professionally shot and was recorded while the band was touring with the Stone Temple Pilots.

== DVD features ==
- Available Audio Tracks: English (Dolby Digital 5.1), English (Dolby Digital 2.0 Stereo)
- Exclusive Curt Kirkwood Videowave interview
- Derrick Bostrom's anecdotes
- The Big Bottom Summit with Mike Watt, Flea, and Cris Kirkwood
- Testimonials from Watt and Sonic Youth's Thurston Moore
- A Puppets slideshow
- As seen on TV music video
- "Good Golly Miss Molly" from Aksarben, Omaha, Nebraska

== Track listing ==
1. "Attacked by Monsters"
2. "Backwater"
3. "Never to Be Found"
4. "Station"
5. "Coming Down"
6. "Violet Eyes"
7. "Wonderful Song"
8. "Plateau"
9. "Sam"
10. "Automatic Mojo"
11. "Lake of Fire"
12. "Six Gallon Pie"
13. "Popskull"
