= Up on the Sun =

Studio album by Meat Puppets
- Released: March 21, 1985
- Recorded: January 26–28, 1985
- Studios: Total Access, Redondo Beach, California
- Genres: Post-punk; psychedelia
- Length: 33:41
- Label: SST Records
- Producer: Spot

Meat Puppets chronology
Meat Puppets II (1984)	Up on the Sun (1985)	Out My Way (1986)

Singles from Up on the Sun
- 1. "Swimming Ground" Released: 1986

Up on the Sun is the third studio album by American rock band Meat Puppets, released on March 21, 1985, by SST Records. Rykodisc re-issued the album in 1999.

The album features cleaner mixing, more technical guitar and bass riffs, and the style overall is oriented toward psychedelic rock, in contrast to the sloppy punk approach of their debut album, while continuing with the mystical, poetic lyrics and country-inflected songwriting of Meat Puppets II (1984).

Up on the Sun is considered by listeners and fans as one of the best Meat Puppets albums.

== Background and recording ==
Brothers Curt and Cris Kirkwood were interested in psychedelic rock. The pair often indulged in recreational drug use with Derrick Bostrom, who came from an affluent, politically liberal family in Arizona and who introduced them to punk rock. During a trip to Los Angeles, the group became interested in the underground post-punk scene there. Joe Carducci invited the group to join SST Records, a record label associated with the early hardcore punk scene and home to Black Flag. The Meat Puppets' first EP In a Car (1981) and first seven albums appeared through SST.

The release of Meat Puppets II was delayed until 1984, a peak year for SST which also saw the release of Hüsker Dü's Zen Arcade, Minutemen's Double Nickels on the Dime, and numerous albums by Black Flag, who due to legal issues, had not been able to release an album since 1981's Damaged. The Meat Puppets supported Meat Puppets II with a tour along with Black Flag and The Nig-Heist, where the band's long hair and jam band approach displeased audiences.

According to Bostrom, the band had originally intended Up On the Sun to be a "psychedelic epic," and for it to be recorded using an 8-track tape recorder from a local music store with a do-it-yourself approach (citing distractions and delays that hindered the recording process of the band's previous releases). During this time, the band polished the arrangements and refined their approach to recording. Bostrom said they attempted to keep the basic arrangements simple, adding "spacy" overdubs later. To the band's misfortune, the 8-track recorder they had been using had a proprietary configuration, and they were unable to find another machine capable of playing the tracks they had recorded after they had returned the 8-track player to the music store, which forced them to start from scratch. They decided to abandon the psychedelic approach, and repurposed the songs for a power trio format, which "could be easily and quickly recorded." The songs that eventually wound up on Up On the Sun are drastically different from how they appeared on the 8-track demos.

The band ultimately decided to return to Total Access Studios in Redondo Beach, California to record the album "more prepared than [they] had ever been", with production by SST's house engineer Spot. They recorded from January 26 to 28, 1985, and SST released the album that March. The lyrics were printed with the liner notes, unbroken into the songs' stanzas. Curt Kirkwood used a Rockman amplifier to produce a clean guitar sound.

== Music and lyrics ==
While Meat Puppets (1981) featured fast-paced thrashcore mixed with psychedelic rock and country-laden with guitar feedback and Curt's screamed vocals, the group soon tired of hardcore. Meat Puppets II featured a slower and more emotional musical approach, incorporating psychedelic guitar effects and mystical, poetic lyrics penned by Curt. Spin described the sound of Up On the Sun as "complicated, at first inaccessible, hazy from sitting too long in the sun." Musically, the album departed slightly from the country-influenced sound of its immediate predecessor, being more based in what Mark Deming described as "sunburned psychedelia". Jon Dolan called the record an "insanely idyllic" work of "post-punk pastoralism". The album has been described as "trippy." AllMusic said that with the album, Meat Puppets "well and truly came out of the musical closet -- not only weren't they punks, they could easily pass for hippies and didn't feel the least bit self-conscious about it."

The group members have been open about their fondness for recreational drug use, in particular of LSD, and though the lyrics make no direct references to drugs, Curt Kirkwood has called Up on the Sun the group's "beer and pot" album. A psychedelic approach permeates the music and lyrics.

Curt had recently become the father of twins and the theme of fatherhood recurs in the lyrics, as in lines such as "You are my daughter" in the lead track. The lyrics to "Swimming Ground" are more realistic and idyllic than the psychedelic fantasies that precede it; the escape is toward the local swimming ground on hot summer days and the clouds overhead fail to let loose the rain. The scene recalls the desert summers of the Kirkwoods' Arizona youth. "Enchanted Pork Fist" is a mostly instrumental track with nonsense lyrics; the opening line "pistachios turn your fingers red" refers to the red with which manufacturers often dye the shells of commercial pistachios. Matthew Smith-Lahrman interprets this line as suggesting the lasting effects of a drug on the singer. Curt uses flowing water in "Two Rivers" as a metaphor for different aspects of life, such as relationships and the life's ever-changingness, and how different waters—and aspects of life—constantly flow into each other. The album closes with "Creator", in which Curt takes a cynical view of religion: "some say openly 'I don't know' / others build elevators / to take the chosen few / who can afford the scenic view".

== Artwork ==
Curt Kirkwood created the painting for the album's cover – a mug with a picture of a marijuana plant on it.

== Reception and legacy ==
Professional ratings
Review scores
Source	Rating
AllMusic	4.5/5 stars
Entertainment Weekly	A−
Mojo	5/5 stars
Spin Alternative Record Guide	9/10
Uncut	5/5 stars
The Village Voice	B+

To reviewer Fayette Hickox the Meat Puppets "deserve a legion" like the Deadheads—the faithful Grateful Dead fans—and the album "incorporate[s] ... seeming contradictions The band's hardcore past rattles beneath the surface of an almost folksy ingenuousness." In his Consumer Guide in The Village Voice Robert Christgau gave the album a B+ and wrote, "Curt Kirkwood is the David Thomas of endearing sloppiness. ... Curt's guitars not so much chim[e] as chatter in a nonchalantly unstylish take on neofolk lyricism. ... the music's charms are a little too flaccid to hold up the most unabashedly lysergic worldview yet to emerge from postpunk". Gregg Turner in a review in Creem denigrated Curt's vocals as "like a sick dog begging for food" and the production for failing to capture the quality of the band's live sound. He judged the material was "not all that riveting". A People review called Curt's guitarwork "strikingly inventive and mellifluous" while finding his vocals and the production unimpressive and found the band an acquired taste.

The band toured in support of the album throughout most of 1985, after which they followed up with a six-track EP titled Out My Way in 1986.

Suzanne McElfresh gave the 1999 rerelease a positive review, calling it "more fully realized" than Meat Puppets II. Mark Deming at AllMusic wrote: "The album has an air of carefree drift, but it doesn't meander, and the performances are remarkably tight, full of energy and purpose even when the songs are redolent of goofing off. ... the band rarely sounded as joyous or played with the same fire and accuracy as they demonstrated here, and it's arguably their most purely pleasurable work", though he considered "it lacks a song as memorable as 'Lake of Fire'".

The album was ranked No. 72 on Pitchfork's "Best Albums of the 1980s".

Birdsong Brewing named a beer "Up on the Sun Saison" after the Meat Puppets song. The Meat Puppets performed Up on the Sun in its entirety at the All Tomorrow's Parties festival that they curated in May 2011.

== Track listing ==
All tracks are written by Curt Kirkwood, except where noted.

Side one
No.	Title	Writer(s)	Length
1.	"Up on the Sun"		4:04
2.	"Maiden's Milk" (Instrumental)	Curt Kirkwood, Cris Kirkwood	3:19
3.	"Away"		3:25
4.	"Animal Kingdom"	Curt Kirkwood, Cris Kirkwood	1:25
5.	"Hot Pink"		3:27
6.	Untitled		3:04

Side two
No.	Title	Length
7.	"Buckethead"	2:22
8.	"Too Real"	2:13
9.	"Enchanted Porkfist"	2:31
10.	"Seal Whales" (Instrumental)	2:21
11.	"Two Rivers"	3:20
12.	"Creator"	2:10
Total length:		33:41

== Personnel ==
Meat Puppets

- Curt Kirkwood – guitar, vocals
- Cris Kirkwood – bass, vocals
- Derrick Bostrom – drums

Technical

- Spot – engineer
- Curt Kirkwood – cover artwork
- Derrick Bostrom – sleeve artwork
- Isaac Betesh – vinyl mastering at Greenhouse Audio
