= Mirage (Meat Puppets album) =

Studio album by Meat Puppets
- Released: April 1987
- Recorded: 1986–1987
- Studios: Chaton, Phoenix, Arizona
- Genres: Alternative rock; neo-psychedelia
- Length: 39:57 (original); 56:10 (reissue)
- Label: SST (100)
- Producers: Steven Escallier, Meat Puppets

Meat Puppets chronology
Out My Way (EP) (1986)	Mirage (1987)	Huevos (1987)

Singles from Mirage
- 1. "Get on Down" Released: 1987; 2. "I Am a Machine" Released: 1987

Mirage is the fourth studio album by the American rock band Meat Puppets, released in April 1987 by SST Records. Drummer Derrick Bostrom refers to the album as their "psychedelic epic".

The album was reissued in 1999 by Rykodisc with five additional bonus tracks, including early demos of "The Mighty Zero," "I Am a Machine" and "Liquified" as well as a cover of the Elvis Presley song "Rubberneckin'" and the previously unreleased "Grand Intro." As an added bonus, this album includes an "Enhanced CD" partition for play on home computers.

== Background and music ==
Chuck Eddy called the music of Mirage "a sideways brand of cactus-country rock", similar to the Meat Puppets' two preceding albums. "Liquified" has been described as "metal-ish" and compared to the band's early work, whereas "Confusion Fog" invited comparisons to Meat Puppets II (1984).

== Critical reception ==
Professional ratings
Review scores
Source	Rating
AllMusic	link
The Village Voice	C+ link

Chuck Eddy wrote in a June 1987 edition of Spin that Mirage was "catchier and more intricate" than Meat Puppets II and Up on the Sun.

== Track listing ==
All songs written by Curt Kirkwood, unless otherwise noted.

Original album

1. "Mirage" – 3:40
2. "Quit It" – 2:36
3. "Confusion Fog" – 3:49
4. "The Wind and the Rain" – 2:57
5. "The Mighty Zero" (Curt Kirkwood, Cris Kirkwood) – 3:18
6. "Get on Down" – 2:55
7. "Leaves" – 2:38
8. "I Am a Machine" – 4:21
9. "Beauty" – 3:02
10. "A Hundred Miles" – 3:34
11. "Love Our Children Forever" – 3:56
12. "Liquified" – 3:11

CD reissue bonus tracks

13. "The Mighty Zero" (Demo Version) (Curt Kirkwood, Cris Kirkwood) – 3:40
14. "I Am a Machine" (Demo Version) – 4:05
15. "Liquified" (Demo Version) – 3:39
16. "Rubberneckin'" (Dory Jones, Bunny Warren) – 2:46
17. "Grand Intro" – 2:03

== Personnel ==
- Curt Kirkwood – guitar, vocals, artwork, sleeve drawings
- Cris Kirkwood – bass, vocals
- Derrick Bostrom – drums, cover artwork
