= Shandon Sahm =

American drummer (born 1969)

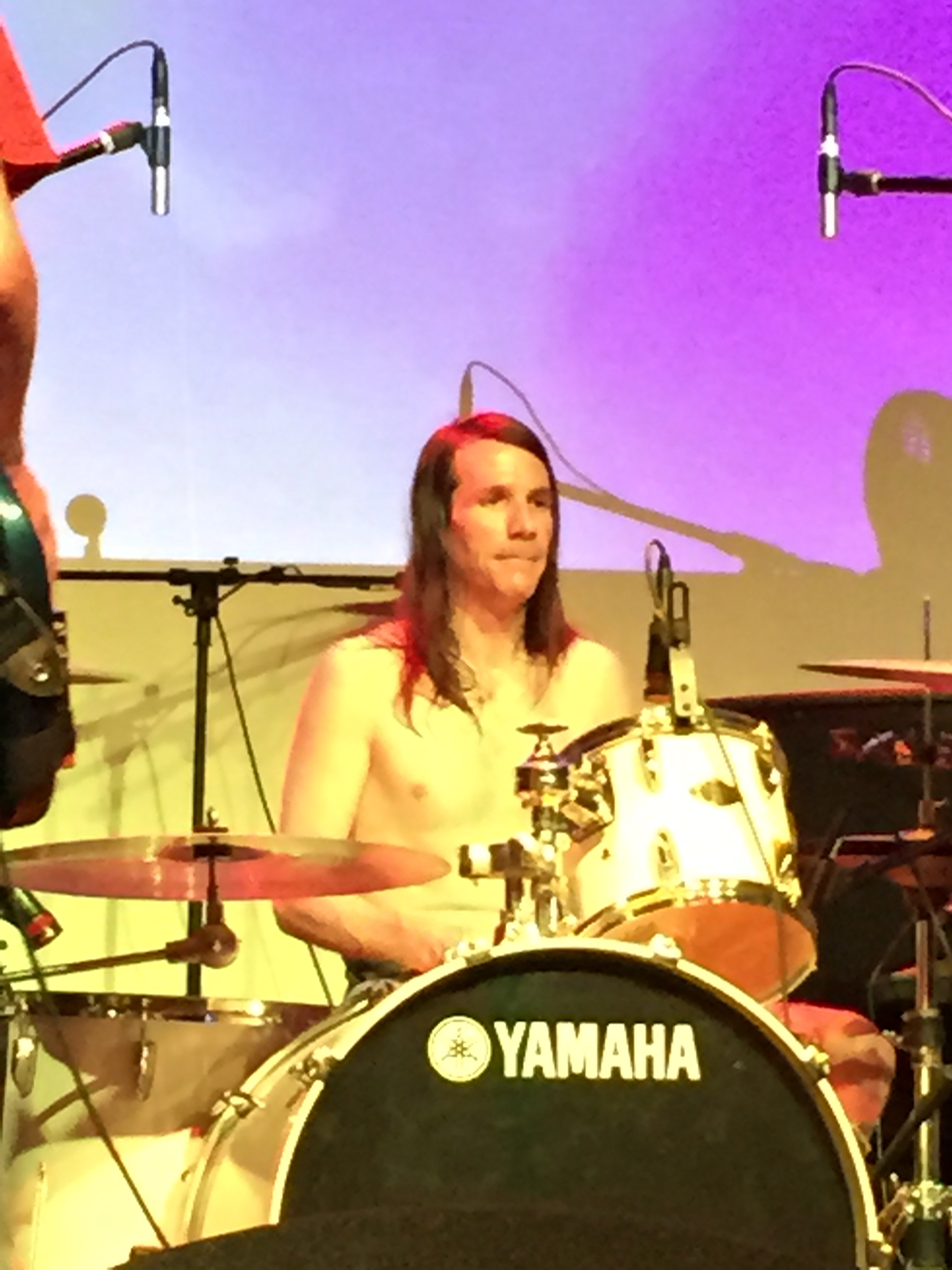
- Sahm in 2015

Background information
- Born: Shandon Victor Ray Sahm; May 7, 1969 (age 56); Salinas, California
- Genres: Alternative, punk rock, psychedelic rock, country, heavy metal
- Occupations: Musician, drummer, songwriter
- Instrument: Drums
- Years active: 1990–present

Shandon Sahm (born May 7, 1969) is an American drummer, who is a native of San Antonio, Texas and is best known for his two stints as the drummer of the Meat Puppets, from 1999–2002 and 2009–2018.

== Biography ==
Sahm is the son of Doug Sahm (who was the leader of such rock bands as the Sir Douglas Quintet and the Texas Tornados, among others). Sahm began playing drums at a young age after being inspired by his father's music and by Kiss, with his first appearance on record being Where the Pyramid Meets the Eye: A Tribute To Roky Erickson, in 1990. During the early 1990s, Sahm was drumming for the heavy metal band Pariah, who issued one album for Geffen Records, To Mock a Killingbird, in 1993.

After Pariah split up, Sahm supplied drums on a Sir Douglas Quintet album, 1994's Day Dreaming at Midnight, before first crossing paths with Meat Puppets singer/guitarist Curt Kirkwood, who had relocated to Texas, and was looking to put a new band together (as the Meat Puppets were on hiatus at the time). Kirkwood enlisted Sahm and his ex-Pariah bandmate, guitarist Kyle Ellison, as well as ex-Bob Mould bassist Andrew Duplantis, to form the Royal Neanderthal Orchestra. Eventually, the band adopted the familiar Meat Puppets moniker, and issued an EP in 1999, You Love Me (on which Sahm earned a co-songwriting credit with Kirkwood, for the tune "Been Caught Itchin'") and a studio album in 2000, Golden Lies (which saw Sahm earn another co-songwriting credit with Kirkwood, for the composition "Hercules").

Despite mounting a successful U.S. tour in support of Golden Lies, this version of the Meat Puppets splintered by 2002, but a live album from the tour, Meat Puppets Live, was issued that year. An unreleased Meat Puppets song that featured Sahm on drums ("New Leaf") was included on the 2004 compilation, Classic Puppets, and in 2009, Sahm supplied drums on the release Keep Your Soul: A Tribute to Doug Sahm (which featured contributions by Los Lobos, Alejandro Escovedo, Greg Dulli, Jimmie Vaughan, Dave Alvin, Joe "King" Carrasco, among others). Also in 2004, Sahm joined Butthole Surfers singer Gibby Haynes (in his band, Gibby Haynes and His Problem) for a U.S. tour and provided drums for a self-titled record by the band, which was released on Surfdog Records (and includes such songs as "Redneck Sex," "Charlie," "Dream Machine," "Kaiser," "Woo"). The band went on to perform a string of dates with Ween.

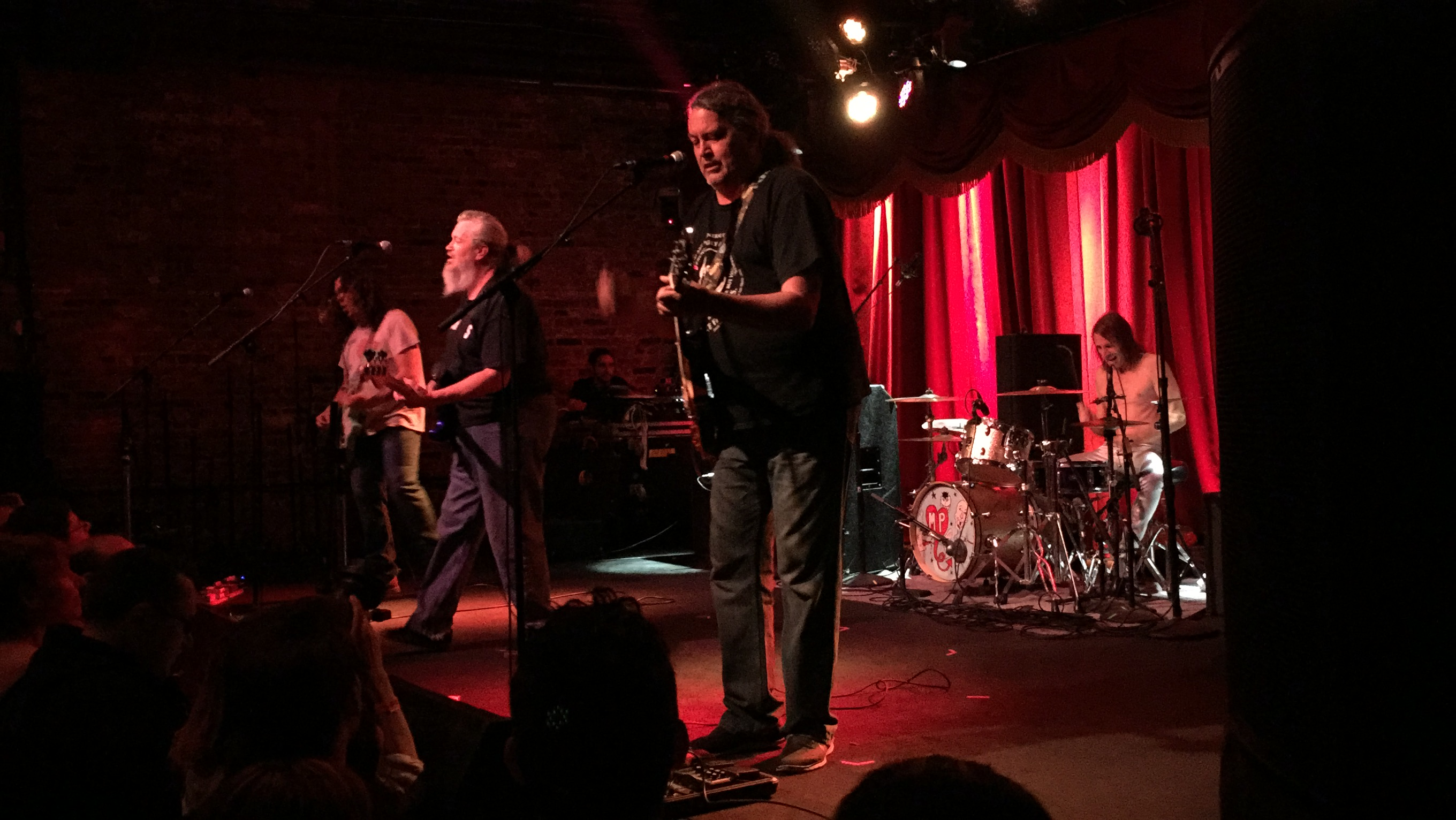
L-R: Elmo Kirkwood, Cris Kirkwood, Curt Kirkwood, and Shandon Sahm.

With Curt and Cris Kirkwood reconciling circa 2006, the Meat Puppets reunited, but without original drummer Derrick Bostrom. Ted Marcus would initially replace Bostrom on drums, before Sahm was invited to rejoin the band in 2009. Subsequently, Sahm has supplied drums on the albums Lollipop (in 2011) and Rat Farm (in 2013), was interviewed for the 2012 book, Too High to Die: Meet the Meat Puppets, and has toured the world with the band, including shows with Stone Temple Pilots, Sonic Youth, Butthole Surfers, Soundgarden, Mudhoney, Dave Grohl, Soul Asylum, Grant Hart, and Mike Watt.

Sahm has also performed with the Meat Puppets on The Late Late Show with Craig Kilborn and The Bing Lounge, has performed as part of a Kiss tribute band called SSIK (which features Dangerous Toys singer Jason McMaster), and has released two solo albums to date (2006's Good Thoughts Are Better Than Laxatives and 2011's Knock Yourself Out).

In July 2018, it was reported that Bostrom had rejoined the Meat Puppets, and replaced Sahm in the band. As of 2019, Sahm is based in the Netherlands, and an album of renditions of his father's material, entitled Sahm Covers Sahm, was released via Friendly Folk Records in February that year. Shandon was signed to Friendly Folk Records label from 2019-2021. In 2020, Sahm Covers Sahm Vol. 2 was released, which included such songs as "She's About a Mover", arranged and produced by Eric Van Den Brink (courtesy of Nick Vernier Band). Vol. 2 also contains contributions by members of the Meat Puppets and West Side Horns, and was co-produced by Shandon with Ralf and Almar Nijholt.

== Discography ==
- 1990 – Where the Pyramid Meets the Eye: A Tribute to Roky Erickson (Various Artists), Sire/London/Rhino Records
- 1993 – To Mock a Killingbird (Pariah), Geffen Records
- 1994 – Day Dreaming at Midnight (Sir Douglas Quintet), Elektra/Asylum Records
- 1999 – You Love Me (Meat Puppets), London Records
- 2000 – Golden Lies (Meat Puppets), Atlantic Records
- 2002 – Meat Puppets Live (Meat Puppets), DCN Records
- 2004 – Classic Puppets (Meat Puppets), Rhino Records
- 2004 – Gibby Haynes & His Problem (Gibby Haynes), Surfdog Records
- 2006 – Good Thoughts Are Better Than Laxatives (Shandon Sahm), Shandon Sahm Music
- 2009 – Keep Your Soul: A Tribute to Doug Sahm (Various Artists), Vanguard Records
- 2010 – Minnesota Beatle Project Vol. 2 (Meat Puppets with Alison Scott), Vega Productions
- 2011 – Newermind: SPIN Tribute to Nirvana's Nevermind (Meat Puppets), SPIN Magazine
- 2011 – Lollipop (Meat Puppets), Megaforce Records
- 2013 – Rat Farm (Meat Puppets), Megaforce Records
- 2019 – Sahm Covers Sahm (Shandon Sahm), Friendly Folk Records
- 2020 – Sahm Covers Sahm Vol. 2 (Shandon Sahm), Sahm Productions
