= Meat Puppets Live =

Live

Live album by Meat Puppets
- Released: April 9, 2002
- Recorded: February 8, 2001, at Maxwell's, Hoboken, NJ, and February 11, 2001, at Higher Ground, Winooski, VT
- Genre: Alternative rock
- Length: 75:44
- Label: DCN Digital Club Network
- Producer: Brad Navin, Usher Winslett

Meat Puppets chronology
Golden Lies (2000)	Live (2002)	Classic Puppets (2004)

Professional ratings
Review scores
Source	Rating
AllMusic	4/5 stars
The Encyclopedia of Popular Music	2/5 stars
Pitchfork Media	(2.7/10)

Live is a 2002 live album by American rock band Meat Puppets. It is also known as Live at Maxwell's. The album includes a previously unreleased song, "Way That It Are."

== Track listing ==
All songs by Curt Kirkwood unless otherwise noted.

1. "Intro" (Kirkwood, Kyle Ellison) – 4:35
2. "Armed and Stupid" – 3:01
3. "Wipe Out" – 3:39
4. "I Quit" – 3:01
5. "Hercules" (Kirkwood, Shandon Sahm) – 3:13
6. "Oh, Me" – 3:11
7. "Push the Button" – 4:35
8. "Lamp" – 5:36
9. "Pieces of Me" – 3:32
10. "Up on the Sun" – 7:21
11. "Take Off Your Clothes" (Kirkwood, Ellison) – 4:49
12. "Fatboy / Fat / Requiem" (Kirkwood, Ellison) – 9:41
13. "Lake of Fire" – 2:38
14. "Way That It Are" (Kirkwood, Ellison) – 4:08
15. "You Love Me" (Kirkwood, Ellison, Andrew Duplantis) – 3:51
16. "Plateau" – 2:47
17. "Touchdown King" – 6:02

== Personnel ==
Meat Puppets

- Curt Kirkwood – guitar, vocals, keyboards
- Kyle Ellison – backing vocals, guitar, keyboards
- Andrew Duplantis – backing vocals, bass, keyboards
- Shandon Sahm – drums

Production and other credits

- Executive producers – Brad Navin and Usher Winslett
- Editing and mastering – Alex Kokollo
- Project manager – Jessica Nathanson
- Sound engineer – David Claassen
- Album art – Elmo Kirkwood
- Band photo – Todd V. Wolfson
- Design – David Richman
- Liner Notes – Matt Houser
