= MTV Unplugged in New York =

1994 live album by Nirvana

Live album by Nirvana
- Released: November 1, 1994 (CD/CS) November 20, 2007 (DVD)
- Recorded: November 18, 1993
- Venues: Sony Music, New York City
- Genres: Alternative rock; acoustic rock; folk rock
- Length: 53:50 (CD/CS); 66:28 (DVD)
- Label: DGC
- Producers: Alex Coletti; Scott Litt; Nirvana

Nirvana chronology
In Utero (1993)	MTV Unplugged in New York (1994)	Singles (1995)

Nirvana video chronology
Classic Albums: Nirvana – Nevermind (2005)	MTV Unplugged in New York (2007)	Live at Reading (2009)

Singles from MTV Unplugged in New York
- 1. "About a Girl" Released: October 24, 1994

MTV Unplugged in New York is the first live album by the American rock band Nirvana, released by DGC Records on November 1, 1994, nearly seven months after the suicide of Kurt Cobain. It was part of the cable television series MTV Unplugged and features a mostly acoustic performance. It was recorded at Sony Music Studios in Hell's Kitchen, Manhattan, on November 18, 1993.

The show was directed by Beth McCarthy-Miller and aired on the cable television network MTV on December 16, 1993. In a break with MTV Unplugged tradition, Nirvana used some electric amplification and effects, and played mainly lesser-known material and covers, with performances of songs by David Bowie, Lead Belly, Meat Puppets and the Vaselines. They were joined by the rhythm guitarist Pat Smear and the cellist Lori Goldston, alongside the Meat Puppets members Cris and Curt Kirkwood for some songs.

MTV Unplugged was released after plans to release the performance as part of a live album, Verse Chorus Verse, were abandoned. It debuted at number one on the US Billboard 200 and was certified eight-times platinum in 2020. It won the Best Alternative Music Performance at the 1996 Grammy Awards, Nirvana's only Grammy Award. It was released on DVD in 2007.

== Background ==
MTV Unplugged began airing on MTV in 1989, with artists performing their hits on acoustic instruments in intimate settings. Nirvana had been in negotiations to appear for some time; Nirvana frontman Kurt Cobain finally accepted while touring with the Meat Puppets. Nirvana wanted to do something different from a typical MTV Unplugged performance, which they had found unimpressive. According to drummer Dave Grohl, "We'd seen the other Unpluggeds and didn't like many of them, because most bands would treat them like rock shows—play their hits like it was Madison Square Garden, except with acoustic guitars."

The group looked at Mark Lanegan's largely acoustic 1990 album The Winding Sheet, on which Cobain had performed, for inspiration. The ideas the band members came up with included covering David Bowie's "The Man Who Sold the World" and inviting members of the Meat Puppets to join them on stage. Still, the prospect of an entirely acoustic show reportedly made Cobain nervous.

== Rehearsal ==
Nirvana rehearsed for two days, at SST Rehearsal Facility, in Weehawken, New Jersey. The rehearsals were tense and difficult, with the band running into problems performing various songs. During the sessions, Cobain disagreed with MTV about the performance. Producer Alex Coletti recalled that the network was unhappy with the lack of hit Nirvana songs, and with the choice of the Meat Puppets as guests, saying: "They wanted to hear the 'right' names – Eddie Vedder or Tori Amos or God knows who."

The day before filming, Cobain refused to play, but he appeared at the studio the following afternoon. Cobain was suffering from drug withdrawal and nervousness at the time; one observer said, "There was no joking, no smiles, no fun coming from him ... everyone was more than a little worried about his performance."

== Recording ==
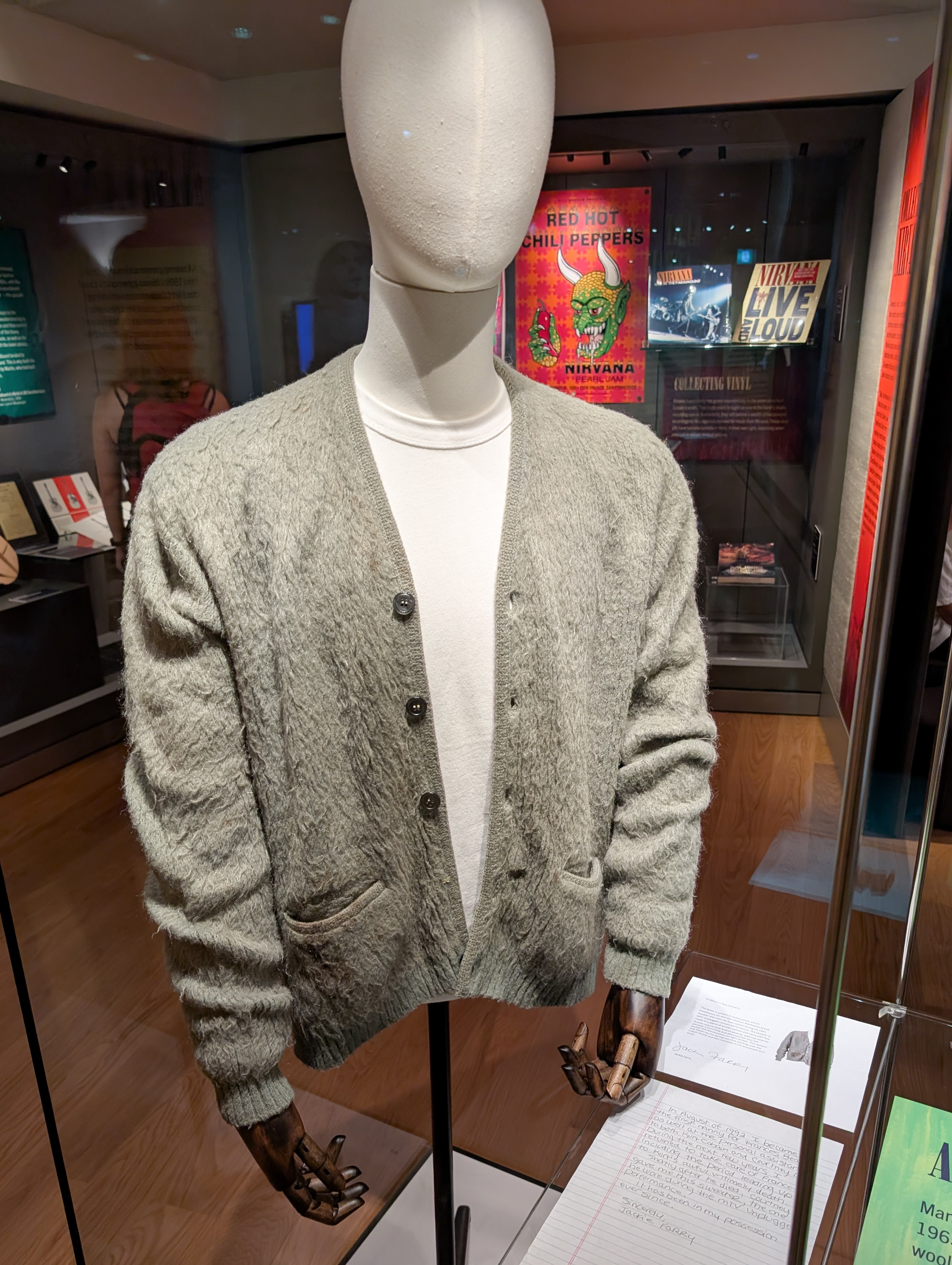
Cobain's mohair cardigan worn for the performance

Nirvana taped their performance on November 18, 1993, at Sony Studios in New York City. Cobain suggested the stage be decorated with stargazer lilies, black candles, and a crystal chandelier. Coletti asked, "You mean like a funeral?" Cobain replied, "Exactly. Like a funeral."

Will Sergeant of Echo & the Bunnymen claimed that the green cardigan Cobain wore in the performance belonged to him, however, this claim remains unverified.

Nirvana was joined by guitarist Pat Smear and cellist Lori Goldston, who had been touring with them. Despite the show's acoustic premise, Cobain insisted on running his acoustic guitar through his amplifier and effects pedals. Coletti built a fake box in front of the amplifier to disguise it as a monitor wedge. Coletti said, "It was Kurt's security blanket. He was used to hearing this guitar through his Fender. He wanted those effects. You can hear it on 'The Man Who Sold the World'. It's an acoustic guitar, but he's obviously going through an amp."

Unlike many artists who appeared on MTV Unplugged, Nirvana filmed the entire performance of 14 songs in a single take. It included one song from their debut, Bleach (1989), four from their second album, Nevermind (1991), three from the recently released In Utero, and six covers. As In Utero's "All Apologies" had not yet been released as a single, the only contemporary hit the band performed was the Nevermind single "Come as You Are".

Cris and Curt Kirkwood of the Meat Puppets joined to perform three of their songs with Nirvana. Novoselic said Cobain felt the Meat Puppets songs would suit the acoustic performance. Coletti said Cobain wanted the songs to be a "struggle for him vocally", and chose to strain rather than change them to a more comfortable key.

The set ended with a performance of the traditional "Where Did You Sleep Last Night", using an arrangement closely modeled after a 1944 recording by blues musician Lead Belly, whom Cobain described as his favorite performer. Lanegan had covered the song on The Winding Sheet (1990), with Cobain on guitar. The show's producers wanted an encore, but Cobain staunchly refused because he felt he could not top the "In the Pines" performance.

== Releases ==
The Nirvana episode of MTV Unplugged was broadcast on December 16, 1993. It was 45 minutes long and omitted the songs "Something in the Way" and "Oh Me". After Cobain died in April 1994, MTV aired the episode repeatedly. To meet demand for new Nirvana material and to counter bootlegging, in August 1994, DGC announced a double album, Verse Chorus Verse, comprising live performances including the entire MTV Unplugged performance. However, the task of compiling the album was too emotionally difficult for Novoselic and Grohl, so the project was cancelled a week after the announcement; the group opted to release just the Unplugged performance. Scott Litt, who produced the performance, returned to produce the record.

The performance was released on DVD on November 20, 2007. The DVD release featured the entire taping, in 5.1 DTS surround sound, including the two songs ("Something in the Way" and "Oh Me") excluded from the broadcast version. Bonus features consisted of the original broadcast version of the performance, the 1999 MTV special Bare Witness: Nirvana Unplugged, featuring the recollections of MTV producers and audience members, and five full-band songs taped during the pre-show rehearsal: "Come as You Are", "Polly", "Plateau", "Pennyroyal Tea", and "The Man Who Sold the World".

== Reception ==
Professional ratings
Initial reviews (in 1994)
Review scores
Source	Rating
Christgau's Consumer Guide	A
Entertainment Weekly	A
The Guardian	4/4 stars
Music Week	5/5 stars
NME	9/10
Q	4/5 stars
Rolling Stone	4/5 stars

MTV Unplugged in New York was released on November 1, 1994. It debuted at number one on the Billboard 200 and sold 310,500 copies, the highest first-week sales of Nirvana's career. By March 1995, it had outsold In Utero with 6.8 million copies sold.

The album received positive reviews. Tom Hibbert of Q said that as an acoustic ensemble, Nirvana sounded "most moving, possessed of a ragged glory". Rolling Stone writer Barbara O'Dair found the record "stirring and occasionally brilliant" with "spare and gorgeous spots everywhere", highlighting the band's chemistry on "All Apologies" and Cobain's unaccompanied performance of "Pennyroyal Tea". Ben Thompson from Mojo felt that unlike most "unplugged" releases, the format's "colourless, generic aspect" and not seeing the actual performance benefits Nirvana's record because of how intense it seems in light of Cobain's death. In Entertainment Weekly, David Browne felt unsettled listening to it: "Beyond inducing a sense of loss for Cobain himself, Unplugged elicits a feeling of musical loss, too: the delicacy and intimacy of these acoustic rearrangements hint at where Nirvana (or at least Cobain, who was said to be frustrated with the limitations of the band) could have gone."

MTV Unplugged in New York was voted the fourth-best album of the year in Pazz & Jop, an annual poll of prominent American critics published by The Village Voice. Robert Christgau, the poll's supervisor, also ranked the album fourth in his own year-end list, deeming it a testament to Cobain's depth of feeling, "sincerity" as a vocalist, and distinction from other sensitive alternative rock types such as Eddie Vedder and Lou Barlow: "The vocal performance he evokes is John Lennon's on John Lennon/Plastic Ono Band. And he did it in one take." Greek magazine Pop & Rock rated the album third best of 1994, and the best rock-pop album of 1994.

=== Retrospective ===
Professional ratings
Retrospective reviews (after 1994)
Review scores
Source	Rating
AllMusic	5/5 stars
Blender	5/5 stars
Pitchfork	9.5/10
The Rolling Stone Album Guide	5/5 stars

In a retrospective review for AllMusic, senior editor Stephen Thomas Erlewine said MTV Unplugged in New York was "fearlessly confessional", as it found Nirvana and Cobain "on the verge of discovering a new sound and style". Jason Mendelsohn from PopMatters believed its intimate folk rock quality was radical from Nirvana and Cobain, "as crass of a business move as it was" by their record label. In The Rolling Stone Album Guide (2004), journalist Charles M. Young called it Nirvana's "second masterpiece" after Nevermind, and claimed that Cobain could have "revolutionized folk music the same way he had rock" because of his striking voice; he said his songs worked equally well with "a loud band bashing away behind you" or "with just an acoustic guitar". Maeve McDermott of USA Today called it "an album of transcendent folk rock that glimpsed what could've been the band's next post-grunge era, had frontman Kurt Cobain survived long enough to see its musical leanings through."

The Guardian wrote that MTV Unplugged in New York had become "inextricably linked" to Cobain's death a few months after its recording, citing the funereal set design and the sense that Nirvana was "on the verge of a new musical direction, beyond their grunge roots". It named an image from the performance an "era-defining photograph". In 2007, the BBC Two series Seven Ages of Rock called Nirvana's performance of "Where Did You Sleep Last Night" a surreal requiem for Cobain. A 2013 article by critic Andrew Wallace Chamings in The Atlantic described it as one of the greatest live performances of all time:

For the final line, "I would shiver the whole night through," Cobain jumps up an octave, forcing him to strain so far he screams and cracks. He hits the word "shiver" so hard that the band stops, as if a fight broke out at a sitcom wedding. Next he howls the word "whole" and then does something very strange in the brief silence that follows, something that's hard to describe: he opens his piercingly blue eyes so suddenly it feels like someone or something else is looking out under the bleached lank fringe, with a strange clarity.

In 2012, Rolling Stone placed MTV Unplugged in New York number 313 on its list of "The 500 Greatest Albums of All Time". The 2020 edition of the list placed it at number 279. Rolling Stone also named it the 95th best album of the 1990s. In 2012, Rolling Stone readers voted it the 8th-best live album. NME named MTV Unplugged in New York the greatest live album in 2011, and Kerrang listed it among the 11 best live albums of all time. In 2014, Guitar World ranked named MTV Unplugged in New York one of the "50 iconic albums that defined 1994", and in 2019 named it one of the best live albums. In 2020, the Telegraph named it the 13th-greatest live albums of all time, and 2020, Planet Rock named it one of the 100 greatest live albums. It was also included in the book 1001 Albums You Must Hear Before You Die. Reviewing the DVD release in 2007, the Los Angeles Times wrote that it "deserves a place on the rock TV history shelf alongside the informal, sit-down section of Elvis Presley's epic comeback special in 1968".

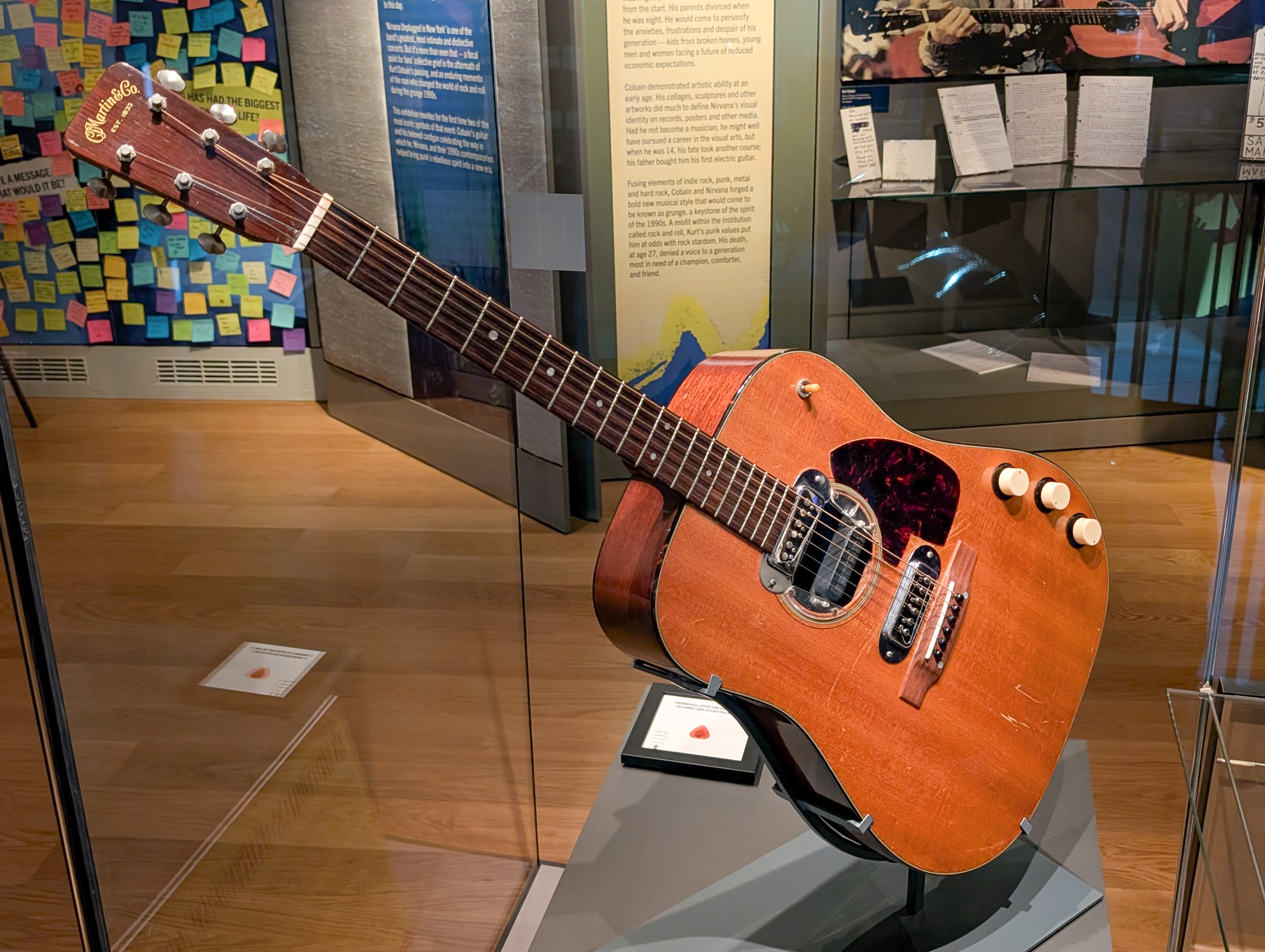
Cobain's Martin D-18E guitar used for the performance

In June 2016, the 1959 Martin D-18E guitar used by Cobain at the Unplugged concert was legally transferred by Cobain's daughter, Frances Bean Cobain, as a gift to her husband, Isaiah Silva, the frontman of rock band the Eeries. After their divorce, Frances and Cobain's widow, Courtney Love, tried to retrieve it. Love called the guitar a "treasured heirloom" and said it was "not [Silva's] to take". In 2018, during their divorce settlement proceedings, the court rejected Silva's request for spousal support, ownership of their house, and reimbursement of his legal fees but awarded him the guitar. In 2020, it was sold at Julien's Auctions for US$6 million to Peter Freedman of Røde Microphones, making it the most expensive guitar ever sold at auction at the time.

== Track listing ==
All tracks are written by Kurt Cobain except where noted.

No.	Title	Writer(s)	Original release	Length
1.	"About a Girl"		Bleach	3:37
2.	"Come as You Are"		Nevermind	4:13
3.	"Jesus Doesn't Want Me for a Sunbeam" (Vaselines cover)	Eugene Kelly, Frances McKee	Dying for It	4:37
4.	"The Man Who Sold the World" (David Bowie cover)	David Bowie	The Man Who Sold the World	4:20
5.	"Pennyroyal Tea"		In Utero	3:40
6.	"Dumb"		In Utero	2:53
7.	"Polly"		Nevermind	3:16
8.	"On a Plain"		Nevermind	3:44
9.	"Something in the Way"		Nevermind	4:01
10.	"Plateau" (Meat Puppets cover)	Curt Kirkwood	Meat Puppets II	3:38
11.	"Oh Me" (Meat Puppets cover)	Kirkwood	Meat Puppets II	3:26
12.	"Lake of Fire" (Meat Puppets cover)	Kirkwood	Meat Puppets II	2:55
13.	"All Apologies"		In Utero	4:23
14.	"Where Did You Sleep Last Night"	Traditional; credited to Lead Belly		5:08
Total length:				53:50

== Personnel ==
Credits adapted from CD liner notes.

Nirvana

- Kurt Cobain – guitar, vocals
- Krist Novoselic – acoustic bass; accordion (3), guitar (10–12)
- Dave Grohl – drums, vocals; acoustic bass (3)
- Pat Smear – guitar

Additional musicians

- Lori Goldston – cello (3, 4, 6–9, 13, 14)
- Curt Kirkwood – guitar (10–12)
- Cris Kirkwood – acoustic bass (10–12), back-up vocals (10, 12)

Technical

- Alex Coletti – production (MTV)
- Nirvana – production (sound)
- Scott Litt – production (sound)
- Stephen Marcussen – mastering
- Robert Fisher – art direction, design
- Jennifer Youngblood-Grohl – photography
- Frank Micelotta – photography

== Charts ==
=== Weekly charts ===
Weekly chart performance MTV Unplugged in New York
Chart (1994–95)	Peak position
Australian Albums (ARIA)	1
Australian Alternative Albums (ARIA)	1
Austrian Albums (Ö3 Austria)	1
Belgian Albums (IFPI Belgium)	1
Belgian Albums (Ultratop Flanders)	3
Belgian Albums (Ultratop Wallonia)	6
Buenos Aires Albums (UPI)	10
Canada Top Albums/CDs (RPM)	1
Canada Albums (The Record)	1
Danish Albums (Hitlisten)	4
Dutch Albums (Album Top 100)	2
Estonian Albums (Raadio 2)	3
European Top 100 Albums (Music & Media)	2
Finnish Albums (The Official Finnish Charts)	3
French Albums (SNEP)	1
German Albums (Offizielle Top 100)	6
Greek Albums (Pop & Rock)	4
Hungarian Albums (MAHASZ)	9
Irish Albums (IFPI Ireland)	1
Italian Albums (Musica e Dischi)	8
Japanese Albums (Oricon)	20
New Zealand Albums (RMNZ)	1
Norwegian Albums (VG-lista)	6
Portuguese Albums (AFP)	1
Scottish Albums (Official Charts)	3
South African Albums (SABC)	2
Spanish Albums (PROMUSICAE)	1
Swedish Albums (Sverigetopplistan)	2
Swiss Albums (Schweizer Hitparade)	3
UK Albums (Official Charts)	1
UK Rock & Metal Albums (Official Charts)	1
US Billboard 200	1
US Top 100 Pop Albums (Cashbox)	1
Zimbabwean Albums	8

Chart (2010)	Peak position
Greek Albums (IFPI)	47

Chart (2015)	Peak position
US Top Catalog Albums (Billboard)	1

Chart (2016)	Peak position
Italian Albums (FIMI)	61

Chart (2017)	Peak position
Irish Albums (Official Charts)	39

Chart (2019)	Peak position
US Top Rock Albums (Billboard)	14

Chart (2022)	Peak position
Greek Albums (Billboard)	3

=== Year-end charts ===
Year-end chart performance for MTV Unplugged in New York
Chart (1994)	Position
Australian Albums (ARIA)	7
Austrian Albums (Ö3 Austria)	23
Canadian Albums (RPM)	30
Dutch Albums (MegaCharts)	25
European Top 100 Albums (Music & Media)	4
French Albums (SNEP)	5
Italian Albums (Musica e dischi)	53
New Zealand Albums (RMNZ)	46
Spanish Albums (AFYVE)	37
Swedish Albums & Compilations (Sverigetopplistan)	26
UK Albums (OCC)	39

Chart (1995)	Position
Australian Albums (ARIA)	13
Austrian Albums (Ö3 Austria)	15
Belgian Albums (Ultratop Flanders)	14
Belgian Albums (Ultratop Wallonia)	8
Dutch Albums (MegaCharts)	24
Euro Top 100 Albums (Music & Media)	4
French Albums (SNEP)	7
German Albums (Offizielle Top 100)	19
Italian Albums (Musica e dischi)	52
New Zealand Albums (RMNZ)	17
Spanish Albums (AFYVE)	17
Swedish Albums (IFPI Sverige)	92
Swiss Albums (Schweizer Hitparade)	9
UK Albums (OCC)	73
US Billboard 200	13

Chart (1996)	Position
Australian Albums (ARIA)	48

Chart (2002)	Position
Canadian Alternative Albums (Nielsen SoundScan)	189
Canadian Metal Albums (Nielsen SoundScan)	98

Chart (2015)	Position
UK Vinyl Albums (OCC)	10

Chart (2016)	Position
UK Vinyl Albums (OCC)	21

Chart (2017)	Position
UK Vinyl Albums (OCC)	18

Chart (2018)	Position
Australian Vinyl Albums (ARIA)	15
UK Vinyl Albums (OCC)	25

Chart (2019)	Position
Australian Vinyl Albums (ARIA)	15
Belgian Albums (Ultratop Flanders)	123
Belgian Albums (Ultratop Wallonia)	155
Portuguese Albums (AFP)	96

Chart (2020)	Position
Australian Vinyl Albums (ARIA)	21
Belgian Albums (Ultratop Flanders)	88
Belgian Albums (Ultratop Wallonia)	120
Croatian Albums (Foreign Top 40)	39
UK Vinyl Albums (OCC)	36
US Top Rock Albums (Billboard)	85

Chart (2021)	Position
Australian Vinyl Albums (ARIA)	7
Belgian Albums (Ultratop Flanders)	94
Belgian Albums (Ultratop Wallonia)	131
Irish Vinyl Albums (IRMA)	12
Portuguese Albums (AFP)	76
US Top Rock Albums (Billboard)	71

Chart (2022)	Position
Australian Vinyl Albums (ARIA)	23
Belgian Albums (Ultratop Flanders)	170

Chart (2023)	Position
Belgian Albums (Ultratop Flanders)	188

Chart (2024)	Position
Australian Vinyl Albums (ARIA)	46
Belgian Albums (Ultratop Flanders)	181

=== Decade-end charts ===
Chart (2010–2019)	Position
UK Vinyl Albums (Official Charts Company)	16

=== DVD charts ===
Chart (2007)	Peak position
Australian DVD Chart (ARIA Charts)	3
Dutch DVD Chart (MegaCharts)	8
Norwegian DVD Chart (VG-lista)	1
UK Music Videos (Official Charts)	3
US Top Music Video Sales (Billboard)	6

== Certifications ==
Region	Certification	Certified units/sales
Argentina (CAPIF)	3× Platinum	180,000^{^}
Australia (ARIA)	5× Platinum	350,000^{^}
Austria (IFPI Austria)	2× Platinum	100,000^{*}
Belgium (BRMA)	3× Platinum	150,000^{*}
Brazil (Pro-Música Brasil)	Platinum	250,000^{*}
Canada (Music Canada)	9× Platinum	900,000^{^}
Denmark (IFPI Danmark)	5× Platinum	100,000^{‡}
Finland (Musiikkituottajat)	Gold	24,373
France (SNEP)	2× Platinum	600,000^{*}
Germany (BVMI)	Gold	250,000^{‡}
Italy (FIMI) sales since 2009	Platinum	50,000^{‡}
Japan (RIAJ)	Platinum	200,000^{^}
Mexico (AMPROFON)	Gold	100,000^{^}
Netherlands (NVPI)	Platinum	100,000^{^}
New Zealand (RMNZ)	2× Platinum	30,000^{‡}
Norway (IFPI Norway)	Platinum	50,000^{*}
Poland (ZPAV) Certification for original release	Platinum	100,000^{*}
Poland (ZPAV) Separate certification for re-issued version	Platinum	20,000^{‡}
Portugal (AFP)	Gold	3,500^{‡}
Spain (Promusicae)	2× Platinum	200,000^{^}
Sweden (GLF)	Platinum	100,000^{^}
Switzerland (IFPI Switzerland)	2× Platinum	100,000^{^}
United Kingdom (BPI)	3× Platinum	900,000^{‡}
United States (RIAA)	8× Platinum	8,000,000^{‡}
Summaries
Europe (IFPI)	2× Platinum	2,000,000^{*}
^{*} Sales figures based on certification alone.^{^} Shipments figures based on certification alone.^{‡} Sales+streaming figures based on certification alone.

=== DVD release ===
Region	Certification	Certified units/sales
Argentina (CAPIF)	Platinum	8,000^{^}
Australia (ARIA)	Platinum	15,000^{^}
New Zealand (RMNZ)	Platinum	5,000^{^}
United Kingdom (BPI)	Platinum	50,000^{*}
United States (RIAA)	7× Platinum	700,000^{^}
^{*} Sales figures based on certification alone.^{^} Shipments figures based on certification alone.
