= Plateau (song) =

1984 song by the Meat Puppets

Song by Meat Puppets

from the album Meat Puppets II
- Released: November 1, 1984
- Genre: Country; psychedelia
- Length: 2:22
- Label: SST Records
- Songwriter: Curt Kirkwood

"Plateau"

Song by Nirvana

from the album MTV Unplugged in New York
- Released: November 1, 1994
- Recorded: November 18, 1993
- Venue: Sony Music, New York City
- Genre: Alternative rock
- Length: 3:37
- Label: DGC
- Songwriter: Curt Kirkwood
- Producers: Alex Coletti; Scott Litt; Nirvana

MTV Unplugged in New York track listing
- 13 tracks: 1. "About a Girl"; 2. "Come as You Are"; 3. "Jesus Doesn't Want Me for a Sunbeam"; 4. "The Man Who Sold the World"; 5. "Pennyroyal Tea"; 6. "Dumb"; 7. "Polly"; 8. "On a Plain"; 9. "Something in the Way"; 10. "Plateau"; 11. "Oh, Me"; 12. "Lake of Fire"; 13. "All Apologies"; 14. "Where Did You Sleep Last Night"

"Plateau" is a song by American alternative rock band the Meat Puppets, written by vocalist and guitarist Curt Kirkwood. It appears on the band's second studio album, Meat Puppets II, released by SST Records in April 1984.

The song was popularized when Curt and his brother, Meat Puppets vocalist and bassist Cris Kirkwood, performed it with American rock band Nirvana at their MTV Unplugged appearance in November 1993.

== Composition ==
Matthew Blackwell of Pitchfork wrote that the song's lyrics describe "striving toward the afterlife as scaling a grand plateau where 'holy ghosts and talk show hosts are planted in the sand/To beautify the foothills and shake the many hands.' But our narrator remains unbothered; he knows that 'there's nothing on the top but a bucket and a mop/And an illustrated book about birds', nothing to meet the newly deceased at their goal other than mundanity."

== Reception ==
The song was included in The Pitchfork 500, a book published by online music publication Pitchfork in 2008, featuring their list of the "greatest songs" from 1977 to 2006.

== Nirvana version ==
"Plateau" was one of three songs from Meat Puppets II, along with "Oh, Me", and "Lake of Fire", covered by Nirvana at their MTV Unplugged concert at Sony Music Studios in New York City on November 23, 1993. All three songs featured Curt on lead guitar and Cris on bass and backing vocals, alongside Nirvana vocalist and guitarist Kurt Cobain on vocals, Nirvana bassist Krist Novoselic on second guitar, and Nirvana drummer Dave Grohl on drums.

An edited version of the show, including "Plateau" and "Lake of Fire" but not "Oh, Me", was first broadcast in December 1993. It was aired repeatedly by MTV and other video channels following Cobain's suicide in April 1994. A more complete version of the show, featuring all 14 complete songs performed, was released on the live album, MTV Unplugged in New York, in November 1994, which opened at number one on the Billboard 200. A DVD of the unedited performance was released in 2007, which also featured footage of the Kirkwood brothers rehearsing "Plateau" with Nirvana prior to the show.

=== Personnel ===
Personnel are taken from the 25th anniversary edition of MTV Unplugged in New York

- Kurt Cobain – lead vocals
- Dave Grohl – drums
- Krist Novoselic – guitar

Additional personnel

- Curt Kirkwood – guitar
- Cris Kirkwood – bass, backing vocals

== Legacy ==
The title of the June 2006 debut album by English rapper Plan B, Who Needs Actions When You Got Words, was taken from a lyric from the song. The Nirvana version was sampled on his 2007 mixtape, Paint It Blacker: The Bootleg Album.
