= Rat Farm =

Studio album by Meat Puppets
- Released: April 16, 2013
- Recorded: 2012–2013
- Studios: Yellow Dog Studios, Austin, Texas
- Genres: Alternative rock; country rock; psychedelia
- Length: 45:52
- Label: Megaforce
- Producer: Curt Kirkwood

Meat Puppets chronology
Lollipop (2011)	Rat Farm (2013)	Dusty Notes (2019)

Rat Farm is the fourteenth full-length studio album by the Meat Puppets. It was released on April 16, 2013, through Megaforce Records.

== Background and recording ==
On writing the music Curt Kirkwood remarked: "I tried to write stuff that would stand on its own — just the chords and the melodies, and play it kind of straight... I think that was the guiding boundary that I gave myself. It was one of those things where a lot of times, in the past especially, Cris (bassist Cris Kirkwood) would go, ‘Well, that's all there is? Let's put a prog rock part in the middle.’ But I tried to hold it off as much as I could."

== Musical style ==
Lucy Jones of British music publication NME adjudged Rat Farm as "gently fried country-rock and psychedelia" and its guitar solos to be "Neil Young-worthy".

Curt Kirkwood, the band's singer/guitarist and primary songwriter, described the album as "real blown-out folk music".

== Reception ==
As of June 2013, based on 17 reviews, Rat Farm has a score of 74 on Metacritic, indicating "generally favorable reviews". This is the highest score of their albums released since 2000. The Independent described the album as "dizzying psychedelic country in finest Meat Puppets tradition, full of slightly off-centre harmonies in Grateful Dead manner, and plenty of Kirkwood's swirling, trippy guitar." AllMusic said: "The tracks on their 14th outing are the closest they've come in a long time to the colorful, no-frills brand of twangy alt-rock and informal punk (with hints of Americana, country, folk, and prog) that they instilled on their SST records." The Austin Chronicle said that Curt Kirkwood "continues penning some of the strongest, sweetest, and compellingly twisted material of his already storied songwriting career," and that "[t]here's enough distorted weirdness, easygoing melodies, and guitar both hard and jangly to demonstrate why the Meat Puppets influenced both Nirvana and R.E.M."

== Track listing ==
All tracks are written by Curt Kirkwood, except where noted.

No.	Title	Writer(s)	Length
1.	"Rat Farm"		3:54
2.	"One More Drop"		3:46
3.	"Down"		3:25
4.	"Leave Your Head Alone"		4:20
5.	"Again"		3:25
6.	"You Don't Know"		4:13
7.	"Waiting"		3:14
8.	"Time and Money"	Kurkwood, Kyle Ellison	3:50
9.	"Sometimes Blue"		3:48
10.	"Original One"		4:12
11.	"River Rose"		3:22
12.	"Sweet"		4:22
Total length:			45:52

== Personnel ==
All personnel credits for Rat Farm are adapted from the album's liner notes.

Meat Puppets

- Curt Kirkwood – guitar, vocals; production, arrangement; artwork
- Cris Kirkwood – bass, keyboards, vocals; artwork
- Shandon Sahm – drums, percussion

Technical personnel

- Dave Percefull – recording
- Matt Mele – assistant engineer
- John Plymale – mixing
- Greg Calbi – mastering
- Steve Fallone – mastering assistant

Creative personnel

- Jaime Butler – artwork
- Douglas Heusser – graphic design
