= Sewn Together =

Studio album by Meat Puppets
- Released: May 12, 2009
- Recorded: 2009 at the Saltmine, Phoenix, Arizona
- Genre: Alternative rock; folk rock; psychedelic rock
- Length: 48:52
- Label: Megaforce
- Producer: Curt Kirkwood

Meat Puppets chronology
| Rise to Your Knees (2007) | Sewn Together (2009) | Lollipop (2011) |

Singles from Sewn Together
- 1. "Rotten Shame" Released: 2009

Sewn Together is American rock band the Meat Puppets' twelfth full-length studio album, released on May 12, 2009, on CD and vinyl. It was the follow-up to their 2007 reunion album Rise to Your Knees.

== Recording and background ==
=== Background ===
Curt Kirkwood commented in an interview that the album was put together over a short period of time, comparing its production to the group's earlier albums. He said, "In the '80s, we used to just crap this stuff out. Those SST records cost, like, five grand apiece, if that much, and those are the records that made people like us. Now, if I can get away with it, I'll make a record as cheap as I can and put as little work as I can into it, which is what we did with this one. I don't like putting a lot of time into it. We cut a track, and if we've played it halfway right, we're done with it".

=== Recording and production ===
Sewn Together was recorded at drummer Ted Marcus' apartment and at The Saltmine Studios in Mesa, Arizona, United States.

== Musical style ==
Courtney Devores of Charlotte Observer delineated the sound of Sewn Together as "warm, psychedelic folk-rock".

== Reception ==
Professional ratings
Review scores
| Source | Rating |
|---|---|
| Pitchfork Media | 6.1/10 |
| Q | Aug. 2009, pg. 109 |
| Spin | 3.5/5 stars |

On review aggregation site Metacritic, Sewn Together has a 71 (out of 100) favorable rating based on 14 critics, indicating "generally favorable reviews".

The Boston Globe said:

"At its best, Arizona's Meat Puppets makes you think there are no boundaries between punk, country, and pop. The appropriately named "Sewn Together" finds 50-year-old Curt Kirkwood and his 48-year-old brother Cris Kirkwood crafting mongrel music as fine as anything in the band's catalog. ... The group's signatures are all here: the loping honky-tonk rhythms, the piercing punk wordplay, and the psychedelic glint that makes even the mellowest passages sound a little nervous."

== Track listing ==
1. "Sewn Together" - 3:07
2. "Blanket of Weeds" - 5:14
3. "I'm Not You" - 4:27
4. "Sapphire" - 4:00
5. "Rotten Shame" - 5:19
6. "Go to Your Head" - 3:44
7. "Clone" - 4:37
8. "Smoke" - 3:16
9. "S.K.A." - 3:47
10. "Nursery Rhyme" - 4:28
11. "The Monkey and the Snake" - 3:09
12. "Love Mountain" - 3:44

== Personnel ==
- Curt Kirkwood - vocals, guitars, mandolin
- Cris Kirkwood - bass guitar, synthesizers, vocals
- Ted Marcus - drums; organ on "Love Mountain"
