= Meat Puppets II =

Studio album by Meat Puppets
- Released: April 1984
- Studios: Total Access, Redondo Beach, California
- Genres: Cowpunk; psychedelic rock; bluegrass; folk; Americana
- Length: 29:57 (original); 48:01 (reissue)
- Label: SST Records

Meat Puppets chronology
Meat Puppets (1982)	Meat Puppets II (1984)	Up on the Sun (1985)

Meat Puppets II is the second studio album by American rock band Meat Puppets, released in April 1984 by SST Records. Rykodisc reissued the album in 1999 with extra tracks and B-sides, including a cover of "What To Do" by The Rolling Stones.

II is musically a departure from the Meat Puppets' debut album, which largely consisted of noise-filled hardcore punk with unintelligible vocals. While there are hardcore and punk rock-influenced songs, II encompasses a wide assortment of styles including country rock, ballads, and psychedelia.

The album is considered to be one of the best Meat Puppets albums by critics and listeners. Curt and Cris Kirkwood acoustically performed three songs from II with Nirvana for MTV Unplugged in New York, in which they played "Plateau", "Oh, Me", and "Lake of Fire".

== Background ==
The album artwork was created by Curt Kirkwood and Neal Holliday.

=== Music ===
The Chicago Reader described the sound on II as an '"inchoate blur," and Pitchfork derscribed the album's tone as "Western-gothic". Music journalist Andrew Earles described the album as a "country-roots-punk-hardcore album" and noted the apparent influence of ZZ Top and "other masters of fried '70s boogie".

Louis Pattison of Pitchfork assessed: "If Meat Puppets' self-titled debut—a bristly fusion of hardcore thrash and Beefheart weirdness—could pass for a punk record, II was very much on its own trip. Its outsider Americana took in Grateful Dead-style jamming, fearsome pulpit sermons, and peyote-addled surrealism. Cowpunk thrashes like 'Split Myself in Two' and 'New Gods' suggested the trio hadn't entirely outgrown its hardcore roots, but the moments that linger are the pretty ones, like the shimmering guitar instrumental 'Aurora Borealis,' a beautiful acid trip amid the cacti."

== Critical reception ==
Professional ratings
Review scores
Source	Rating
AllMusic	5/5 stars
Chicago Tribune	4/4 stars
Entertainment Weekly	A−
Los Angeles Times	83/100
NME	8/10
Pitchfork	9.0/10
Rolling Stone	4/5 stars
Spin Alternative Record Guide	10/10
Uncut	5/5 stars
The Village Voice	A−

Kurt Loder, in an April 1984 review in Rolling Stone, described Meat Puppets II as "one of the funniest and most enjoyable albums" of the year, as he thought the band had developed "beyond head-banging" to become "a kind of cultural trash compacter", blending "hard-core flip-outs" with "a bit of the Byrds ... Hendrix-style guitar ... and ... Blonde on Blonde–style wordsmithing." In his review for The Village Voice, Robert Christgau wrote that Curt Kirkwood had combined "the amateur and the avant-garde with a homely appeal," which resulted in a "calmly demented country music" in a "psychedelic" vein. Robert Hilburn commented in the Los Angeles Times that the Meat Puppets are "far more of an acquired promising though willfully unfocused rock act."

In a retrospective review for Pitchfork in 2024, staff writer Matthew Blackwell awarded Meat Puppets II a score of 9.0 out of 10, calling it "a sun-baked, country-fried, acid-addled cowpunk album that could have come from nowhere else but the Arizona desert."

In 2025, Al Shipley of Spin named the album as the second best Meat Puppets album, second to Up on the Sun.

In 2026, AllMusic declared the album was one of the "13 Greatest Sophomore Albums in Music History".

=== Legacy and impact ===
The album was number 94 on Pitchfork's "Best Albums of the 1980s." Slant Magazine listed the album at number 91 on its list of "Best Albums of the 1980s."

The Meat Puppets performed the album live in its entirety at the All Tomorrow's Parties festival in Monticello, New York, in 2008 as part of the ATP Don't Look Back season, and again in December, 2008, at a performance in London.

The Meat Puppets' SST labelmates Minutemen covered "Lost" on the live EP Tour-Spiel and their last studio album, 3-Way Tie (For Last).

Curt Kirkwood and Cris Kirkwood of Meat Puppets joined Nirvana on stage for their 1993 performance for MTV Unplugged, which was later released as the Nirvana album MTV Unplugged In New York.

== Track listing ==
All tracks are written by Curt Kirkwood, unless otherwise noted.

Original release
No.	Title	Length
1.	"Split Myself in Two"	2:22
2.	"Magic Toy Missing"	1:20
3.	"Lost"	3:24
4.	"Plateau"	2:22
5.	"Aurora Borealis"	2:44
6.	"We're Here"	2:40
7.	"Climbing"	2:41
8.	"New Gods"	2:09
9.	"Oh, Me"	2:59
10.	"Lake of Fire"	1:54
11.	"I'm a Mindless Idiot"	2:26
12.	"The Whistling Song"	2:56

1999 CD bonus tracks
No.	Title	Writer(s)	Length
13.	"Teenager(s)"	Meat Puppets	3:36
14.	"I'm Not Here"		1:55
15.	"New Gods" (demo version)		2:13
16.	"Lost" (demo version)		3:03
17.	"What to Do"	Jagger–Richards	2:35
18.	"100% of Nothing"		1:50
19.	"Aurora Borealis" (demo version)		2:28

== Personnel ==
Meat Puppets

- Curt Kirkwood – guitar, vocals
- Cris Kirkwood – bass, vocals
- Derrick Bostrom – drums

Technical

- Spot – engineer
- Curt Kirkwood, Neal Holliday – cover artwork
