= Lake of Fire (song) =

1994 single by Meat Puppets

Single by Meat Puppets

from the album Meat Puppets II and Too High to Die
- Released: March 12, 1994
- Genre: Cowpunk (1984 version); Hard rock (1994 version)
- Length: 1:54 (1984 version)
- Label: London Records
- Songwriter: Curt Kirkwood

Meat Puppets singles chronology
| "Roof with a Hole" (1994) | "Lake of Fire" (1994) | "Scum" (1995) |

"Lake of Fire" is a song by the American alternative rock band the Meat Puppets, written by vocalist and guitarist Curt Kirkwood. It appears on their second album, Meat Puppets II, released in April 1984. An alternate version appeared as a hidden track on their 1994 album, Too High to Die.

The song gained widespread exposure when it was covered, along with two other songs from Meat Puppets II, by American rock band Nirvana during their MTV Unplugged appearance in November 1993. All three songs during the performance featured Curt on guitar and his brother and Meat Puppets bassist Cris Kirkwood on bass and backing vocals.

== Background ==
Curt Kirkwood said, "I lived with [bandmates] Cris and Derrick, and probably Cris' girlfriend, Kelly. ... They went to a Halloween party and I was disgruntled because I thought it was nonsense that adults should callously attempt to alter their appearances, that we are already sufficiently foul. ... I was younger then. I just said, 'Talk about man's fall from grace. This is it.'" He also described the song as a "toss-off" and a "cartoon".

== Promo single ==
The Too High to Die version was released as a promotional single, and featured three versions of the song.

=== Track listing ===
(All songs by Curt Kirkwood unless otherwise noted)

1. "Lake of Fire" (1994 version) – 3:12
2. "Lake of Fire" (acoustic version) – 1:58
3. "Lake of Fire" (live) – 2:56

== Nirvana cover ==
"Lake of Fire"

Promotional single by Nirvana

from the album MTV Unplugged in New York
- Released: April 17, 1995
- Recorded: November 18, 1993 at Sony Music Studios in New York City
- Genre: Acoustic rock
- Length: 2:56
- Label: DGC Records
- Songwriter: Curt Kirkwood
- Producers: Alex Coletti, Scott Litt, Nirvana

Nirvana singles chronology
| "Where Did You Sleep Last Night" (1995) | "Lake of Fire" (1995) | "Aneurysm" (1996) |

MTV Unplugged in New York track listing
- 13 tracks: 1. "About a Girl"; 2. "Come as You Are"; 3. "Jesus Doesn't Want Me for a Sunbeam"; 4. "The Man Who Sold the World"; 5. "Pennyroyal Tea"; 6. "Dumb"; 7. "Polly"; 8. "On a Plain"; 9. "Something in the Way"; 10. "Plateau"; 11. "Oh, Me"; 12. "Lake of Fire"; 13. "All Apologies"; 14. "Where Did You Sleep Last Night"

"Lake of Fire" was one of three songs from Meat Puppets II, alongside "Plateau" and "Oh, Me," covered by Nirvana during their MTV Unplugged performance on November 18, 1993, at Sony Music Studios in New York City. All three songs featured Nirvana vocalist and guitarist Kurt Cobain on lead vocals, Curt Kirkwood on lead guitar, Cris Kirkwood on bass and backing vocals, Nirvana bassist Krist Novoselic on rhythm guitar, and Nirvana drummer Dave Grohl on drums. The show was first broadcast in December 1993, and aired numerous times following Cobain's suicide in April 1994. It was released as an album, MTV Unplugged in New York, in November 1994, which opened at number one on the Billboard 200.

Nirvana's cover of "Lake of Fire" was released as a promotional single in Australia, where it received some radio airplay.

=== Track listing ===
1. "Lake of Fire" – 2:57
2. "Where Did You Sleep Last Night" – 5:07

=== Weekly charts ===
| Chart (1995) | Peak position |
|---|---|
| Canada Contemporary Album Radio (The Record) | 31 |
| Canada Rock/Alternative (RPM) | 17 |
| US Mainstream Rock (Billboard) | 22 |
| US Rock Tracks Top 60 (Radio & Records) | 18 |

=== Year-end charts ===
| Chart (1995) | Peak position |
|---|---|
| US Top Rock Tracks (Radio & Records) | 92 |

=== Certifications ===
Sales certifications for "Lake of Fire"
| Region | Certification | Certified units/sales |
|---|---|---|
| Australia (ARIA) | Gold | 35,000^{‡} |
| New Zealand (RMNZ) | Platinum | 30,000^{‡} |
^{‡} Sales+streaming figures based on certification alone.

=== Release history ===
| Region | Date | Format(s) | Label(s) | Ref. |
|---|---|---|---|---|
| United States | April 17, 1995 | Rock radio | Geffen | |

== Other covers ==
- In 2020 Gramatik recorded a version featuring the vocals of Bill Burr titled "lake of fire flip".
- Lena Hall recorded a live version of the song for her 2015 album Sin & Salvation: Live at the Carlyle.
- In 2018, Eric Bachmann covered the song and released it as a single. His cover was also featured in the 2018 film Tag.

== See also ==
- Fire and brimstone
