= Carl W. Renstrom =

American businessman

Carl Willard Renstrom (September 27, 1902 – November 13, 1981) was an American multi-millionaire businessman who made his fortune selling hair curlers and other hair accessories through his company, Tip-Top Products.

== Early life ==
Renstrom was born in Omaha, Nebraska on September 27, 1902. His parents were Swedish immigrant Nils August Renstrom and his Iowa-born wife, Vera Pearl Bartlett. Renstrom's father was a general laborer who had a knack for mechanics. He filed several patents, including one for an electro-magnetic blanket in 1896.

Renstrom attended the public schools in Omaha, graduating from the now-defunct Commerce High School.

== Business career ==
Following his graduation from high school, Renstrom embarked on a variety of sales positions, including selling Fuller Brushes. When the Depression quickly reduced his sales of church bulletin boards, Renstrom founded Tip-Top Products Company and went looking for a product to sell. While selling door-to-door, Renstrom had crossed paths with a gentleman selling heatless liquid solder in a can.

After efforts to form a company with the man failed, Renstrom worked on replicating the unpatented solder in a squeezable tube. He initially manufactured the product in his basement and then went from store to store selling it. The solder was an immediate success and gave Renstrom financial security. Within a year he had purchased a building, and hired production and sales staffs. The building Renstrom purchased was at 1508 Burt Street in Omaha.

After his success with his solder product, Renstrom was looking for his next opportunity. His sister, Grace, had returned from Europe with a poorly made metal hair curler, purchased in Germany, that she showed to Renstrom. The curler was called the "Ruck Zuck".

Similar curlers were selling in the U.S. for about 5 cents each. Renstrom improved the curler's design and obtained his first patent for a simple metal hair curler on July 14, 1936. He christened the curler the Tip Top Easy Curler – four aluminum curlers on a card priced at 10 cents a card. The consumer response to the curler was overwhelming.

When World War II intervened and aluminum was at a premium, Renstrom retooled the machines that had once produced curlers to fabricate military wire reels, barbed wire throws and land mine crates. His production building had to expand to accommodate the volume.

Renstrom's experience working with the War Department on his military contracts led him to run for office as a Douglas County Commissioner. He was elected in 1944 and served through 1948.

When the war ended, he converted his curler production to plastic and expanded his hair product line. By 1964, Renstrom's company had received 24 patents and was manufacturing over 600 products.

In 1964, Renstrom sold his Tip-Top Products Company to Rayette Co., (later named Fabergé), of St. Paul, Minnesota for $25 million.

== Retirement ==
The sale of Tip-Top Products made Renstrom a very wealthy man. In retirement he continued to pursue business ventures that interested him: the development of the Granada Royale Hometel and the building of The Omaha Tower, both in Omaha. He donated to charities he cared about, including The Boys Club of Omaha. He entertained at homes in Omaha, Acapulco, Miami, Ontario, Canada, and Minnesota. In 1969, he dined twice with President Richard M. Nixon. But mainly, Renstrom traveled. He skied in Switzerland, fished in Mexico, scuba dived in The Bahamas, hunted in Europe and Canada, and photographed big game in Africa. Renstrom used his private Learjet to fly to whatever destination interested him. A friend of Renstrom's once told a reporter that he had agreed to accompany Renstrom on what he thought was a ten-day trip to Glasgow and Paris. By week five, the friend was pleading with Renstrom to start thinking about returning home.

== Acapulco ==
In the 1950s, Renstrom built a family vacation home in what was then the emerging resort town of Acapulco, Mexico. Renstrom christened the property Villa Vera, after his oldest daughter. Renstrom eventually added five smaller villas to the property to entertain clients and friends. His next door neighbor was Teddy Stauffer, whom Renstrom convinced to manage his property when he was away. The two entertained the "jet set" of the time.

Elizabeth Taylor married Mike Todd in what was originally the Renstrom family home (Villa No. 6), with Debbie Reynolds and Eddie Fisher as attendants. Lana Turner lived at Villa Vera for three years, and Brigitte Bardot honeymooned there. As the popularity of the area grew, Renstrom continued to expand the property, which today is called the Villa Vera Hotel & Racquet Club.

== Personal life ==
Renstrom married four times. He divorced his first wife, Catherine A. Gannon, in 1953. She was the mother of his elder daughter, Vera Pearl Kirkwood. His second wife, Genevieve L. Taylor, died of leukemia in 1956. He divorced his third wife, Elizabeth Renstrom, in 1976. She was the mother of Renstrom's younger daughter, Elizabeth Ann "Lisa" Renstrom. In 1978, he married his fourth wife, Carmen Patricia de Alba, of Mexico City. Carmen was the mother of his only son, Carlos Rene Renstrom, who was four at the time of his father's death.

Carl W. Renstrom died November 13, 1981, in Omaha, Nebraska, and was buried in Forest Lawn Cemetery there.

After his death, Renstrom's heirs sub-divided his 84-acre horse farm at 10001 Pacific Street in Omaha for redevelopment. Renstrom's mansion and 8 acres remained a private home, while the remaining land became apartments, office towers and the One Pacific Place shopping center.

Elizabeth Ann "Lisa" Renstrom, Renstrom's youngest daughter, is a past president of The Sierra Club.

Two of Renstrom's grandsons, by his elder daughter Vera Pearl Renstrom, are Cris and Curt Kirkwood, founding members of the alternative punk rock band Meat Puppets.
