= Lollipop (album) =

Studio album by Meat Puppets
- Released: April 12, 2011
- Genre: Power pop
- Length: 46:30
- Label: Megaforce
- Producer: Curt Kirkwood

Meat Puppets chronology
Sewn Together (2009)	Lollipop (2011)	Rat Farm (2013)

Singles from Lollipop
- 1. "Damn Thing" Released: 2011

Lollipop is the Meat Puppets' thirteenth full-length studio album. It was released on April 12, 2011, through Megaforce Records.

== Content ==
=== Musical style ===
The A.V. Club opined Lollipop to be "a strong collection of power-pop songs".

=== Lyrical content ===
In an AllMusic summary of Lollipop, the lyrics were described as "goofball surrealism" and "alternating tall tales with weed-fueled philosophizing".

== Name ==
Curt Kirkwood remarked in a 2011 interview with AV Club that the decision to name the record Lollipop was brought about by its power-pop sound, further commenting "this counts as, you know, “pop-candy" for us".

== Reception ==
Professional ratings
Review scores
Source	Rating
AllMusic	3.5/5 stars
Pitchfork Media	link
Slant Magazine	2.5/5 stars

Based on 12 reviews, Metacritic assigned Lollipop a score of 71, indicating "generally favorable reviews".

Mark Deming of AllMusic described Lollipop as "flawed but interesting enough to confirm there's still life left in this band" which would hopefully "document in a more satisfying manner" on the next album.

Slant Magazine gave a mixed 2 and a half-out-of-5 star review of Lollipop, summarizing that the record "sounds a little tired".

== Track listing ==
All songs by Curt Kirkwood.

1. "Incomplete" – 4:09
2. "Orange" – 4:11
3. "Shave It" – 4:18
4. "Baby Don't" – 3:11
5. "Hour of the Idiot" – 3:35
6. "Lantern" – 3:34
7. "Town" – 3:20
8. "Damn Thing" – 3:44
9. "Amazing" – 4:49
10. "Way That It Are" – 3:28
11. "Vile" – 4:42
12. "The Spider and the Spaceship" – 3:29

== Personnel ==
- Curt Kirkwood – vocals, guitars
- Cris Kirkwood – vocals, bass guitar
- Shandon Sahm – drums
