= Rise to Your Knees =

Studio album by Meat Puppets
- Released: June 18, 2007
- Recorded: 2006–07
- Genre: Alternative rock
- Length: 67:30
- Label: Anodyne
- Producer: Curt Kirkwood

Meat Puppets chronology
Classic Puppets (2004)	Rise to Your Knees (2007)	Sewn Together (2009)

Rise to Your Knees is the Meat Puppets' eleventh full-length studio album, released on June 18, 2007, digitally, and physically on July 17, 2007. Not only was it their first studio release since 2000's Golden Lies, it was also their first to feature the original bassist Cris Kirkwood since his departure after the release of 1995's No Joke!. The album was given a one-month advance release on the iTunes Store and eMusic.

An earlier version of "Enemy Love Song" was available for download on Curt Kirkwood's official website in 2005 prior to the release of his solo album Snow. It was removed after the album was released. In addition to "Enemy Love Song", "New Leaf" previously appeared on the 2004 compilation album Classic Puppets, this version being recorded by the Golden Lies-era lineup.

== Reception ==
Based on 14 reviews, Metacritic assigned the album a rating of 65, indicating "generally favorable reviews".

Professional ratings
Review scores
Source	Rating
AllMusic	link
The A.V. Club	B link
Robert Christgau	link
Pitchfork Media	6.5/10 link
Rolling Stone	link
Spin	link
The Washington Post	(favorable) link

== Track listing ==
All songs written by Curt Kirkwood.

1. "Fly Like the Wind" - 5:31
2. "On the Rise" - 4:01
3. "Radio Moth" - 3:44
4. "Tiny Kingdom" - 5:04
5. "Enemy Love Song" - 3:24
6. "Spit" - 4:20
7. "Island" - 3:51
8. "Vultures" - 4:09
9. "Stone Eyes" - 3:59
10. "This Song" - 4:22
11. "New Leaf" - 3:57
12. "Disappear" - 4:18
13. "The Ship" - 4:17
14. "Ice" - 6:11
15. "Light the Fire" - 6:22

== Personnel ==
- Curt Kirkwood - vocals, guitars, keyboards
- Cris Kirkwood - bass guitar, vocals, keyboards, guitjo
- Ted Marcus - drums
- Stuart Sullivan - Wurlitzer solo on "Enemy Love Song"
- Frenchy Smith - hypnosis guitar on "Light the Fire"
