= Dusty Notes =

Studio album by Meat Puppets
- Released: March 8, 2019
- Recorded: 2018
- Genres: Alternative rock; country rock; psychedelic rock
- Length: 39:58
- Label: Megaforce

Meat Puppets chronology
Rat Farm (2013)	Dusty Notes (2019)

Singles from Dusty Notes
- 1. "Warranty" Released: 2018; 2. "Nine Pins" Released: 2019; 3. "Sea of Heartbreak" Released: 2019

Dusty Notes is the fifteenth studio album by American rock band Meat Puppets. The album was released on March 8, 2019, by Megaforce Records. It is the Meat Puppets' first album to feature rhythm guitarist Elmo Kirkwood, son of Meat Puppets' frontman Curt Kirkwood. It is also the Meat Puppets' first album to feature keyboardist Ron Stabinsky as an official member after previously touring with the band. Dusty Notes also features the return of original drummer Derrick Bostrom after 12 years.

== Musical style ==
Dusty Notes has been described by MXDWN as incorporating "alt-rock, psychedelic and country rock" aspects.

== Critical reception ==
Professional ratings
Aggregate scores
Source	Rating
Metacritic	75/100
Review scores
Source	Rating
AllMusic	3.5/5 stars
Pitchfork	7.2/10
PopMatters	8/10
Slant Magazine	3.5/5 stars

Dusty Notes was met with some positive reception. AllMusic's Mark Deming remarked that the album embodies "the best qualities of their more mature work", proclaiming it "a pleasing and well-crafted set" that reminds listeners that the band are "still vital and productive".

Caitlin Wills of MXDWN opined that the record's collection of songs were "as unique as they are beautiful".

== Track listing ==
All tracks are written by Curt Kirkwood, except where noted.

No.	Title	Writer(s)	Length
1.	"Warranty"		3:58
2.	"Nine Pins"		4:04
3.	"On"		3:22
4.	"Unfrozen Memory"		4:23
5.	"Dusty Notes"		3:45
6.	"The Great Awakening"		5:14
7.	"Sea of Heartbreak"	Hal David, Paul Hampton	2:49
8.	"Nightcap"		4:35
9.	"Vampyr's Winged Fantasy"		3:39
10.	"Outflow"		4:09

== Chart ==
Chart (2019)	Peak position
US Top Alternative Albums (Billboard)	19
US Top Rock Albums (Billboard)	39

== Personnel ==
All personnel credits for Dusty Notes are adapted from the album's liner notes, except where noted.

Meat Puppets

- Curt Kirkwood – guitar, vocals; thumb piano, percussion; arrangements
- Cris Kirkwood – bass, vocals; banjo
- Elmo Kirkwood – guitar, vocals
- Ron Stabinsky – keyboards
- Derrick Bostrom – drums, percussion

Technical personnel

- Meat Puppets – production
- Jeremy Parker – production, recording, mixing
- Josiah Rodriguez – assistant engineer
- Dan Shile – mastering
- Sam Hundley – art and design
