= Snow (Curt Kirkwood album) =

Studio album by Curt Kirkwood
- Released: October 2005
- Genre: Rock
- Length: 38:02
- Label: Little Dog Records
- Producer: Pete Anderson

Snow is the first solo album by Curt Kirkwood of the alternative rock band Meat Puppets, released in 2005. In his solo career, short though it was, he has pursued a more countrified aspect of his music. "Golden Lies" was originally written as the title track for the previous Meat Puppets album, however, it was ironically excluded. The album was recorded in only 20 days.

The album's title track was incorporated into the Meat Puppets' setlist upon their reunion tour in 2006.

Professional ratings
Review scores
Source	Rating
Allmusic	link

== Track listing ==
All songs composed by Curt Kirkwood, except where noted.

1. "Golden Lies" - 4:20
2. "Snow" - 2:44
3. "Beautiful Weapon" - 2:57
4. "Box of Limes" - 4:07
5. "Gold" - 4:10
6. "Here Comes Forever" - 3:30
7. "Lightbulb" - 4:01
8. "Movin' On" - 3:08
9. "In Bone" - 5:01
10. "Circles" - 3:57

== Personnel ==
- Pete Anderson - producer, acoustic guitar, mandolin, twelve-string electric guitar, bass guitar, percussion, ambient electric guitar, Weissemborn
- Bob Bernstein - pedal steel
- Jonathon Clark - harmony vocals
- Josh Day - drums on "Golden Lies", "Beautiful Weapon" and "Lightbulb"
- Rob Douglas - bass guitar on "Golden Lies" and "Beautiful Weapon"
- Dominic Genova - upright bass
- Curt Kirkwood - vocals, acoustic and electric guitars, baritone electric guitar, bass guitar on "Snow", "Movin' On", "In Bone" and "Circles"
- Michael Murphy - Hammond B-3, clavinet, piano, chamberlin, mellotron
- Kevin Sepriano - electric guitar on "Lightbulb"
- Lee Thornburg - trumpet
