= Golden Lies =

Studio album by Meat Puppets
- Released: September 26, 2000
- Genre: Hard rock
- Length: 58:36
- Label: Breaking/Atlantic
- Producer: Curt Kirkwood, John Plymale

Meat Puppets chronology
You Love Me (EP) (1999)	Golden Lies (2000)	Live (2002)

Singles from Golden Lies
- 1. "Armed and Stupid" Released: 2000

Golden Lies is a 2000 album by the Meat Puppets. After the You Love Me EP, in 1999, Golden Lies was the second (and final) studio release from the second line-up of the band. Although Derrick Bostrom and Cris Kirkwood do not appear on the album, they were still considered members of the Meat Puppets. The album is dedicated to Doug Sahm.

== Production ==
Golden Lies was recorded in Austin, Texas, where Curt Kirkwood had moved at the suggestion of Puppets touring guitarist Kyle Ellison. Kirkwood produced the album, his first solo production job in many years. The frontman found making the album as a four-piece to be less confining, and was inspired to try new recording approaches.

Outtakes from the album later formed the basis for Kirkwood's solo album.

== Critical reception ==
Professional ratings
Aggregate scores
Source	Rating
Metacritic	60/100
Review scores
Source	Rating
AllMusic	3/5 stars
The Encyclopedia of Popular Music	2/5 stars
Los Angeles Times	2.5/4 stars
Pitchfork	4.3/10
Portland Press Herald	C+
Rolling Stone	2.5/5 stars

Al Shipley of Pitchfork was largely dismissive of the record, describing the album as settling "into a series of unremarkable mid-tempo hard rock tunes," describing the song "Hercules" in particular to be a "clear sign that something is terribly wrong." The Austin Chronicle called the album "a compelling curiosity," writing that it "fits the Meat Puppets' canon nicely, because often enough, it doesn't fit at all." The Morning Call wrote that "although there's enough dyspepsia to please Pepto Bismol wholesalers and Pink Floyd fans around the world, the arbitrary absurdist lyrics keep the angst from etching anything in acid."

The Riverfront Times called the songs "dense desert rock, way too polished for their own good but still containing enough texture and momentum to make it an interesting listen." CMJ New Music Monthly deemed the album "a triumphant trip through the remnants of Kirkwood's brain." The Record called the songs "eclectic, quirky, and tuneful."

== Track listing ==
All songs written by Curt Kirkwood, unless otherwise noted.

1. "Intro" – 0:51 (Kirkwood, Kyle Ellison)
2. "Armed and Stupid" – 3:21
3. "I Quit" – 3:01
4. "Lamp" – 5:53
5. "Hercules" – 3:34
6. "Batwing" – 3:08
7. "Take Off Your Clothes" – 4:00 (Kirkwood, Kyle Ellison)
8. "You Love Me" – 3:51 (Kirkwood, Kyle Ellison, Andrew Duplantis)
9. "Pieces of Me" – 3:46
10. "Push the Button" – 4:52
11. "Tarantula" – 4:05
12. "Endless Wave" – 4:30
13. "Wipeout" – 3:54
14. "Fatboy/Fat/Requiem" – 9:50 (Kirkwood, Kyle Ellison)
