= Out My Way =

EP by Meat Puppets
- Released: 1986
- Recorded: March 1986
- Studio: Chaton (Phoenix, AZ)
- Genre: Alternative rock
- Length: 25:49 (original); 54:12 (reissue)
- Label: SST
- Producers: Meat Puppets, Steven Escallier

Meat Puppets chronology
Up on the Sun (1985)	Out My Way (1986)	Mirage (1987)

Out My Way is the second EP by the American band Meat Puppets, released in 1986 by SST Records. The EP was reissued in 1999 by Rykodisc, with additional bonus tracks.

The album features a more hard rock-oriented compared to the band's previous releases. Critics and listeners say that the sound is similar to the southern/hard rock stylings of ZZ Top.

== Background ==
The cover art is by Curt Kirkwood. The EP was recorded and released while Curt was recovering from a broken finger.

== Critical reception ==
Professional ratings
Review scores
Source	Rating
AllMusic	4/5 stars
Robert Christgau	B+
MusicHound Rock: The Essential Album Guide	2/5 stars
The Rolling Stone Album Guide	2.5/5 stars
Spin Alternative Record Guide	6/10

AllMusic wrote that "the EP showed that the Puppets were moving on from their early punk sound to a more traditional rock direction." Robert Christgau called the EP "a departure, toward a less spacy, more bottomy hardcore-gone-folkloric." Trouser Press praised "an utterly crazed raveup of 'Good Golly Miss Molly,'” writing that it "merely caps off a diverse collection of occasionally funky, occasionally psychedelic, occasionally countryfied rock tunes."

== Track listing ==
All songs written by Curt Kirkwood, unless otherwise noted.

Original album

1. "She's Hot" (Curt Kirkwood, Cris Kirkwood) – 4:05
2. "Out My Way" – 4:47
3. "Other Kinds of Love" (Curt Kirkwood, Cris Kirkwood) – 4:22
4. "Not Swimming Ground" (Curt Kirkwood, Cris Kirkwood) – 4:07
5. "Mountain Line" – 4:20
6. "Good Golly Miss Molly" (Robert "Bumps" Blackwell, John Marascalco) – 4:08

CD reissue bonus tracks

7. "I Just Want to Make Love to You" (Willie Dixon) – 3:55
8. "On the Move" – 3:50
9. "Burn the Honky Tonk Down" (Wayne Kemp) – 1:59
10. "Boyhood Home" – 3:17
11. "Backwards Drums" – 4:20
12. "Everything Is Green" – 8:39
13. "Other Kinds of Love" (Demo Version) – 0:52
