= Meat Puppets (album) =

Studio album by Meat Puppets
- Released: 1982
- Recorded: November 1981
- Studios: Unicorn, Hollywood, California
- Genres: Hardcore punk; hardcore thrash
- Length: 21:29
- Label: SST (009)

Meat Puppets chronology
In a Car (EP) (1981)	Meat Puppets (1982)	Meat Puppets II (1984)

Meat Puppets is the debut studio album by American rock band Meat Puppets, released in 1982 by SST Records. In 1999, Rykodisc re-issued the album, which included their debut EP In a Car (1981), 13 bonus tracks, and various other media.

In the 2012 book, Too High to Die: Meet the Meat Puppets by Greg Prato, an entire chapter is dedicated to Soundgarden guitarist Kim Thayil explaining why Meat Puppets is one of his favorite all-time albums.

== Background ==
Meat Puppets was formed from the ashes of the band Atomic Bomb Club, which included drummer Derrick Bostrom, guitarist Jack Knetzger, and bassist Cris Kirkwood. After the band dissolved, Knetzger, Kirkwood, and his younger brother Curt would form Meat Puppets. Eventually, after gaining the attention of SST records, they would sign with the label and record their first album.

== Recording ==
All the songs on the original album were recorded and engineered in November 1981, before being mixed in 1982. There are very few overdubs on the album, and many of the tracks are first takes. The sound quality is rather poor; there is noticeable fuzz in the background of the music. The band opted for this because they felt more comfortable recording live with only a few microphones rather than employing conventional studio separation techniques.

The 1999 Rykodisc re-issue features 13 other bonus tracks, their debut extended play (EP) In a Car, and a video clip of the band performing "Walking Boss" live.

== Music ==
Unlike the band's later releases, Meat Puppets features a hardcore punk sound. Stephen Thomas Erlewine of AllMusic called Meat Puppets a "full-on punk record". In 1999, Curt Kirkwood stated, "The first [album] was our LSD record. We were three days in the studio, and we tripped the whole time. And it was really cool, and really trying, too, because we went insane." The original pressing of the 12" album is engineered to be played back at 45 rpm.

== Reception ==
Professional ratings
Review scores
Source	Rating
AllMusic	3/5 stars
Robert Christgau	B
The Wire	(Favorable)

The album has generally been received positively. Robert Christgau wrote, "These Phoenix boys not only realize L.A. punk's no-wave proclivities in brief, doomy noise songs that sound like DNA meeting the Marx Brothers, they cover 'Tumblin' Tumbleweeds.'"

Writing for Allmusic, Greg Prato would write, "Although the Meat Puppets would later become best known for their intriguing blend of country, punk, rock, folk, psychedelia, and whatever else they could toss in their musical blender, the trio's 1982 self-titled full-length debut was a furious hardcore album. Totally ferocious and red hot, the album rarely lets up on its full-throttle attack."

== Track listing ==
All tracks are written by Meat Puppets (Curt Kirkwood, Cris Kirkwood, and Derrick Bostrom) except where noted.

No.	Title	Writer(s)	Length
1.	"Reward"		1:11
2.	"Love Offering"		1:28
3.	"Blue-Green God"		1:22
4.	"Walking Boss"	Doc Watson	2:52
5.	"Melons Rising"		0:53
6.	"Saturday Morning"		1:30
7.	"Our Friends"		2:11
8.	"Tumbling Tumbleweeds"	Bob Nolan	2:02
9.	"Milo, Sorghum, and Maize"		2:15
10.	"Meat Puppets"		1:38
11.	"Playing Dead"		1:28
12.	"Litterbox"		0:50
13.	"Electromud"		0:47
14.	"The Gold Mine"		1:02

1999 CD bonus tracks
No.	Title	Writer(s)	Length
15.	"In a Car"		1:21
16.	"Big House"		1:07
17.	"Dolphin Field"		1:09
18.	"Out in the Gardener"		1:04
19.	"Foreign Lawns"		0:37
20.	"Meat Puppets"		1:33
21.	"Everybody's Talking"	Fred Neil
22.	Untitled		2:42
23.	"H-Elenore"	C. Kirkwood	1:39
24.	"Hair (Monitor)"		1:26
25.	"I Got a Right"	Iggy Pop	2:40
26.	"I Am a Child"	Neil Young	2:14
27.	"Franklin's Tower"	Jerry Garcia, Robert Hunter, Bill Kreutzmann	4:52
28.	"Milo Sorghum & Maize"		1:32
29.	"Electromud"		0:45
30.	"Love Offering"		1:03
31.	"Saturday Morning"		1:11
32.	"Magic Toy Missing (Curt Kirkwood)"		1:28
33.	"Unpleasant"	C. Kirkwood, Derrick Bostrom	1:02

- Tracks 15–19 are from the In a Car EP.

== Personnel ==
Meat Puppets

- Curt Kirkwood – guitar, vocals
- Cris Kirkwood – bass, vocals
- Derrick Bostrom – drums

with:

- Steve Thompson – keyboards on "Hair"

Production and other credits

- Engineer – Spot (Except tracks 15–19, 23 & 27–32)
- Engineer (tracks 15–19, 23) – Ed Barger
- Engineer (tracks 27–32) – ?
- Mixing – Spot, except Laurie O'Connell & Ed Barger ("The Gold Mine") and Ed Barger (tracks 15–19, 23)
- Cover art – Curt Kirkwood and Derrick Bostrom
