= In a Car =

EP by Meat Puppets
- Released: 1981
- Recorded: June 4, 1981
- Genre: Hardcore punk
- Length: 5:18
- Labels: 1981: World Imitation; 1985: SST
- Producer: Meat Puppets

Meat Puppets chronology
In a Car (1981)	Meat Puppets (1982)

In a Car is the debut EP by the American rock band Meat Puppets, released in 1981 by World Imitation Records. In 1985, In a Car was re-released by SST Records. In 1999, Rykodisc released the EP with the re-issue of their debut album, Meat Puppets (1982).

== Background ==
It was recorded in Silver Lake studio in Los Angeles on June 4, 1981, with Ed Barger (who had engineered several early Devo singles). It was recorded in about 12 hours.

In a Car was originally issued on L.A. art collective/record label World Imitation Records as a 5-track 7-inch EP. While the original EP contained only five tracks, six tracks were recorded at the session, including the song "Hair," written by fellow World Imitation band Monitor. It was released as a lone Meat Puppets track on the first Monitor LP on World Imitation records.

== Critical reception ==
Professional ratings
Review scores
Source	Rating
AllMusic	2/5 stars
Spin Alternative Record Guide	6/10

Trouser Press called the recording "shrieking thrash-punk and unrealized avant-guitar ambitions." Spin called it "tunefully abrasive."

== Track listing ==
All songs written by Meat Puppets.

1. "In a Car" – 1:21
2. "Big House" – 1:07
3. "Dolphin Field" – 1:09
4. "Out in the Gardener" – 1:04
5. "Foreign Lawns" – 0:37
