= Ted Marcus =

American drummer

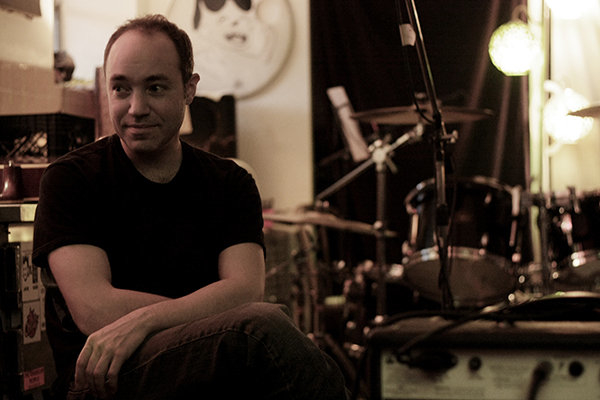

Background information
- Occupations: Drummer / Sound Engineer
- Instruments: Drums

Ted Marcus is an American drummer formerly of the Meat Puppets.

Marcus replaced original drummer Derrick Bostrom, for the band's 2006 reunion. He was present on their 2007 reunion album Rise to Your Knees and its follow-up, Sewn Together. He left the band in late 2009.

In addition to drumming, Marcus was senior audio engineer and sound designer for MTV, mixed the Emmy Award-winning short film StandFast: Trip to Sudan, and mixed and did sound design for the film Pitch, which was accepted at the Cannes Film Festival. Marcus was an audio engineer and sound designer for National Recording Studios and Clack/Hothead Studios, both of New York City. He served as senior sound designer and mix engineer for the design agency Ultrabland, an Emmy Award-winning production house in New York City. and is proprietor of TM Audio, LLC (also of New York). In 2016, Marcus joined SuperExploder, a custom designed audio facility in NYC's Chelsea neighborhood.

In addition to playing with the Meat Puppets, Marcus has also recorded and performed with the NYC bands Absolute Shower, Luxury (Chapell), the Liz Skillman Group, and Slyboots.
