= Alex Coletti =

American television producer

Alex Coletti is an executive producer and director. He is a Brooklyn native and graduate of Brooklyn College, and formerly worked for MTV Networks. He now heads Alex Coletti Productions. Coletti produced MTV's Unplugged series, was a five-time producer of the VMAs, and served as a producer for Super Bowl XXXV and Super Bowl XXXVIII halftime shows.

== Work ==
Coletti was in charge of filming Celtic Woman: Songs from the Heart at the Powerscourt Estate in Ireland in 2009 for PBS. He was EP and Director of the Rock and Roll Hall of Fame Induction Ceremony for HBO, from 2015 to 2019, and producer of the Audible series Words & Music (2020). He was director of The Tonight Show Starring Jimmy Fallon for most of 2021, and executive producer of One Last Time: An Evening with Tony Bennett and Lady Gaga for CBS/Paramount+.

Coletti has also directed many concert performances featuring, among others, Lady Gaga, Kanye West, Ed Sheeran, and Coldplay.

He has been nominated for 3 Emmy Awards for his work with Unplugged.
