= Meat Puppets =

American rock band

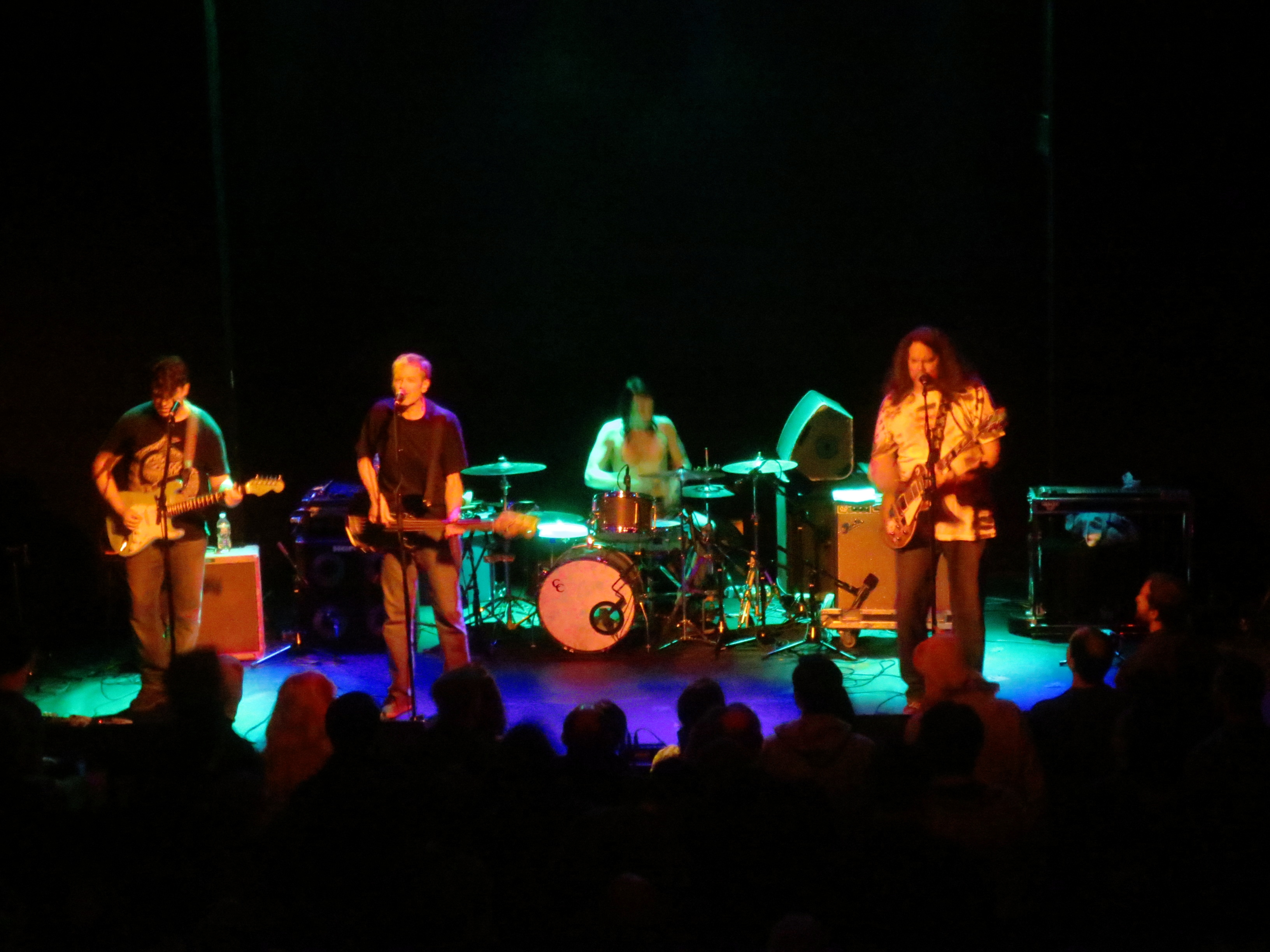
- Meat Puppets performing in 2014

Background information
- Origin: Phoenix, Arizona, U.S.
- Genres: Alternative rock; cowpunk; psychedelia; alternative country; hardcore punk (early)
- Works: Discography
- Years active: 1980–1996; 1999–2002; 2006–present
- Labels: SST; London; Atlantic; Rykodisc; Anodyne; Megaforce; DC-Jam
- Members: Curt Kirkwood; Cris Kirkwood; Derrick Bostrom; Elmo Kirkwood; Ron Stabinsky
- Past members: Shandon Sahm; Kyle Ellison; Andrew Duplantis; Troy Meiss (touring member); Ted Marcus
- Website: www.themeatpuppets.com

The Meat Puppets are an American rock band formed in January 1980 in Phoenix, Arizona. The group's original lineup was Curt Kirkwood (guitar/vocals), his brother Cris Kirkwood (bass guitar/vocals), and Derrick Bostrom (drums). The Kirkwood brothers met Bostrom while attending Brophy Prep High School in Phoenix. The three then moved to Tempe, Arizona, where the Kirkwood brothers purchased two adjacent houses, one of which had a shed in the back where they regularly practiced.

Meat Puppets started as a punk rock band, but like most of their labelmates on SST Records, established their own unique style, blending punk with country and psychedelic rock, and featuring Curt's warbling vocals. The band later gained significant exposure when the Kirkwood brothers served as guest musicians on Nirvana's MTV Unplugged performance in 1993 for three Meat Puppets songs sung by fan Kurt Cobain. The band's eighth studio album Too High to Die (1994) was their most successful release and featured their best-known hit "Backwater". The band broke up twice, in 1996 and 2002, but reunited again in 2006.

== History ==
=== Early career (1980–1990) ===
In the late 1970s, drummer Derrick Bostrom played with guitarist Jack Knetzger in a band called Atomic Bomb Club, which began as a duo, but would come to include bassist Cris Kirkwood. The band played a few local shows and recorded some demos, but began to dissolve quickly thereafter. Derrick and Cris began rehearsing together with Cris' brother Curt Kirkwood by learning songs from Bostrom's collection of punk rock 45s. After briefly toying with the name The Bastions of Immaturity, they settled on the name Meat Puppets in June, 1980 after a song by Curt of the same name which appears on their first album. Their earliest EP In a Car was made entirely of short hardcore punk with goofy lyrics, and attracted the attention of Joe Carducci as he was starting to work with legendary punk label SST Records. Carducci suggested they sign with the label, and Meat Puppets released their first album Meat Puppets in 1982, which among several new originals and a pair of heavily skewed Doc Watson and Bob Nolan covers, featured the songs "The Gold Mine" and "Melons Rising", two tunes Derrick and Cris originally had written and performed as Atomic Bomb Club previously. Years later, when the Meat Puppets reissued all of their albums in 1999, the five songs on In A Car would be combined with their debut album.

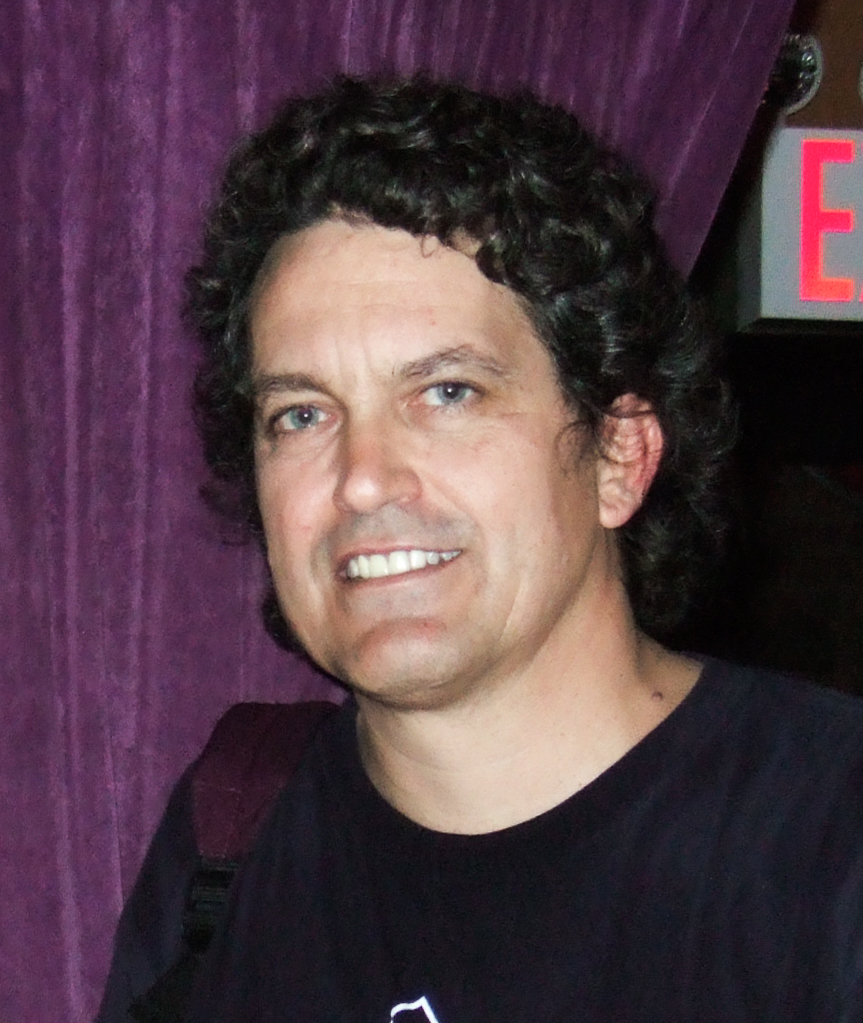
Curt Kirkwood

By the release of 1984's Meat Puppets II, the bandmembers "were so sick of the hardcore thing," according to Bostrom. "We were really into pissing off the crowd." Here, the band experimented with acid rock and country and western sounds, while still retaining some punk influence on the tracks "Split Myself in Two" and "New Gods". This album contains some of the band's best known songs, such as "Lake of Fire" and "Plateau". While the album had been recorded in early 1983, the album's release was delayed for a year by SST. Meat Puppets II turned the band into one of the leading bands on SST Records, and along with the Violent Femmes, the Gun Club and others, helped establish the genre called "cow punk".

Meat Puppets II was followed by 1985's Up on the Sun. The album's psychedelic sound resembled the folk-rock of the Grateful Dead, while the songs still retained hardcore influences in the lengths of the songs and the tempos. Examples of this new style are the self-titled track, "Enchanted Porkfist" and "Swimming Ground". Up On The Sun featured the Kirkwood brothers harmonizing their vocals for the first time. These two albums were mainstays of college and independent radio at that time.

During the rest of the 1980s, Meat Puppets remained on SST and released a series of albums while touring relentlessly. Between tours they would regularly play small shows in bars around the Phoenix area such as The Mason Jar (now The Rebel Lounge) and The Sun Club in Tempe. After the release of the hard-rock styled Out My Way EP in 1986, however, the band was briefly sidelined by an accident when Curt's finger was broken after being slammed in their touring van's door. The accident delayed the band's next album, the even more psychedelic Mirage, until the next year. The final result included synthesizers and electronic drums. The tour for Mirage lasted less than 6 months, as the band found it difficult to recreate many of this album's songs in a concert atmosphere.

Their next album, the ZZ-Top inspired Huevos, came out less than six months afterward, in late summer of 1987. These recordings were completed in only a matter of days, and along with a few drawings and one of Curt's paintings taken from the wall to serve as cover art (a dish of three boiled eggs, a green pepper, and a bottle of Tabasco sauce), were all sent to SST shortly before the band returned to the road en route to their next gig. Curt revealed in an interview that one of the reasons for the album being called Huevos (meaning 'eggs' in Spanish) was because of the predominance of first-takers on the record, as similarly eggs can only be used once.

Monsters was released in 1989, featuring new elements to their sound with extended jams (such as "Touchdown King" and "Flight of the Fire Weasel") and heavy metal ("Attacked by Monsters"). This album was mostly motivated by the Meat Puppets' desire to attract the attention of a major label, as they were becoming frustrated with SST Records by this time.

=== Major label career (1991–1995) ===
As numerous bands from the seminal SST label and other kindred punk-oriented indies had before them, Meat Puppets grappled with the decision to switch to a major label. Two years after their final studio recording for SST, 1989's Monsters, the trio released its major-label debut, Forbidden Places, on the indie-friendly London Records. The band chose London Records because it was the first label that ZZ Top, one of their favorite bands, was signed to.

Forbidden Places combined many elements of the band's sounds over the years (cowpunk, psychedelia, riffy heavier rock) while some songs had a more laid back early alternative sound. Songs include "Sam" and "Whirlpool", and the title track.

In 1992 following his departure from the Red Hot Chili Peppers, guitarist John Frusciante auditioned for the band. Cris Kirkwood stated "He showed up with his guitar out of its case and barefoot. We were on a major label then, we just got signed, and those guys had blown up to where they were at and John needed to get out. John gets to our pad and we started getting ready to play and I said, 'You want to use my tuner?' He said, 'No, I'll bend it in.' It was so far out. Then we jammed but it didn't come to anything. Maybe he wasn't in the right place and we were a tight little unit. It just didn't quite happen but it could have worked." In late 1993, Meat Puppets achieved mainstream popularity when Nirvana's Kurt Cobain, who became a fan after seeing them open for Black Flag in the 1980s, invited Cris and Curt to join him on MTV Unplugged for acoustic performances of "Plateau", "Oh Me" and "Lake of Fire" (all originally from Meat Puppets II). The resulting album, MTV Unplugged in New York, served as a swan song for Nirvana, as Cobain died less than five months after the concert. "Lake of Fire" became a cult favorite for its vocal performance from Cobain. Subsequently, the Nirvana exposure and the strength of the single "Backwater" (their highest-charting single) helped lift Meat Puppets to new commercial heights. The band's studio return was 1994's Too High to Die, produced by Butthole Surfers guitarist Paul Leary. The album featured "Backwater", which reached number 47 on the Billboard Hot 100, and a hidden-track update of "Lake of Fire". This album features a more straightforward alternative rock style, with occasional moments of pop, country and neo-psychedelic moments. Too High To Die earned the band a gold record (500,000 sold), outselling their previous records combined.

1995's No Joke! was the final album recorded by the original Meat Puppets lineup. Stylistically it is very similar to Too High to Die, although much heavier and with darker lyrics. Examples of this are the single "Scum" and "Eyeball", although the band's usual laid-back style is still heard on tracks like "Chemical Garden". Though the band's drug use had long included cocaine, heroin, LSD and many others, Cris' use of heroin and crack cocaine became so bad he rarely left his house except to obtain more drugs. At least two people (including his wife and one of his best friends) died of overdoses at his house in Tempe, AZ during this time. The Kirkwood brothers had always had a legendary appetite for illegal substances and during the tour to support Too High To Die with Stone Temple Pilots, the easy availability of drugs was too much for Cris. When it was over, he was severely addicted to cocaine and heroin. When their record label discovered Cris' addictions, support for No Joke! was subsequently dropped and it was met with poor sales figures.

=== First hiatus and reunion (1996–2001) ===
Bostrom recorded a solo EP under the moniker Today's Sounds in 1996, and later on in 1999 took charge of re-issuing the Puppets' original seven records on Rykodisc as well as putting out their first live album, Live in Montana. Curt formed a new band in Austin, Texas called the Royal Neanderthal Orchestra, but they changed their name to Meat Puppets and released a promotional EP entitled You Love Me in 1999, Golden Lies in 2000 and Live in 2002. The line-up was Curt (voc/git), Kyle Ellison (voc/git), Andrew Duplantis (voc/bass) and Shandon Sahm (drums). Sahm's father was the legendary fiddler-singer-songwriter Doug Sahm of The Sir Douglas Quintet and Texas Tornados. The concluding track to Classic Puppets entitled "New Leaf" also dates from this incarnation of the band.

=== Break up (2002–2005) ===
Around 2002, Meat Puppets dissolved after Duplantis left the band. Curt went on to release albums with the groups Eyes Adrift and Volcano. In 2005, he released his first solo album entitled Snow.

Bassist Cris was arrested in December 2003 for attacking a security guard at the main post office in downtown Phoenix, Arizona with the guard's baton. The guard shot Kirkwood in the stomach at least twice during the melee, causing serious gunshot injuries requiring major surgery. Kirkwood was subsequently denied bail, the judge citing Kirkwood's previous drug arrests and probation violations. He eventually went to prison at the Arizona state prison in Florence, Arizona for felony assault. He was released in July 2005.

Derrick Bostrom began a web site for the band about six months before the original trio stopped working together. The site went through many different permutations before it was essentially mothballed in 2003. In late 2005, Bostrom revamped it, this time as a "blog" for his recollections and as a place to share pieces of Meat Puppets history.

=== Second reunion (2006–present) ===
On March 24, 2006, Curt Kirkwood polled fans at his MySpace page with a bulletin that asked: "Question for all ! Would the original line up of Meat Puppets interest anyone ? Feedback is good – do you want a reunion!?" The response from fans was overwhelmingly positive within a couple of hours, leading to speculation of a full-blown Meat Puppets reunion in the near future. However, a post made by Derrick Bostrom on the official Meat Puppets site dismissed the notion.

In April 2006, Billboard reported that the Kirkwood brothers would reunite as Meat Puppets without original drummer Derrick Bostrom. Although Primus drummer Tim Alexander was announced as Bostrom's replacement, the position was later filled by Ted Marcus. The new lineup recorded a new full-length album, Rise to Your Knees, in mid-to-late 2006. The album was released by Anodyne Records on July 17, 2007.

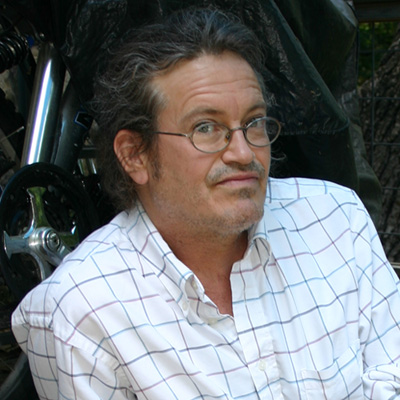
Cris Kirkwood

On January 20, 2007, Meat Puppets brothers performed two songs during an Army of Anyone concert, at La Zona Rosa in Austin, Texas. The first song was played with Curt Kirkwood and Cris Kirkwood along with Army of Anyone's Ray Luzier and Dean DeLeo. Then the second song was played with original members Curt and Cris Kirkwood and new Meat Puppets drummer Ted Marcus. This was in the middle of Army of Anyone's set, which they listed as Meat Puppet Theatre on the evening's set list. The band performed several new songs in March at the South by Southwest festival. On March 28, 2007, the band announced a West Coast tour through their MySpace page. This was the first tour with original bassist Cris in eleven years. The tour continued into the east coast and midwest later in 2007.

In 2008, they performed their classic second album live in its entirety at the ATP New York festival.

The band parted ways with Anodyne, signed to Megaforce and began recording new material in the winter of 2008. The resulting album, entitled Sewn Together, was released on May 12, 2009. In the summer of 2009 the band continued to tour across America. They appeared in Rochester, Minnesota outside in front of over 5,000 fans, after playing Summerfest in Milwaukee, Wisconsin the night prior. Meat Puppets performed at the 2009 Voodoo Music Experience in New Orleans over the Halloween weekend.

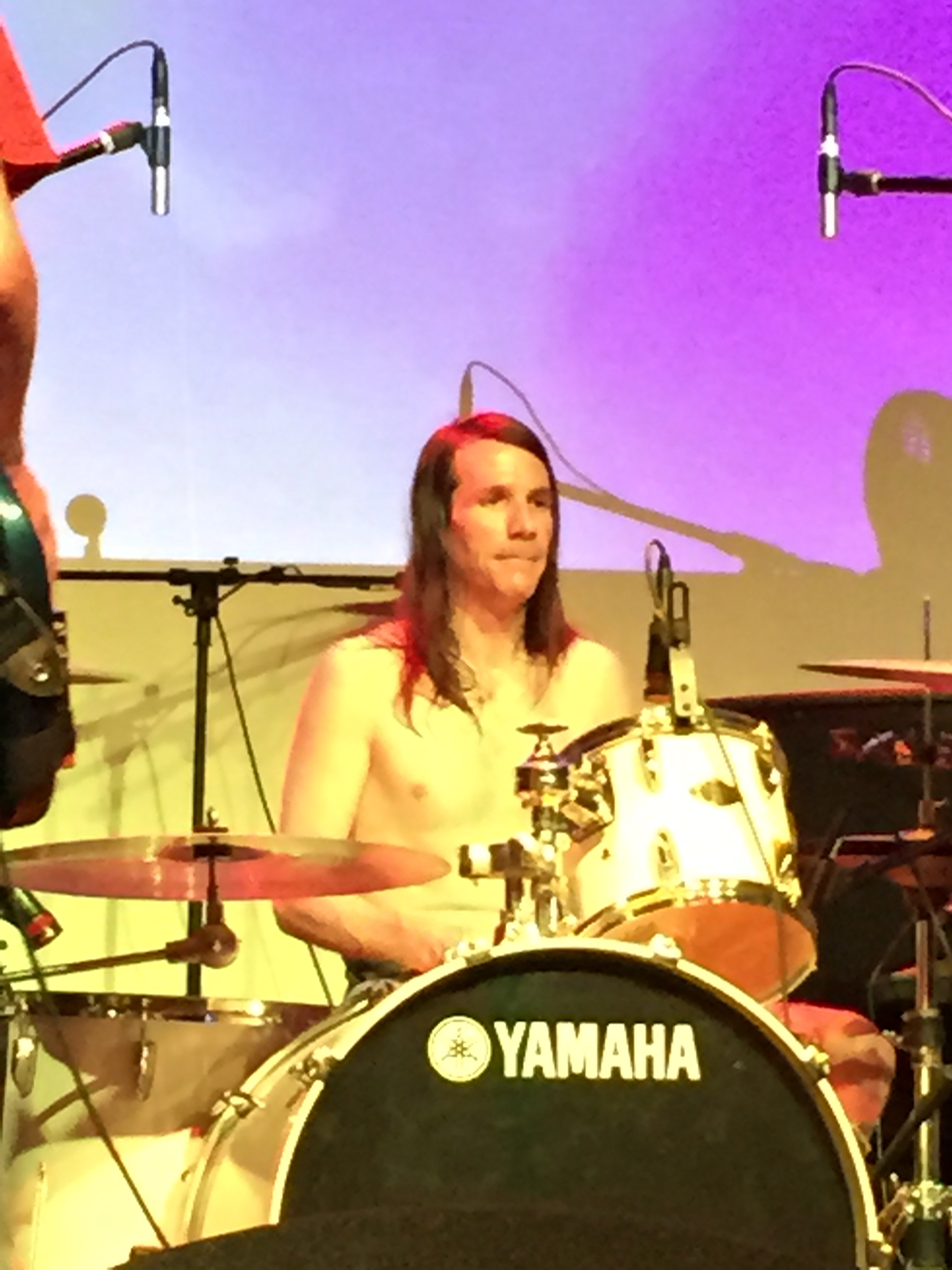
Shandon Sahm

As of November 2009, Shandon Sahm was back as the drummer in Meat Puppets, replacing Ted Marcus. The band was chosen by Animal Collective to perform the album Up on the Sun live in its entirety at the All Tomorrow's Parties festival that they curated in May 2011.

The band's thirteenth studio album, entitled Lollipop, was released on April 12, 2011. The Dandies supported Meat Puppets on all European dates in 2011.

Meat Puppets have played several gigs in their hometown since 2009, such as the Marquee show in June 2011 with Dead Confederate.

As of early 2011 Elmo Kirkwood, son of Curt Kirkwood and nephew of Cris Kirkwood, was touring regularly with the band playing rhythm guitar.

Meat Puppets also contributed to Spin magazine's exclusive album Newermind: A Tribute to Nirvana, playing Nirvana's "Smells Like Teen Spirit".

In June 2012, a book titled Too High to Die: Meet the Meat Puppets by author Greg Prato was released, which featured all-new interviews with band members past and present and friends of the band (including Peter Buck, Kim Thayil, Scott Asheton, Mike Watt, and Henry Rollins, among others), and covered the band's entire career.

In October 2012, it was announced that the group had just completed recording new songs. Rat Farm, the band's 14th album, was released in April 2013.

In March 2013, Meat Puppets opened for Dave Grohl's Sound City Players at the SXSW Festival in Austin, Texas.

In April 2014, Meat Puppets completed a tour with The Moistboyz, and in the summer of 2015, they toured with Soul Asylum.

The Meat Puppets were picked to open for an 11 show tour as support of The Dean Ween Group in October 2016 after Curt Kirkwood and drummer Chuck Treece contribute to The Deaner Album. Also the same year, Cris either produced and/or played with the following artists for Slope Records - The Exterminators, the Linecutters, and Sad Kid.

On August 17, 2017, original drummer Derrick Bostrom posted an update on his website derrickbostrom.net. He performed with Cris, Curt and Elmo Kirkwood at a concert honoring the Meat Puppets. It appears that, while Bostrom enjoyed himself, this was a one-off performance.

On July 8, 2018, it was confirmed that Bostrom had replaced Sahm as the drummer for the band, and that keyboardist Ron Stabinsky had joined.

The band released their 15th studio album, Dusty Notes, on March 8, 2019.

== Musical style and legacy ==
According to the Chicago Reader, Meat Puppets "were part of a crucial group of hardcore bands bucking the conventions of a genre that had quickly become codified." Pitchfork described the Meat Puppets' style as "warped psychedelic country music". Stephen Thomas Erlewine of AllMusic described the band's sound as "punk rock with a strong affection for '60s psychedelia and American roots music", noting that they were one of the first bands on SST Records to "drift away from the fractured but muscular punk-oriented sound that had been SST's initial trademark." He also noted Meat Puppets' longevity compared to many other bands on the SST Records roster during the mid-1980s, saying the band "[survived] where other bands fell apart."

In 1985, Steve Appleford of Daily Sundial described the band's sound as a "sonic allusion to the desert of our cinematic dreams," saying that the music is "pervaded by a sense of open space, haunted by the feeling of desolation an evocative of lonely reverie." He further assessed: "This music was not brought about by any calculation of genre development or fashion. It's much too personal, heartfelt, exquisitely vulnerable for that."

Musician Lou Barlow, member of the bands Dinosaur Jr. and Sebadoh, said, "Meat Puppets are the singularly most influential band on both Dinosaur Jr. and Sebadoh. I kick myself for not ever emphasizing this enough." Dinosaur Jr. frontman J Mascis recalled that listeners construed his band as "a Meat Puppets rip-off at first." In addition to Dinosaur Jr. and Sebadoh, Meat Puppets have been cited as an influence by numerous commercially successful rock bands, including Nirvana, Soundgarden, Pavement, Jawbreaker, and Sublime.

In 2014, Phoenix New Times named the band's self-titled debut album one of "The Most Influential Arizona Punk Records".

Meat Puppets were inducted into the Arizona Music & Entertainment Hall of Fame in 2017.

In 2025, The Phoenix Independent named the band's "I'm Not You" among its "Top 100 Greatest Songs Recorded in Arizona."

== Members ==
Current members

- Curt Kirkwood – lead vocals, guitar (1980–1996, 1999–2002, 2006–present)
- Cris Kirkwood – bass, backing vocals (1980–1996, 2006–present)
- Derrick Bostrom – drums (1980–1996, 2018–present)
- Elmo Kirkwood – guitar (2018–present) (touring member 2011–2017)
- Ron Stabinsky – keyboards (2018–present) (touring member 2017)

Former members

- Shandon Sahm – drums (1999–2002, 2009–2018)
- Andrew Duplantis – bass (1999–2002)
- Kyle Ellison – guitar (1999–2002)
- Ted Marcus – drums (2006–2009)

Former touring members

- Troy Meiss – guitar (1994)

Timeline

== Discography ==
- Meat Puppets (1982)
- Meat Puppets II (1984)
- Up on the Sun (1985)
- Mirage (1987)
- Huevos (1987)
- Monsters (1989)
- Forbidden Places (1991)
- Too High to Die (1994)
- No Joke! (1995)
- Golden Lies (2000)
- Rise to Your Knees (2007)
- Sewn Together (2009)
- Lollipop (2011)
- Rat Farm (2013)
- Dusty Notes (2019)

== See also ==
- List of alternative rock artists
- List of musicians in the second wave of punk music
