= Derrick Bostrom =

American musician

- Born: Derrick Edwin Bostrom; June 23, 1960 (age 65)
- Genres: Alternative, punk rock, psychedelic rock, country, heavy metal
- Occupations: Musician, drummer, songwriter
- Instrument: Drums
- Years active: 1980–present

Derrick Edwin Bostrom (born June 23, 1960) is an American musician. He is a founding member and current drummer of the band Meat Puppets.

Although Meat Puppets singer/guitarist Curt Kirkwood wrote the majority of the songs for the band, Bostrom has co-penned several tunes, including the majority of their self-titled debut. Bostrom remained a member until 1996 when the band effectively went on hiatus. Although Curt Kirkwood later revived the Meat Puppets, Bostrom had not performed with the band until August 17, 2017, when he reunited with the Kirkwood brothers for a ceremony, recording of Dusty Notes and the tour surrounding the album.

Bostrom remained somewhat active as a musician during the band's hiatus and his personal hiatus from music by releasing material under the name Today's Sounds (including the 1996 release, Songs Of Spiritual Uplift As Sung By Today's Sounds) as well as collaborating with Neil Hamburger and Cliff Sarde (on his Smoke N' Function project). Bostrom has also maintained the official Meat Puppets website since 1995 — and has continued to do so even when the band is inactive. Furthermore, he oversaw the Rykodisc reissue of the Meat Puppets' SST era albums, and was interviewed for the 2012 book, Too High to Die: Meet the Meat Puppets.

In 2006, when the Kirkwood brothers began playing together again, fans speculated if Bostrom would be involved in an upcoming reunion; however, he dismissed the notion in a post on the Meat Puppets' website. Ted Marcus became the band's drummer in 2007, succeeded by Shandon Sahm in 2010 before Bostrom re-joined in 2018.

Bostrom was extensively interviewed for the 2012 book, Too High to Die: Meet the Meat Puppets, and the 2020 book, BONZO: 30 Rock Drummers Remember the Legendary John Bonham., both by author Greg Prato.
