= Curt Kirkwood =

American musician (born 1959)

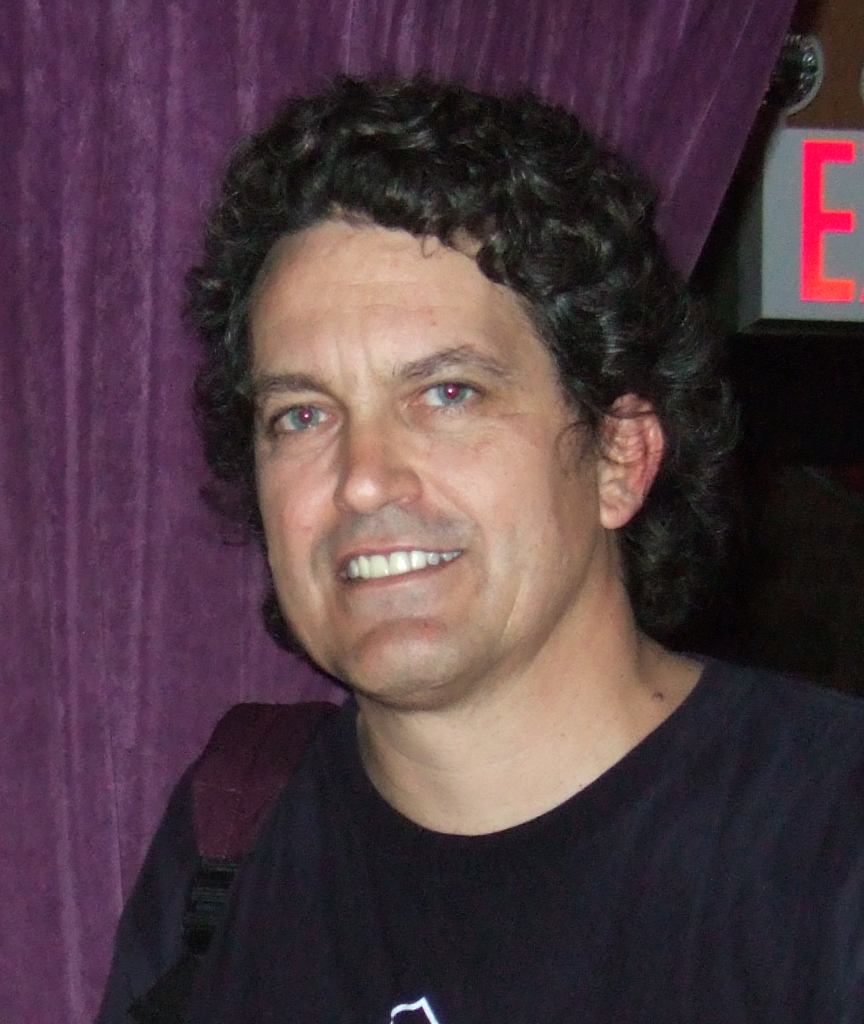
- Curt Kirkwood in 2006

Background information
- Born: Curtis Mathew Kirkwood; January 10, 1959 (age 67); Wichita Falls, Texas, US
- Origin: Phoenix, Arizona, US
- Genres: Alternative rock; hard rock; folk rock
- Occupations: Musician; singer; songwriter; artist
- Instruments: Guitar; vocals
- Years active: 1980–present
- Labels: SST; London; Atlantic; Rykodisc; Anodyne; Megaforce; Little Dog
- Website: themeatpuppets.com

Curtis Mathew Kirkwood (born January 10, 1959) is an American musician, best known as the guitarist, singer and primary songwriter for the alternative rock group Meat Puppets, and for playing with the rock band Nirvana on the live album MTV Unplugged in New York.

== Early life ==
His parents were Donald Dean Kirkwood (1935–2008), a member of the United States Air Force, and Vera Pearl Renstrom (1937–1996). Donald and Renstrom met at the University of Nebraska in Omaha. In 1958, shortly after Renstrom had learned she was pregnant with Curtis, she and Donald married and moved to Wichita Falls, Texas, where Curtis was born on January 10, 1959.

A year later, the family relocated to Amarillo, where Curtis's brother Cris was born. In 1964, Curtis required kidney surgery, so the family moved to Omaha. Soon after his surgery, his parents divorced. Kirkwood and his mother and brother moved to Acapulco, Mexico, where his grandfather had made a fortune in the hotel business.

Kirkwood's mother remarried. By his second year of school, they had moved to the Sunnyslope neighborhood of Phoenix, Arizona. Kirkwood spent the remainder of his childhood there, living with his mother and a succession of stepfathers.

== Career ==
In January 1980, Curt Kirkwood (guitar), his brother Cris (bass), and Derrick Bostrom (drums) formed the band Meat Puppets in Paradise Valley, Arizona. Over the next sixteen years, the band released ten albums. The trio went on hiatus in 1996 after a long career in which they were hailed as one of the premier and innovative indie bands, who also briefly achieved mainstream success in the early 1990s. As the group's lead vocalist and primary songwriter (including solely penning most of the band's best-known songs: "Plateau," "Oh, Me," "Lake of Fire," "Up on the Sun," "Backwater," etc.), Curt is the sole member of the original trio to have played in all of the band's incarnations since 1980.

He re-formed the Meat Puppets in 1999 with Kyle Ellison (guitar), and Andrew Duplantis (bass) and Shandon Sahm (drums) to complete one studio album, Golden Lies, released in 2000. The new lineup disbanded in 2002 after the departure of Duplantis. After the Meat Puppets, Kirkwood toured as a solo act before banding together with Nirvana bassist Krist Novoselic and Sublime drummer Bud Gaugh to form Eyes Adrift. They released a self-titled album in 2002 and toured the United States. After Novoselic's departure, Kirkwood and Gaugh formed another band, Volcano, which released a self-titled album in 2004 before Kirkwood decided to focus on his solo career. His first solo album Snow was released in October 2005.

He is also an artist and created the cover art for several Meat Puppets albums and merchandise, as well as for Stephen Beachy's novel The Whistling Song. In 2006, the Meat Puppets re-formed with Cris back on bass and drummers Ted Marcus and Shandon Sahm serving as replacements for Derrick Bostrom until he returned to the band in 2018. Since reforming, the band has released five new albums, Rise to Your Knees (2007), Sewn Together (2009), Lollipop (2011), Rat Farm (2013) and Dusty Notes (2019).

Kirkwood was extensively interviewed for the 2012 book, Too High to Die: Meet the Meat Puppets, by author Greg Prato.

== Personal life ==
Kirkwood is the grandson of Carl W. Renstrom, who was owner of Tip-Top Products and a multi-millionaire from Omaha, Nebraska.

== Discography ==
=== Nirvana ===
- MTV Unplugged in New York (1993)

=== Eyes Adrift ===
- Eyes Adrift (2002)

=== Volcano ===
- Volcano (2004)

=== Solo ===
- Snow (2005)

=== The Dean Ween Group ===
- The Deaner Album (2016)
