= Cris Kirkwood =

American musician (born 1960)

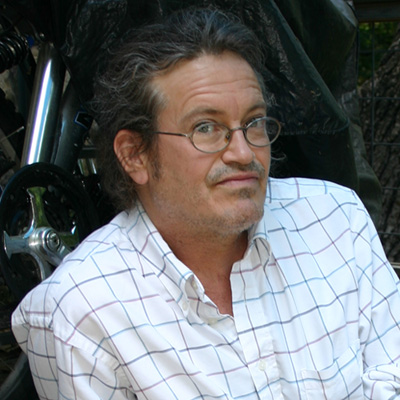
- Cris Kirkwood in 2007

Background information
- Born: October 22, 1960 (age 65)
- Genres: Alternative, punk rock
- Occupations: Musician, singer, songwriter
- Instrument: Bass guitar
- Years active: 1980–1995, 2006–present

Christopher Kirkwood (born October 22, 1960) is an American musician who is the bassist and a founding member of the Meat Puppets, an alternative punk rock band.

== Biography ==
Raised in the Sunnyslope neighborhood of Phoenix, Arizona, Cris took up the banjo after seeing Deliverance, moved on to guitar, and ultimately picked up the bass when he started playing together in bands with his older brother Curt. In 1980 the brothers and their friend Derrick Bostrom, a drummer, decided to form a band, which they eventually named the Meat Puppets.

Besides playing bass, Kirkwood's role in the band grew over the years, including singing and songwriting. The Meat Puppets songs that Cris has been credited with co-penning have included the majority of the group's self-titled debut, as well as "Maiden's Milk," "Animal Kingdom," "She's Hot," "Other Kinds of Love," "Not Swimming Ground," and "The Mighty Zero," "Paradise," "Bad Love," "Automatic Mojo," and "I Can't Be Counted On," while being solely credited for penning the tracks (which he also sang lead on) "Station," "Evil Love," "Cobbler," and "Inflatable."

Kirkwood's use of drugs began to spin out of control after the success of 1994's Too High to Die, and he developed a severe heroin addiction. Kirkwood retreated to his house in Tempe, Arizona, where he and his wife, Michelle Tardif, who was also an addict, lived in virtual isolation. Tardif eventually died of a drug-injection related infection in August 1998. After the release of the album No Joke! in 1995, Kirkwood's compulsive behavior during what was already a stressful time for the band led to the Meat Puppets entering a period of inactivity. Despite numerous interventions and rehab stays, Kirkwood remained addicted to narcotics for many years.

=== Imprisonment ===
In December 2003, Kirkwood got into an argument with a woman over a parking space at a post office in downtown Phoenix. A security guard got involved in the scuffle, which escalated when Kirkwood grabbed the guard's baton and began striking at him. The guard drew his handgun and shot Kirkwood in the back, resulting in his being hospitalized. In August 2004, Kirkwood pleaded guilty to assault with a deadly weapon and was sentenced to 21 months in prison.

While incarcerated at the Federal Correctional Institution in Phoenix, Kirkwood met Jerry Posin, who had been a drummer for Steppenwolf, and joined in Posin's exercise routine. The two eventually joined in jazz and other original music performances at the facility. Kirkwood's time in prison, which he said "was actually pretty tolerable", helped him kick his drug addiction cold turkey. However, no recordings of Kirkwood's jail band performances are known to exist. He served out his time and was released on July 7, 2005.

=== Return to the Meat Puppets ===
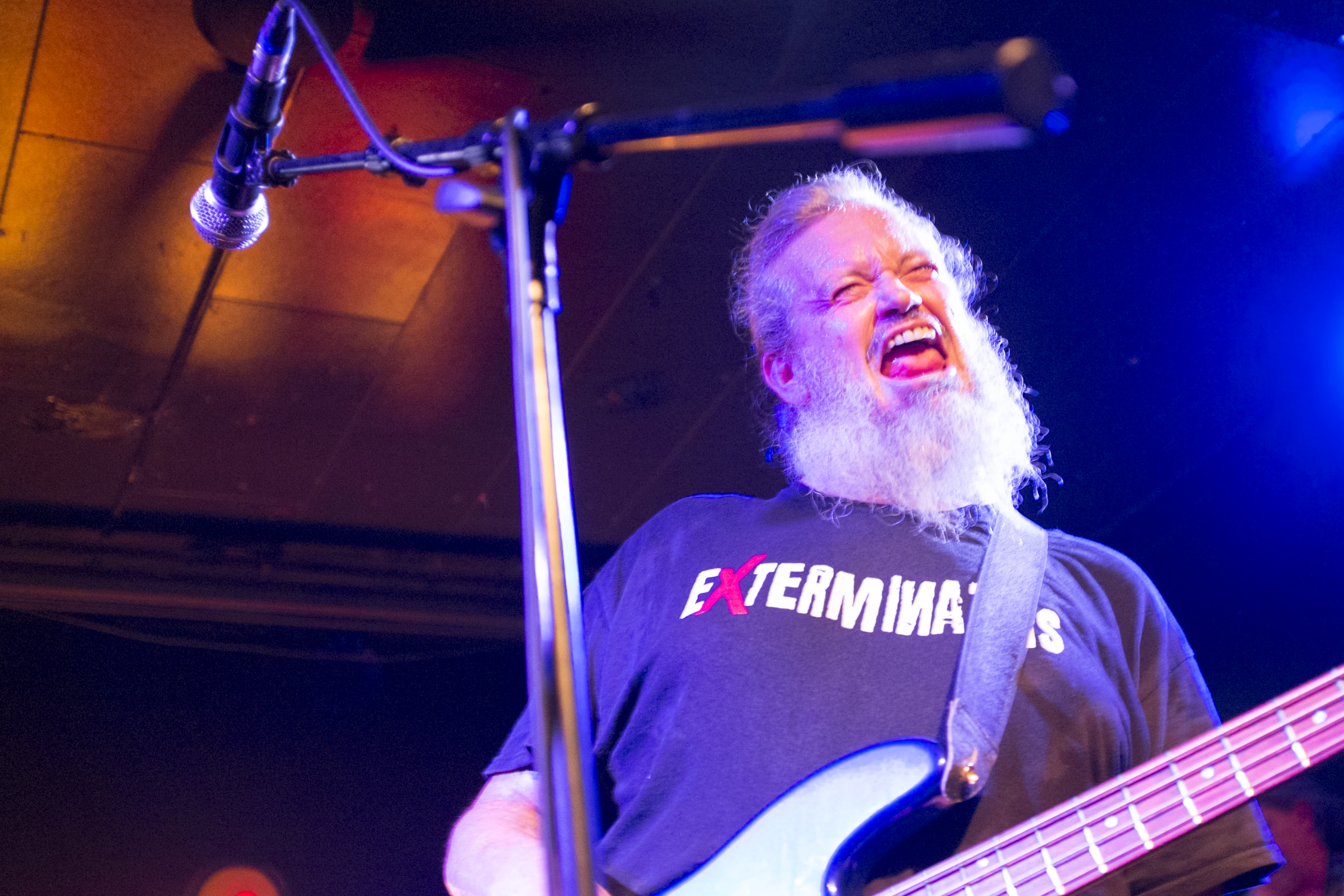
Kirkwood in 2017

In April 2006, Billboard announced that Cris and Curt Kirkwood would be recording again as the Meat Puppets. Curt said the brothers planned to release an epic album of "big Meat Puppets stuff", followed by a tour. The original drummer, Derrick Bostrom, was replaced by drummer Ted Marcus.

"I haven't seen my brother since like 1998, but I'm talking to him a lot," Curt was quoted as saying. "He's [been] clean for more than two years and he's all raring to go. Cris' resurrection is no less than miraculous – it's like a Lazarus-type thing. I was just like, 'If Cris is back, I know his frame of mind.' If he's upright and walking, it's hard to knock him down." Cris appeared on the Meat Puppets' first post-reunion album Rise to Your Knees (2007) and subsequent releases (see Meat Puppets discography).

In 2015, he launched his own self-titled podcast, The Cris Kirkwood Podcast. On July 10, 2015, Kirkwood appeared on Ken Reid's TV Guidance Counselor Podcast. In 2016, Cris either produced and/or played with the following artists for Slope Records – The Exterminators, the Linecutters, and Sad Kid.

== Personal life ==
Kirkwood is a grandson of Carl W. Renstrom, who was owner of Tip-Top Products and a multi-millionaire from Omaha, Nebraska.
