= Heart-Shaped Box =

1993 single by Nirvana

- UK picture sleeve

Single by Nirvana

from the album In Utero
- B-side: "Marigold"; "Milk It"; "Gallons of Rubbing Alcohol Flow Through the Strip"
- Released: August 30, 1993
- Recorded: February 1993
- Studio: Pachyderm (Cannon Falls, Minnesota)
- Genre: Grunge
- Length: 4:39
- Label: DGC
- Songwriter: Kurt Cobain
- Producer: Steve Albini

Nirvana singles chronology
"Puss / Oh, the Guilt" (1993)	"Heart-Shaped Box" (1993)	"All Apologies" / "Rape Me" (1993)

In Utero track listing
- 12 tracks: 1. "Serve the Servants"; 2. "Scentless Apprentice"; 3. "Heart-Shaped Box"; 4. "Rape Me"; 5. "Frances Farmer Will Have Her Revenge on Seattle"; 6. "Dumb"; 7. "Very Ape"; 8. "Milk It"; 9. "Pennyroyal Tea"; 10. "Radio Friendly Unit Shifter"; 11. "tourette's" 12. "All Apologies"

Music videos
- "Heart-Shaped Box" on YouTube; "Heart-Shaped Box" (Director's Cut) on YouTube

"Heart-Shaped Box" is a song by the American grunge band Nirvana, released as the first single from their third album, In Utero, by DGC Records on August 30, 1993. It was written by the vocalist and guitarist, Kurt Cobain. It was one of two songs on In Utero remixed by Scott Litt due to the Geffen executives' dissatisfaction with the mixing by the producer, Steve Albini. The Litt remix also featured additional vocal harmonies and guitar by Cobain, which were the only elements on the album's 12 main tracks not recorded during the original sessions with Albini in February 1993.

Cobain explained that "Heart-Shaped Box" was written about children with terminal cancer. The song is generally also believed to be about his relationship with his wife, Courtney Love, of the American rock band Hole.

To avoid competing with album sales, the single was not released in the United States, but received considerable American radio play, reaching number one on the Billboard Modern Rock Tracks chart. The single reached the top 10 in countries including Portugal, the United Kingdom, Ireland, Finland, and New Zealand, and the top 40 in numerous other countries.

"Heart-Shaped Box" was the final song performed at Nirvana's last concert, on March 1, 1994, in Munich, Germany. It was also the final Nirvana song to receive a music video before the suicide of Cobain in April 1994. The video, directed by Anton Corbijn, won two awards-Best Alternative Video and Best Art Direction in a Video-at the 1994 MTV Video Music Awards.

== Early history ==
"Heart-Shaped Box" was written by Cobain in early 1992 at the apartment in the Fairfax district of Los Angeles, California, he shared with his wife, the American musician Courtney Love. In a 1994 Rolling Stone interview with David Fricke, Love recalled hearing Cobain work on the guitar riff for the first time:

The only time I asked him for a riff for one of my songs, he was in the closet. We had this huge closet, and I heard him in there working on 'Heart-Shaped Box.' He did that in five minutes. Knock, knock, knock. 'What?' 'Do you need that riff?' 'Fuck you!' Slam. [Laughs] He was trying to be so sneaky. I could hear that one from downstairs.

Cobain briefly set the song aside, then resumed work on it after he and Love moved to an apartment in Hollywood Hills, Los Angeles. Nirvana's first attempts to work on it were unsuccessful; Cobain said he waited for bassist Krist Novoselic and drummer Dave Grohl "to come up with something but it just turned into noise all the time". Eventually, during one jam session, Cobain said he "came up with the vocal style instantly and it just all flowed out real fast. We finally realized that it was a good song."

"Heart-Shaped Box" was first performed live on January 16, 1993, at the Hollywood Rock Festival in São Paulo, Brazil. It was first recorded in the studio a few days later, at BMG Ariola studios in Rio de Janeiro. Producer Craig Montgomery recalled hearing the song during the band's soundcheck in São Paulo, saying that "even then Kurt knew this was the single ... All the other [new] stuff they had was way more noisy and abrasive than this. Even the other sound guys that were out there on the platform with me were going, 'Yeah, this is a good song.'" The band's guitar tech, Ernie Bailey, also had a positive initial reaction to the song in Brazil, saying that "you could tell this was an important song, in a lot of ways. You knew that it just had a lot of weight to it, even the first time you heard it."

Two versions of the song were recorded at BMG Ariola, with the initial take being done to test the studio's equipment. The second take was posthumously released on the band's rarities box set, With the Lights Out, in November 2004, and on the compilation album Sliver: The Best of the Box in November 2005. On January 23, the band again performed "Heart-Shaped Box" live, at the Hollywood Rock Festival in Rio de Janeiro. These early versions of the song featured unfinished lyrics and what music journalist Gillian G. Gaar called "a far more experimental solo, more akin to the group's improvs".

== In Utero ==
The final studio version of "Heart-Shaped Box" was recorded in February 1993 by Steve Albini at Pachyderm Studios in Cannon Falls, Minnesota, for the band's third studio album, In Utero. Work on the song began on February 14, the second day of recording. According to Albini in a 2013 interview for the audio series Spotify Landmark, "Heart-Shaped Box" was the only song recorded during the sessions that required "more than a couple of takes", along with eventual fourth single, "Pennyroyal Tea".

In a 2013 Rolling Stone interview with Fricke, Grohl recalled that "everyone was concerned about the tempo of 'Heart-Shaped Box.' But click tracks were not cool. Kurt and Steve came up with this idea — we should use a strobe light [laughs]. We had this long conversation about how it won't dictate the tempo, just imply the tempo. ... I sat there for a take or two with this fucking strobe light in my face until I practically had a seizure."

Despite his overall satisfaction with the recording, Novoselic was unhappy with the original effect used during the song's guitar solo, and recalled arguing with Cobain and Albini about it:

These were the words I said: 'Why do you want to take such a beautiful song and throw this hideous abortion in the middle of it? And they're like, 'Well, I don't know, it sounds good.' They didn't have any arguments, because they were sabotaging it is what they were doing.

=== Remix ===
The guitar effect was eventually removed when the song was remixed, along with second single "All Apologies", by Scott Litt at Bad Animal Studios in Seattle in May 1993, several months before the album's release. Cobain and Novoselic had agreed that the vocals and bass were too quiet in Albini's original mix of the album, and elected to have the two future singles remixed. Litt's remix of "Heart-Shaped Box" also featured newly recorded vocal harmonies and acoustic guitar by Cobain.

== Later performances ==
On September 25, 1993, the band performed "Heart-Shaped Box", along with "Rape Me", on Saturday Night Live at NBC Studios in New York City. It was their first show with second guitarist Pat Smear.

"Heart-Shaped Box" was the final song played at Nirvana's last show, on March 1, 1994, at Terminal 1 of Munich-Riem Airport in Munich, Germany.

== Composition ==
"Heart-Shaped Box"
"Heart-Shaped Box", released as the first single from In Utero, was remixed by Scott Litt in May 1993. Displeased with Steve Albini's original mix of the song, Nirvana had Litt increase the volume of the vocals and bass guitar, and Cobain added backing vocals and acoustic guitar.

"Heart-Shaped Box" is a grunge and alternative rock song that lasts for a duration of four minutes and thirty-nine seconds. According to the sheet music published at Musicnotes.com by BMG Rights Management, it is written in a 4/4 time signature, with a moderate tempo of 100 beats per minute. It is in the key of A♭ minor, modulating to A♭ dorian on the verses, while Kurt Cobain's vocal range spans one octave, from the low note of A♭_{3} to the high note of A♭_{4}.

The song has a basic sequence of A♭^{5}–F♭^{5}–D♭^{5}–A♭–F♭^{5}–D♭^{7} in the verses and A♭^{5}–F♭^{5}–D♭^{7} during the chorus as its chord progression. Journalist Gillian Gaar described "Heart-Shaped Box" as "the Nirvana formula personified, with a restrained, descending riff played through the verse, building in intensity to the cascading passion of the chorus".

=== Lyrics ===
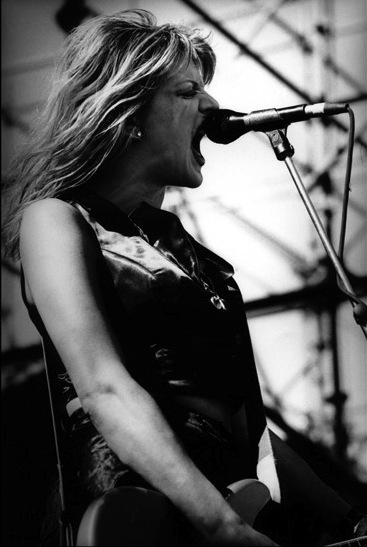
Courtney Love performing with Hole in 1995. Cobain's relationship with Love, whom he married in February 1992, is believed to have inspired the lyrics of "Heart-Shaped Box".

In the 1993 Nirvana biography Come As You Are: The Story of Nirvana, Cobain told author Michael Azerrad that "Heart-Shaped Box" was written about children with cancer. "Every time I see documentaries about little kids with cancer I just freak out", he explained. "It affects me on the highest emotional level, more than anything else on television." As Azerrad noted, however, the song's lyrics were more likely about Love. Charles R. Cross, author of the 2001 Cobain biography Heavier Than Heaven, described the lyric, "I wish I could eat your cancer when you turn black" as "what has to be the most convoluted route any songwriter undertook in pop history to say 'I love you'". Garr wrote that "while the song does reference [cancer], the lyrics appear more to address the physical and emotional dependencies inherent in relationships."

Cobain's unused liner notes for In Utero, first described in Heavier Than Heaven and published in Journals the following year, featured an explanation for "Heart-Shaped Box" that "fell completely apart", according to Cross, "but touched on The Wizard of Oz, 'I Claudius', Leonardo da Vinci, male seahorses (who carry their young), racism in the Old West, and Camille Paglia".

The song's title was inspired by the collection of heart-shaped candy boxes Love kept in the front room of the Fairfax apartment she and Cobain lived in. However, early versions of the song featured the word "coffin" rather than "box". According to Bailey, the song also featured the working title "New Complaint." In a 1993 interview with Circus, Cobain explained that the chorus lyrics "Hey / Wait / I've got a new complaint" were a reference to how he believed he was often perceived by the media.

In 2012, Love wrote on Twitter that "Heart-Shaped Box" was about her vagina. Tweeting to the American musician Lana Del Rey, who had covered the song at a concert in Sydney, Australia, the previous week, Love wrote, "You do know the song is about my Vagina right? 'Throw down your umbilical noose so i can climb right back,' umm ... On top of which some of the lyrics about my vagina I contributed." The tweets were deleted shortly after.

== Release ==
"Heart-Shaped Box" was released as In Utero's first commercial single on August 30, 1993, on CD, cassette tape, and 7-inch, and 12-inch vinyl record formats. The single was released in Europe only and peaked at number five on the UK Singles Chart, making it their highest-charting song there. All copies of the single featured the Grohl-composed "Marigold" as a B-side, while 12-inch vinyl and CD editions also included the In Utero track, "Milk It".

In the United States, DGC sent promo copies of the song to American college, modern rock, and album-oriented rock radio stations in early September. The label did not actively court Top 40 radio, with Geffen Records' head of marketing explaining that "Nirvana didn't sell nearly 5 million [records] because of a hit single. They sold that many albums because of who they are". DGC employee Mark Kates stated that "Generally we don't release commercial singles because we feel it cannibalises album sales" with fellow employee Jim Merlis adding that "European singles are released because overseas there's a whole singles market". However, the single was available in the US in limited numbers as an import release.

"Heart-Shaped Box" entered the Billboard Modern Rock Tracks chart at number seven, and eventually peaked at number one on the chart. The song also reached number four on the Mainstream Rock Tracks chart. Music & Media reported in November, 1993, that the song had been well received on Italian contemporary hit radio station RTL 102.5. In Israel, it was voted in at number 27 on the IBA's "Voice of Israel" singles chart in September 1993. It was also voted in at number 13 on Poland's LP3 chart in 1993.

=== Critical reception ===
Professional ratings
Review scores
Source	Rating
AllMusic	2.5/5 stars

Reviewing In Utero for Rolling Stone, Fricke called "Heart-Shaped Box" "the kind of song Stone Temple Pilots couldn't write even with detailed instructions", and cited it as evidence, along with "Dumb", that if Generation X "is ever going to have its own Lennon — someone who genuinely believes in rock & roll salvation but doesn't confuse mere catharsis with true deliverance — Cobain is damn near it". Phil Alexander of Kerrang! wrote that "on the current single Heart-Shaped Box, the sublime All Apologies ... and the convalescent croon of Penny Royal Tea, [Cobain] re-stakes his claim as one of his generation's most absorbing songsmiths." John Mulvey of the NME called the song "a strangulated, semi-f-ed-up anthem of sorts for a generation who fell in love to 'Teen Spirit' and are now as disturbed as Kurt by a growing sense of maturity".

=== Legacy ===
In his review of Nirvana's eponymous greatest hits album in 2002, Will Bryant of Pitchfork wrote, "I've always considered 'Heart-Shaped Box', with its elliptical guitar figure and explosive choruses, to be one of Cobain's most accomplished compositions. For all its heavy-handed symbolism, the song strikes deepest to Cobain's preoccupation with birth, the menstrual cycle, and female anatomy, wound tightly with primal tension in the verses and released with sublime catharsis in the choruses." Andrew Romano of The Daily Beast called it "as close as Cobain ever got to a perfect song", with "a perfect music video to match".

In 1999, the song was voted number 10 in Kerrang! magazine's "100 Greatest Rock Tracks Ever!" The Guardian and Kerrang! ranked the song number one and number two, respectively, on their lists of the 20 greatest Nirvana songs. In 2022, Pitchfork readers voted it the 30th best song of the 1990s. In November 2025, the song surpassed one billion streams on Spotify.

In 2024, the song was featured in the ending of the Season 4 finale of The Boys.

=== 20th anniversary version ===
A second "Heart-Shaped Box" single was released in September 2013, to promote the 20th anniversary re-release of In Utero. The three-track promo CD single was included with the first 2000 copies of the "Super Deluxe" edition of the re-issue, and featured Albini's original mix of the song and a remix prepared by Albini in 2013 as B-sides.

== Music video ==
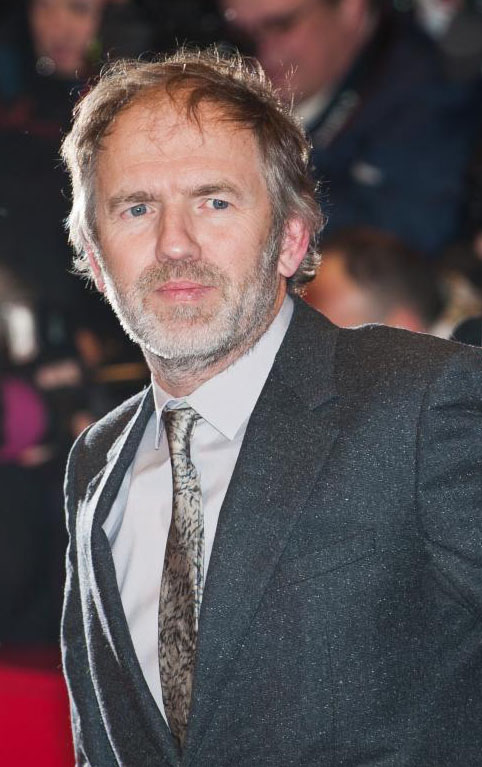
Anton Corbijn, director of the "Heart-Shaped Box" music video, pictured in 2012.

=== Preliminary work ===
The "Heart-Shaped Box" video was the only music video made for In Utero, and the last video released by the band. Cobain had originally approached American filmmaker Kevin Kerslake, who had directed the band's last four music videos, for the songs "Come as You Are", "Lithium", "In Bloom", and "Sliver", to direct it. Five treatments were prepared by Kerslake between July 14 and August 12, and included scenes of Cobain kissing American author William S. Burroughs, whom Cobain had wanted in the video, and the band hanging by their necks from tree branches. However, no shoot arrangements were made, and by the end of August, the group had elected to work with Dutch photographer and video director Anton Corbijn instead.

Corbijn believes he was chosen to work on the video on the recommendation of Love, and cited his connection to Echo & the Bunnymen, a rock band from Liverpool, England where Love briefly lived and whom Love admired. According to Corbijn, Cobain had asked to be sent the music videos he had directed for Echo & the Bunnymen shortly before receiving a fax from Novoselic with drawings and ideas about a Nirvana video.

As Corbijn recalled, Cobain's proposed treatment for the video was "incredibly precise. More precise than I've ever had for a video. I loved it, but initially I was a bit taken aback that somebody came up with so many ideas, because generally my videos are my own ideas ... But then I looked at it and I thought that actually it was pretty good. I was very amazed by somebody writing a song and having those ideas as precise as he did." According to Novoselic, Cobain's original treatment was two pages long; Novoselic recalled typing it on his new laptop while Cobain dictated.

=== Filming ===
The "Heart-Shaped Box" video was filmed on August 31 and September 1 at Raleigh Studios in Los Angeles. Cobain had requested the video be shot in Technicolor, but as Corbijn recalled, "somehow it was not possible; maybe the whole system had been sold to China or something." Instead, Corbijn and his producer came up with the idea to shoot the video in color, then convert it to black and white and have every frame hand-tinted. The process took weeks and led to the vivid brightness of the video's colors.

In a 2013 interview with Andrew Romano of Daily Beast, Corbijn recalled "a really eerie moment" where the actor playing the video's elderly man, "fell down while walking, on the set. He had some kind of bowel cancer, which he didn't know. Something broke open. There was blood everywhere. We had to get the ambulance, and he had to go to the hospital straight off. It was really severe." According to Corbijn, the old man was the most difficult to cast because finding "an old man who looked like an old man in L.A. was not so easy ... In the end we found this fantastic man who had a jazz club or a jazz station on the radio, something like that." Cobain had originally wanted Burroughs to play the role of the elderly man, but Burroughs declined, although they later met and collaborated on the spoken word piece, "The 'Priest' They Called Him".

According to Corbijn, the two other characters in the video, the overweight woman and the young girl, were easier to cast, "although it was difficult sometimes I think for the child to act because there was blood coming out of her blouse at some point."

Corbijn remembered Cobain as "very alert. Smart boy. Very intelligent. He did everything I asked him to do." According to Cali DeWitt, who briefly worked as the Cobains' nanny, Cobain and Love had fought on set, with Cobain putting out a cigarette on his forehead in retaliation to Love's repeated reminders that this was an "important video" and that he needed to "look good". As DeWitt told author Everett True, "if you watch the video, there's a lot of make-up on his forehead because it was a really bad scab, big and in the center. In the close-ups, there's a strip of hair that never seems to move from the middle of his forehead. They had to paste some hair over it."

=== Synopsis ===
The "Heart-Shaped Box" video begins and ends with the band watching the elderly man on a hospital bed being administered medication through an IV drip. Most of the video takes place in what Garr called "a surreal 'outdoor' setting; a field of bright red poppies with a large cross standing in the middle, adjacent to a wood of creepy old trees (both elements in key scenes in The Wizard of Oz)." During the song's first verse, the elderly man, wearing a Santa Claus hat and a loincloth, climbs onto the cross, which is covered by crows. The second verse introduces the young girl in what appears to be a Ku Klux Klan robe and peaked hat reaching for human fetuses in a tree, and the overweight woman in a human organ body suit with angel wings affixed to her back, similar to the winged anatomical model on the cover of In Utero. At one point during the second verse, the girl attempts to chase the three crows from the cross while the old man, now wearing a mitre, is tied to it.

During the song's guitar solo, the girl's hat is blown off her head and falls into a puddle in the poppy field, where it turns black. A brief shot during the solo reveals a fetus in the IV drip. The third verse features Cobain singing directly into the camera without his guitar, while Grohl and Novoselic stand behind him in a room with stars on the walls. The room is actually a box designed by Corbijn with a large heart on top, but the band initially disapproved of the way it looked, and Novoselic asked that it not be filmed from a distance. A brief shot of the box, with the heart above, appears at the start of the final chorus.

The band is featured performing with their instruments during the first two choruses, and without their instruments in what appears to be the same star-decorated box, zoomed out to reveal a bed, nightstand with a lamp on it, and rocking chair, during the final chorus. Both the sky and the walls of the box are blue during the quieter verses, and red during their heavier choruses and the solo. During the video Cobain repeatedly charges the camera, and his face moves in and out of focus until he falls out of the rocking chair.

As Garr pointed out, the Ku Klux Klan imagery recalled Cobain's original idea for the "In Bloom" video, which was to feature a young girl born into the KKK who eventually rejects her parents as "evil".

In his interview with The Daily Beast, Corbijn estimated that he came up with "maybe 15 percent" of the video's ideas, with the rest being Cobain's. "The big woman, for instance, was my idea", he explained. "For me that was Mother Earth. There were a few other things, like the mechanical birds and the fake butterflies and stuff." Corbijn also said the idea to have a crow lip sync parts of the first chorus was his, calling it an example of his "Dutch humor". According to Garr, Cobain had originally wanted to use real animals. Corbijn also added the ladder that the elderly man used to climb up the cross, the box that the band performed in, and the road through the poppy field.

=== "Director's Cut" ===
While editing the video, Corbijn was visited by Cobain and Love, and urged by the latter to use the extended shot of Cobain singing the third verse. As Corbijn later explained, "Kurt looked amazing, and Courtney wanted to keep that shot till the very end. It was a very long take, but she persuaded Kurt to go with that." However, Corbijn then edited a different version which replaced this shot with additional footage of the young girl and woman, as well as scenes of Cobain lying in the poppy field, covered in mist.

According to Corbijn, "They used Courtney's edit initially, and then they put mine out as well. And my edit became the video in the end." This version also appeared on the DVD The Work of Director Anton Corbijn in 2005. Both the "Original" and "Director's Cut" versions of the video appeared as bonus footage in 2013 on the Live and Loud DVD, which was issued as a standalone release as well as part of the 20th anniversary In Utero "Super Deluxe" package.

=== Lawsuit ===
On March 9, 1994, Kerslake sued Nirvana over the "Heart-Shaped Box" video, alleging copyright infringement. According to Nirvana: A Day by Day Eyewitness Chronicle by Carrie Borzillo, Kerslake discovered that he would no longer be directing the video on August 28, 1993, and sent a letter to Corbijn to ensure that none of the images in his five treatments would appear in the final video. Kerslake's lawsuit stated that both Cobain and Nirvana's record company had approved Kerslake's third treatment for the video, with Cobain describing it as "Perfect".

On September 1, 1993, Cobain called Kerslake and invited him to the 1993 MTV Video Music Awards the following day, where Kerslake's video for "In Bloom" was nominated for Best Alternative Video. Kerslake accepted the invitation, and joined the band onstage after they won the award. Soon after Kerslake wrote Cobain a letter, addressed to "kurdt", thanking him for the invitation but expressing his unhappiness over reports that his alleged ideas had been used in Corbijn's shoot. Cobain did not respond, but a meeting was set up between attorneys and the record label to discuss the video.

The case did not affect the video's distribution, and was ultimately settled out of court. In 2019, Cobain's former manager Danny Goldberg discussed the lawsuit in his Cobain biography Serving the Servant, writing that "after the video was aired, Kerslake sued Kurt, claiming, absurdly in my opinion, that he was responsible for the idea of 'Heart Shaped Box.' Kurt was deeply offended. After he died the remaining members of Nirvana settled with Kerslake."

=== Reception ===
The "Heart-Shaped Box" music video was the number one most played music video for four weeks on MTV in the US as recorded by Billboard magazine. It charted at number ten on the CMJ New Music Report multi-channel US music video chart. It was also number one on Canada's MuchMusic Countdown for two weeks in November 1993. The video won two MTV Video Music Awards in 1994, for Best Alternative Video and for Best Art Direction. Since the ceremony was held after Cobain's suicide in April 1994, the awards were accepted by surviving bandmembers Grohl, Novoselic and Smear. "Heart-Shaped Box" also topped the music video category in the 1993 Village Voice Pazz & Jop critics' poll. The video was also placed into active rotation on MTV Europe and power play on The Box in the UK and Ireland. It was also played on Rage in Australia.

Cobain was pleased with the video, saying that it came "closer to what I've seen in my mind, to what I've envisioned, than any other video." Novoselic agreed that "Anton did a beautiful job on that video." Cobain later asked Corbijn to direct a video for "Pennyroyal Tea", but Corbijn refused, saying that he felt "the 'Heart-Shaped Box' video was so good, I could never make a video that was as good or better." According to Corbijn, Cobain responded by telling him he would "never make another video if you don't do it. And he didn't."

=== Legacy ===
In 2011, NME ranked the song's music video at number 22 on its of the "100 Greatest Music Videos". That same year, Time magazine placed "Heart-Shaped Box" on its list of "The 30 All-Time Best Music Videos", where it was described as "beautiful and ... terrible".

In February 2016, Grohl reunited with actress Kelsey Rohr, who played the girl in the "Heart-Shaped Box" music video 23 years earlier, at the age of six. Rohr stated that "Today reminded me that I peaked at 6 years old but I was the most badass kid on the playground. Today was the absolute coolest. Or in Dave's words seeing each other today was a 'historic moment'! What a legend!"

== Track listing ==
All songs were written by Kurt Cobain except where noted.

CD single and 12" vinyl

1. "Heart-Shaped Box" – 4:39
2. "Milk It" – 3:52
3. "Marigold" (Dave Grohl) – 2:33

Cassette and 7" vinyl

1. "Heart-Shaped Box"
2. "Marigold" (Grohl)

US 12" vinyl promo single

1. "Heart-Shaped Box"
2. "Gallons of Rubbing Alcohol Flow Through the Strip" (Cobain, Grohl, Novoselic)

2013 20th Anniversary promo CD single
(Released with first 2000 copies of the 20th Anniversary "Super Deluxe" edition of In Utero)

1. "Heart-Shaped Box" (Original 1993 album version, mixed by Scott Litt)
2. "Heart-Shaped Box" (Previously unreleased 1993 Steve Albini mix)
3. "Heart-Shaped Box" (Previously unreleased 2013 Steve Albini mix)

== Personnel ==
- Kurt Cobain – vocals, guitar
- Krist Novoselic – bass
- Dave Grohl – drums

== Charts ==
=== Weekly charts ===
1993 weekly chart performance for "Heart-Shaped Box"
Chart (1993)	Peak position
Australia (ARIA)	21
Australia Alternative (ARIA)	1
Belgium (Ultratop 50 Flanders)	31
Belgium (VRT Top 30 Flanders)	18
Canada Top Singles (RPM)	17
Canada Contemporary Album Radio (The Record)	21
Denmark (ANR North Jutland)	28
East Central Europe Airplay (Music & Media)	9
European Hot 100 Singles (Music & Media)	16
Finland (The Official Finnish Charts)	9
France (SNEP)	37
Iberian Airplay (Music & Media)	7
Ireland (IRMA)	6
Netherlands (Dutch Top 40)	32
Netherlands (Single Top 100)	36
New Zealand (Recorded Music NZ)	9
Portugal (AFP)	4
Sweden (Sverigetopplistan)	16
UK Singles (MRIB)	4
UK Singles (Official Charts)	5
UK Airplay (ERA)	14
UK Rock & Metal Singles (CIN)	1
US Alternative Airplay (Billboard)	1
US Mainstream Rock (Billboard)	4
US Progressive Retail (CMJ) Import CD	37
US College Radio Top 150 (CMJ)	20
US College Radio Top Commercial (CMJ)	3
US College Radio Top Cuts (CMJ)	2
US AOR Tracks (Radio & Records)	2

1995–1996 weekly chart performance for "Heart-Shaped Box"
Chart (1995–1996)	Peak position
Denmark (Tracklisten) Charted on the singles chart as part of the Singles box set	5
France (SNEP) Charted on the singles chart as part of the Singles box set	17

2013 20th anniversary release chart performance
Chart (2013)	Peak position
UK Physical Singles Sales (OCC)	97

=== Year-end charts ===
Year-end chart performance for "Heart-Shaped Box"
Chart (1993)	Position
Australia Alternative (ARIA)	18
US Album Rock Tracks (Billboard)	35
US Modern Rock Tracks (Billboard)	10
US AOR Tracks (Radio & Records)	28

== Certifications ==
Certifications for "Heart-Shaped Box"
Region	Certification	Certified units/sales
Australia (ARIA)	3× Platinum	210,000^{‡}
Brazil (Pro-Música Brasil)	Gold	30,000^{‡}
Italy (FIMI) Sales since 2009	Gold	50,000^{‡}
New Zealand (RMNZ)	3× Platinum	90,000^{‡}
Spain (Promusicae)	Gold	30,000^{‡}
United Kingdom (BPI) Sales since 2004	Platinum	600,000^{‡}
United States (RIAA)	3× Platinum	3,000,000^{‡}
^{‡} Sales+streaming figures based on certification alone.

== Other releases ==
- A live version, from the band's performance for MTV at Pier 48 in Seattle on December 13, 1993, appeared on the Live and Loud DVD, released in September 2013.
- A live version, recorded at the Great Western Forum in Inglewood, California on December 30, 1993, appeared on the live compilation, From the Muddy Banks of the Wishkah, released in October 1996. The full concert will be released on the 30th anniversary "Super Deluxe" edition of In Utero in October 2023.
- The 30th anniversary "Super Deluxe" In Utero reissue also includes the band's concert at the Seattle Center Arena in Seattle on January 7, 1994, which featured a version of "Heart-Shaped Box."
- A live version, recorded at Palaghiaccio in Marino, Italy on February 22, 1994, appears as bonus material on the 30th anniversary "Deluxe" and "Super Deluxe" reissues of In Utero released in October 2023.
