= All Apologies =

1993 single by Nirvana

Single by Nirvana

from the album In Utero
- A-side: "Rape Me" (double A-side)
- B-side: "Moist Vagina"
- Released: December 6, 1993
- Recorded: February 1993
- Studio: Pachyderm (Cannon Falls, Minnesota)
- Genre: Grunge; alternative rock
- Length: 3:50
- Label: DGC
- Songwriter: Kurt Cobain
- Producer: Steve Albini

Nirvana singles chronology
"Heart-Shaped Box" (1993)	"All Apologies" / "Rape Me" (1993)	"All Apologies (unplugged)" (1994)

In Utero track listing
- 12 tracks: 1. "Serve the Servants"; 2. "Scentless Apprentice"; 3. "Heart-Shaped Box"; 4. "Rape Me"; 5. "Frances Farmer Will Have Her Revenge on Seattle"; 6. "Dumb"; 7. "Very Ape"; 8. "Milk It"; 9. "Pennyroyal Tea"; 10. "Radio Friendly Unit Shifter"; 11. "tourette's" 12. "All Apologies"

Music video
- "All Apologies" on YouTube

"All Apologies" is a song by the American rock band Nirvana, written by vocalist and guitarist Kurt Cobain. It appears as the final track on the band's third and final studio album, In Utero, released by DGC Records in September 1993. The song closes the American version of the album, while non-US versions of In Utero feature an additional song, "Gallons of Rubbing Alcohol Flow Through the Strip", which begins after approximately 20 minutes of silence on the same track.

On December 6, 1993, "All Apologies" was released as the second single from In Utero, as a double A-side with the song "Rape Me". It was Nirvana's final single before Cobain's suicide in April 1994.

Although not released as a physical single in the US, "All Apologies" became the third Nirvana song to top the Modern Rock chart, and reached number 32 on the UK Singles Chart. It also reached the Top 40 in France, Ireland and New Zealand. It was nominated for two Grammy Awards in 1995, and won a BMI award for most played song on American college radio during the eligible period from 1994 to 1995. It was also included on the Rock and Roll Hall of Fame's list of "The Songs That Shaped Rock and Roll".

No music video was made for "All Apologies", with Cobain explaining in a December 1993 MTV interview that he "hadn't bothered to come up with any ideas lately" because he had been "concentrating on touring." MTV began airing a live version, recorded at the band's MTV Unplugged concert shortly before the single's release, as a music video instead. This version was released as a promotional single in February 1994, and also generated heavy airplay.

== Early history ==
"All Apologies" was written by Cobain in 1990. In a 2005 interview with Wes Orshoski of Harp, Nirvana drummer Dave Grohl recalled that the song was "something that Kurt wrote on [a] 4-track in our apartment in Olympia. I remember hearing it and thinking, 'God, this guy has such a beautiful sense of melody, I can't believe he's screaming all the time.'" According to Cobain's manager Danny Goldberg in his 2008 memoir Bumping into Geniuses, Cobain "played the Beatles song 'Norwegian Wood' over and over, hour after hour" while writing the song.

"All Apologies" was first recorded in the studio by Craig Montgomery at Music Source Studios in Seattle, Washington on January 1, 1991. This version, described by music journalist Gillian G. Gaar as "having a more upbeat pop-folk sound" than later versions, featured bassist Krist Novoselic accompanying Cobain on guitar, playing seventh chords behind the guitar riff, and Grohl's drumming accented by a tambourine. The song was first performed live at the Wolverhampton Civic Hall in Wolverhampton, West Midlands, England on November 6, 1991.

== In Utero ==
The second and final studio version of "All Apologies" was recorded by Steve Albini at Pachyderm Studios in Cannon Falls, Minnesota in February 1993, during the recording sessions for In Utero. The song, at that point tentatively titled "La La La", was recorded on February 14, the second day of the sessions.

=== Cello ===
The recording features cello by Kera Schaley, a friend of Albini's who at the time played in the Chicago band, Doubt. Schaley had initially been asked by Albini to compose a cello part for the song "Dumb", and after hearing what she had written, Cobain asked her to "play around with 'All Apologies.'" As she recalled in a 2010 interview with Swan Fungus, "Most of the cello on that was me just messing around and then Kurt had me learn one specific line that he wanted everyone to be playing the same thing on. I sort of thought they were going to scrap the cello on that one, but it stayed in."

In a 2023 interview with Rolling Stone, Schaley revealed that Albini was initially resistant to the idea of adding cello to "All Apologies." As she explained to interviewer Brian Hiatt, "Steve kept trying to talk [Cobain] out of putting cello on it," but says that "Kurt and I won in the end." According to Schaley, Cobain "loved the deep sound, like the really deep, groaning sound of the low notes. He was like, 'just lay on that for a long time.' And so I just laid on that low note for him. And I got some noise parts in there. I like making noise on the cello, too. And if you listen for some high screeching sounds at the end, that’s me."

Despite the addition of cello, Albini was pleased with the recording, saying that he remembered "really liking the sound of that song as a contrast to the more aggressive ones" and that "it sounded really good in that it sounded lighter, but it didn't sound conventional. It was sort of a crude light sound that suited the band." In a 1993 Rolling Stone interview, Cobain told David Fricke that songs such as "All Apologies" and "Dumb" represented "the lighter, more dynamic" sound that he wished had been more prominent on previous Nirvana albums.

=== Remix ===
The band eventually elected to remix "All Apologies", along with the album's lead single "Heart-Shaped Box", due to concerns that the vocals and bass were not loud enough in Albini's original mixes. In a 1993 Guitar World interview, Cobain explained to English journalist Jon Savage:

"[The quieter songs on In Utero] came out really good, and Steve Albini's recording technique really served those songs well; you can really hear the ambience in those songs. It was perfect for them. But for "All Apologies" and "Heart-Shaped Box" we needed more. My main complaint was that the vocals weren't loud enough. In every Albini mix I've ever heard, the vocals are always too quiet. That's just the way he likes things, and he's a real difficult person to persuade otherwise. I mean, he was trying to mix each tune within an hour, which is just not how the songs work. It was fine for a few songs, but not all of them. You should be able to do a few different mixes and pick the best."

The two songs were remixed by Scott Litt, chosen due to his work with American rock band R.E.M., in May 1993 at Bad Animals in Seattle, Washington. A third song, "Pennyroyal Tea", was remixed by Litt in November 1993 in preparation for its release as a single. Novoselic defended the band's decision to remix "All Apologies" and "Heart-Shaped Box" by calling them "gateways" to the more abrasive sound of the rest of the album, and that once listeners played the record they would discover "this aggressive wild sound, a true alternative record".

According to Goldberg in his 2019 Cobain biography Serving the Servant, Cobain was "euphoric" after hearing Litt's mix of "All Apologies", the first of the two songs initially remixed.

== Post-In Utero ==
On November 18, 1993, Nirvana performed an acoustic version of "All Apologies" during their MTV Unplugged performance at Sony Music Studios in New York City. This version of the song featured Pat Smear on second guitar and Lori Goldston on cello.

"All Apologies" was performed for the final time live at Nirvana's last concert, at Terminal Eins in Munich, Germany on March 1, 1994.

== Composition ==
Cobain dedicated "All Apologies" to his wife, Courtney Love, and their daughter, Frances Bean Cobain, during the band's appearance at the Reading Festival in Reading, England on August 30, 1992. "I like to think the song is for them," he told Michael Azerrad in the 1993 biography Come As You Are: The Story of Nirvana, "but the words don't really fit in relation to us...the feeling does, but not the lyrics." Cobain summarized the song's mood as "peaceful, happy, comfort – just happy happiness."

In a 2023 Rolling Stone interview, Azerrad speculated that the lyric "aqua seafoam shame" may have been "a reference to being in a hospital, with all those bland aqua-seafoam-colored walls and [Cobain is] feeling shamed because he’s there for his drug habit.”

== Release ==
"All Apologies" was released as a double A-side single with "Rape Me" on December 6, 1993, on CD single, cassette single, and 7-inch and 12-inch vinyl record formats. The only instruction Cobain gave the single's art director, Robert Fisher, regarding the packaging was that he wanted "something with seahorses". Like its predecessor "Heart-Shaped Box", the single was not released commercially in the United States. However, the song did peak at number one on the US Modern Rock Tracks Chart, remaining on the chart for 21 weeks and boosting sales of In Utero nationwide. In January 1994, the "All Apologies" UK CD single became available in the US in limited numbers as an import release. In February 1994, "All Apologies" was voted in as the number one most wanted song by listeners of the Hawaii Free Radio.

"All Apologies" was nominated for a Grammy Award for Best Rock Performance by a Duo or Group with Vocal and Best Rock Song in 1995. "All Apologies" is also a BMI Award-winning song, for being the most played song on U.S. college radio during the eligible period from 1994 to 1995.

The B-side "Moist Vagina" was never performed live and released only on the All Apologies single. The song's name was changed to MV for discreetness on some versions. Most of the song is Cobain yelling the word "Marijuana!".

=== Critical reception ===
Professional ratings
Review scores
Source	Rating
AllMusic	2.5/5 stars

Everett True of Melody Maker named "All Apologies" the magazine's "Single of the Week", calling it "the most supremely resigned, supremely weary fuck you to the outside world I've heard this year," with "the most gorgeous, aching tune, an emotionally draining ennui." In his review of In Utero for Rolling Stone, David Fricke called the song a "stunning trump card, the fluid twining of cello and guitar hinting at a little fireside R.E.M. while the full-blaze pop glow of the chorus shows the debt of inspiration Cobain has always owed to Paul Westerberg and the vintage Replacements." Christopher John Farley of Time called it In Utero's "best song" and "a riddling, fitting ending to a great album."

=== Legacy ===
In 2004, Q ranked "All Apologies" first on their list of the "10 Greatest Nirvana Songs Ever." In 2005, Blender ranked it at number 99 on their list of "The 500 Greatest Songs Since You Were Born". In 2011, it was ranked at number 462 on Rolling Stone's "500 Greatest Songs of All Time" list, moving down seven spots from its position in 2004, and first on the NME's list of the Nirvana's "10 Best Tracks." Rolling Stone placed it at number 13 on their ranking of 102 Nirvana songs in 2015. In 2019, The Guardian ranked it second on their list of "Nirvana's 20 greatest songs.: In 2022, Pitchfork ranked it at number 140 on their "250 Best Songs of the 1990s" list, with Jayson Greene writing that its melody was "so simple it seems as though someone, somewhere, must always have been singing it." The same year, Pitchfork readers voted it the 39th best song of the decade. In 2023, it was ranked second on the A.V. Club's "Essential Nirvana: Their 30 greatest songs, ranked" list, with Stephen Thomas Erlewine calling it "a song so quiet that it almost plays as a hymn"

"All Apologies" is included in the Rock and Roll Hall of Fame's unranked list of "The Songs That Shaped Rock and Roll", along with the band's 1991 breakthrough single "Smells Like Teen Spirit."

=== In pop culture ===
Both the studio and MTV Unplugged versions of "All Apologies" appeared in an episode of the American drama television show Six Feet Under in August 2005. The episode was titled "All Alone", a misrepresentation of the song's closing lyric, "All in all is all we all are."

On February 4, 2018, an instrumental version of the song appeared in a Super Bowl commercial for T-mobile. This version originally appeared on the 2006 album Lullaby Renditions of Nirvana, part of the Rockabye Baby! series of albums which reinterpreted songs by popular artists as lullabies, aimed towards infants. It also appeared in the 2015 Cobain documentary Montage of Heck, directed by Brett Morgen.

=== Covers ===
"All Apologies" was covered by Irish singer Sinéad O'Connor as the seventh track on her album Universal Mother, released in September 1994. A music video was made for O'Connor's version, and it appeared in an episode of the American drama television show Big Little Lies in 2019. In 2024, it was featured in the A24 film Queer, directed by Luca Guadagnino, as well as in the film's trailer.

The February 1996 release of jazz pianist Herbie Hancock's 35th studio album, The New Standard, included Hancock's "All Apologies" cover as the album's ninth track.

On April 10, 2014, "All Apologies" was performed by surviving Nirvana members Grohl, Novoselic, and Pat Smear, with lead vocals by New Zealand musician Lorde, at Nirvana's Rock and Roll Hall of Fame induction ceremony at Barclays Centre in Brooklyn, New York. The performance also featured American rock musicians Annie Clark, Kim Gordon, and Joan Jett. On January 30, 2025, the song was again performed by Grohl, Novoselic and Smear, with Dave's daughter, Violet Grohl, on lead vocals, and Gordon on bass, at the Kia Forum in Inglewood, California for FireAid, to help with relief efforts for the January 2025 Southern California wildfires. It was the first reunion of the surviving Nirvana members in five years.

== MTV Unplugged version ==
"All Apologies (unplugged)"

Promotional single by Nirvana

from the album MTV Unplugged in New York
- Released: February 5, 1994
- Recorded: November 18, 1993 at Sony Music Studios in New York City
- Genre: Alternative rock, acoustic rock
- Length: 4:23
- Label: DGC
- Songwriter: Kurt Cobain
- Producers: Alex Coletti, Scott Litt, Nirvana

Nirvana singles chronology
"All Apologies" / "Rape Me" (1993)	"All Apologies (unplugged)" (1994)	"Pennyroyal Tea" (1994)

MTV Unplugged in New York track listing
- 13 tracks: 1. "About a Girl"; 2. "Come as You Are"; 3. "Jesus Doesn't Want Me for a Sunbeam"; 4. "The Man Who Sold the World"; 5. "Pennyroyal Tea"; 6. "Dumb"; 7. "Polly"; 8. "On a Plain"; 9. "Something in the Way"; 10. "Plateau"; 11. "Oh, Me"; 12. "Lake of Fire"; 13. "All Apologies"; 14. "Where Did You Sleep Last Night"

=== Music video ===
MTV began airing the MTV Unplugged version of "All Apologies" as a music video on December 12, 1993, which was shortly after the concert was taped, and which coincided with the release of the song as the second single from In Utero in December 1993. In a MTV interview that month, Cobain revealed that he did not consider this version a strong performance of the song, saying that the band had "played that song a lot better before," but explained that he had been too busy with touring to come up with a music video for the studio version.

According to American comedian Bobcat Goldthwait, however, who opened for Nirvana at some shows during the In Utero tour, Cobain had shared his idea for an official "All Apologies" video that revolved around him being drunk at a party. Goldthwait suggested that Cobain perform the song dressed as Lee Harvey Oswald, singing into the camera while putting his rifle together in the Texas School Book Depository from which he assassinated American president John F. Kennedy. Cobain told Goldthwait that MTV didn't allow guns in music videos, so Goldthwait suggested he use a pie instead of a gun, with Novoselic or Grohl playing Kennedy and being hit by the pie in the back of their head. Goldthwait said Cobain was receptive to the idea, despite no video being made.

The MTV Unplugged "All Apologies" video was ranked at number seven on MTV's Top 100 Video Countdown of 1994. It also aired on MTV Europe starting in February 1994 to promote the In Utero album and the studio version of the song which had been released as a single, and was eventually placed into medium rotation in June 1995 as the third music video used to promote the MTV Unplugged in New York album, following "About a Girl" in October 1994, and "The Man Who Sold the World" in February 1995.

=== Promotional single ===
In addition to being aired as the song's music video, the MTV Unplugged version of "All Apologies" was released as a promotional single in February 1994, and on the album MTV Unplugged in New York in November 1994. It was their last single released before Cobain's suicide in April 1994.

In a February 1994 review of the song, Billboard wrote that "stripped to its basic elements, the song stands quite tall, and Kurt Cobain's rough-hewn vocal has many more shades and colors to enjoy. Already flooding rock radio, the task will be bringing this one to pop programmers—which seems like a distinct possibility". According to a Cashbox article published the same month, the Unplugged version was "enjoying ultra-heavy rotation, stoking radio interest in the song". The Unplugged version has reportedly gone on to receive more radio airplay than the studio version, and appears on both of the band's greatest hits albums, Nirvana (2002) and Icon (2010).

In 2014, Kyle McGovern of Spin called the Unplugged version "the definitive rendition" of the song, writing that "its power lies in those chilling cello lines; the candle-lit intimacy that can be felt even without watching the iconic performance footage; and that final mantra, gently sung by Cobain and Dave Grohl: 'All in all is all we are,' an epitaph equal parts puzzling, comforting, and devastating." In the magazine's 1995 review of MTV Unplugged in New York, Rob Sheffield wrote that the rendition "begins hesitantly, fingers tapping on strings in a brittle staccato, until Dave Grohl's elegantly brushed drums push Cobain into a terse valentine to a lover who has married him and buried him, a lover from whom he can't escape because after he'd tasted the joy of being easily amused, it hurts too much to go back to jaded detachment."

== Formats and track listings ==
=== In Utero version ===
Released as a double A-side with "Rape Me".

CD single and 12-inch vinyl

1. A. "All Apologies" – 3:50
2. A. "Rape Me" – 2:49
3. B. "Moist Vagina" – 3:34

Cassette and 7-inch vinyl

1. A. "All Apologies" – 3:50
2. A. "Rape Me" – 2:49

=== MTV Unplugged in New York version ===
US promotional CD single (released February 1994)

1. All Apologies. (Unplugged version).
2. All Apologies. (In Utero version).

== Charts ==
=== Weekly charts ===
Chart (1993–1995)	Peak position
Australia (ARIA)	58
Belgium (Ultratop 50 Flanders)	43
Canada Top Singles (RPM); Included Unplugged version	41
Canada Contemporary Album Radio (The Record); Included Unplugged version	16
European Hot 100 Singles (Music & Media)	77
France (SNEP)	20
Ireland (IRMA)	20
New Zealand (Recorded Music NZ)	32
Spain Airplay (Music & Media); Unplugged version	16
UK Singles (MRIB)	28
UK Singles (Official Charts)	32
UK Airplay (ERA)	31
UK Rock & Metal Singles (CIN)	4
US Radio Songs (Billboard); Included Unplugged version	45
US Mainstream Rock Airplay (Billboard); Included Unplugged version	4
US Alternative Airplay (Billboard)	1
US College Radio Top Commercial (CMJ)	7
US College Radio Top Commercial (CMJ); Unplugged version	3
US College Radio Top Cuts (CMJ); Unplugged version	2
US CHR Top 40 (Radio & Records); Included Unplugged version	30
US AOR Tracks (Radio & Records); Included Unplugged version	3
US Alternative Top 50 (Radio & Records); Unplugged version	3

Chart (1995–1996)	Peak position
Denmark (Tracklisten); Charted on the singles chart as part of the Singles box set	5
European Hot 100 Singles (Music & Media); Charted on the singles chart as part of the Singles box set	55
France (SNEP); Charted on the singles chart as part of the Singles box set	17

=== Year-end charts ===
Chart (1994)	Position
France (SNEP)	49
US Album Rock Tracks (Billboard)	15
US Modern Rock Tracks (Billboard)	34
US Top Rock Tracks (Radio & Records)	16
US Top Alternative (Radio & Records)	41

== Awards ==
Unplugged version

Year	Award	Results
1995	BMI Award for most played song on college radio	Won
1995	Grammy Award for Best Rock Performance by a Duo or Group with Vocal	Nominated
1995	Grammy Award for Best Rock Song	Nominated

== Certifications ==
Region	Certification	Certified units/sales
Australia (ARIA)	Platinum	70,000^{‡}
New Zealand (RMNZ)	Platinum	30,000^{‡}
United Kingdom (BPI) Sales since 2004	Gold	400,000^{‡}
United States (RIAA)	Platinum	1,000,000^{‡}
^{‡} Sales+streaming figures based on certification alone.

== Accolades ==
Year	Publication	Country	Accolade	Rank
1998	Kerrang!	United Kingdom	20 Great Nirvana Songs Picked by the Stars	4
2004	Q	United Kingdom	High Spirits: 10 Greatest Nirvana Songs Ever	1
2005	Blender	United States	The 500 Greatest Songs Since You Were Born	99
2011	Rolling Stone	United States	Rolling Stone's 500 Greatest Songs of All Time	462
2011	NME	United Kingdom	Nirvana: Their 10 Best Tracks	1
2019	The Guardian	United Kingdom	Nirvana's 20 greatest songs – ranked!	2
2022	Pitchfork	United States	The 250 Best Songs of the 1990s	140
2022	Pitchfork	United States	The 100 Best Songs and Albums of the 1990s, According to Pitchfork Readers	39
2023	The A.V. Club	United States	Essential Nirvana: Their 30 greatest songs, ranked	2
2026	Radio X	United Kingdom	20 of the best acoustic versions of rock and indie songs	1

== Personnel ==
Nirvana

- Kurt Cobain – vocals, guitars
- Krist Novoselic – bass
- Dave Grohl – drums

Additional personnel

- Kera Schaley – cello

== Other releases ==
- The studio version recorded at Music Source Studios in Seattle on January 1, 1991 appeared on the "Deluxe" and "Super Deluxe" editions of the 20th anniversary version of In Utero, released in September 2013.
- A boombox-recorded demo, featuring Cobain on vocals and guitar, appeared on the Nirvana box set With the Lights Out, released in November 2004. A sped-up version of the same recording appeared on the menu of the DVD included in the set. This recording was re-released on the compilation album, Sliver: The Best of the Box in November 2005. The demo is believed to have been recorded in 1992 or 1993.
- The live version recorded at the 1992 Reading Festival in Reading, England appeared on Live at Reading, released in November 2009 on CD and DVD.
- Albini's original mix of the Pachyderm version was released on the 20th anniversary "Deluxe" and "Super Deluxe" versions of In Utero. The re-issue also included a remix by Albini, done in 2013.
- A live version, recorded at Pier 48 in Seattle, Washington on December 13, 1993 for MTV, was released on the live video Live and Loud in September 2013.
- The 30th anniversary "Super Deluxe" reissue of In Utero, released in October 2023, included the band's full concerts at the Great Western Forum in Inglewood, California on December 30, 1993, and at the Seattle Center Arena in Seattle on January 7, 1994, both of which featured versions of "All Apologies."

== Cover versions ==
Year	Artist	Album
1994	Sinéad O'Connor	Universal Mother
1996	Herbie Hancock	The New Standard
2011	Little Roy	Battle for Seattle

== Bibliography ==
- Azerrad, Michael (1994). Come as You Are: The Story of Nirvana. Doubleday. ISBN 0-385-47199-8.
- DeRogatis, Jim (2003). Milk It!: Collected Musings on the Alternative Music Explosion of the 90's. Da Capo Press. ISBN 0-306-81271-1.
- Gaar, Gillian G (2006). In Utero. Continuum Publishing. ISBN 0-8264-1776-0.
- St Thomas, Kurt; Smith, Troy (2004). Nirvana: The Chosen Rejects. St. Martin's Press. ISBN 0-312-20663-1.
