= Lithium (Nirvana song) =

1992 single by Nirvana

- UK picture sleeve, with sonogram of Frances Bean Cobain

Single by Nirvana

from the album Nevermind
- B-side: "Been a Son" (live); "Curmudgeon"; "D-7"
- Released: July 13, 1992
- Recorded: May 1991
- Studio: Sound City (Van Nuys, California)
- Genre: Alternative rock; grunge; punk rock
- Length: 4:16
- Label: DGC
- Songwriter: Kurt Cobain (Note: On the original release of Nevermind, the lyrics were credited to Cobain while the music was credited to the whole band. Later releases credit this song solely to Cobain.)
- Producers: Butch Vig; Nirvana

Nirvana singles chronology
"Come as You Are" (1992)	"Lithium" (1992)	"In Bloom" (1992)

Nevermind track listing
- 13 tracks: 1. "Smells Like Teen Spirit"; 2. "In Bloom"; 3. "Come as You Are"; 4. "Breed"; 5. "Lithium"; 6. "Polly"; 7. "Territorial Pissings"; 8. "Drain You"; 9. "Lounge Act"; 10. "Stay Away"; 11. "On a Plain"; 12. "Something in the Way"; 13. "Endless, Nameless"

Music video
- "Lithium" on YouTube

"Lithium" is a song by the American rock band Nirvana, written by vocalist and guitarist Kurt Cobain. It appears as the fifth track on the band's second album, Nevermind, released by DGC Records in September 1991.

In a 1992 interview with California fanzine Flipside, Cobain explained that the song was a fictionalized account of a man who "turned to religion as a last resort to keep himself alive" after the death of his girlfriend, "to keep him from suicide." Nirvana biographer Michael Azerrad described its lyrics as "an update on Karl Marx's description of religion as the 'opiate of the masses.'"

"Lithium" was released as the third single from Nevermind in September 1991, peaking at number 64 on the US Billboard Hot 100 and number 11 on the UK Singles Chart. It also reached number one in Finland and the top five in Ireland and Portugal. The accompanying music video, directed by American filmmaker Kevin Kerslake, is a compilation of live footage from the band's October 31, 1991, concert at the Paramount Theatre in Seattle, Washington, and from the completed but then-unreleased film, 1991: The Year Punk Broke.

== Early history ==
Written in 1990, "Lithium" was debuted at a video session at the Evergreen State College's television studio in Olympia, Washington on March 20, 1990. The full session, which also included versions of three songs from the band's 1989 debut album, Bleach, was directed by Jon Snyder and conceived by Cobain as a potential video release. It featured the band performing live while a montage of television footage taped by Cobain at home playing in the background. To date, no full songs from this session have been officially released by Nirvana's record company, although videos for "Lithium" and "School," edited by Snyder and featuring additional footage and still photos, appeared on two episodes of 1200 Seconds, a television show produced by Evergreen students. The episodes aired in the fall of 1990 on a local community access cable station.

The song was added to Nirvana's setlist soon after, over a year before the release of Nevermind. Kim Thayil, guitarist of Seattle rock band Soundgarden, recalled hearing it for the first time during Nirvana's show at the Off Ramp Cafe in Seattle on November 25, 1990, saying that "when I heard 'Lithium,' it stuck in my mind. Ben, our bass player, came up to me and said, 'That's the hit. That's the Top 40 hit right there."

In April 1990, "Lithium" was recorded by Butch Vig at Smart Studios in Madison, Wisconsin, during the recording sessions for what was intended to be a second album for the band's original label, Sub Pop. However, the release was abandoned after the departure of drummer Chad Channing later that year, and the eight-song session was instead circulated as a demo tape, which helped generate interest with the band among major labels.

On September 25, 1990, Cobain performed a solo acoustic version of the song on the Boy Meets Girl show, hosted by Calvin Johnson, on KAOS (FM) in Olympia, Washington.

== Nevermind ==
"Lithium" was re-recorded by Vig in May 1991 at Sound City Studios in Van Nuys, California, during the sessions for what became Nirvana's second album and major-label debut, Nevermind. Preliminary attempts at recording the song's instruments were unsuccessful, in part because the band was having a difficult time maintaining a steady tempo, and kept speeding up. After one failed take, the band abandoned the song as a "frustrated" Cobain began playing the song, "Endless, Nameless" instead. This version of "Endless, Nameless" was released as the album's hidden track. The band's timing problems were immediately solved when their new drummer, Dave Grohl, took Vig's advice to play with a metronome; it was the only track from the album to be recorded to a click track.

The song's quiet verses and loud choruses dynamic also presented a challenge for Vig, who said that "getting the verses to sound relaxed and the chorus to sound as intense as possible, and make the transitions feel natural and effortless, was a hard one to do." As Vig recalled, "Kurt wanted to be able to play the guitar very ... not methodical—it needed to have this space." The dark sound of the distorted guitar was achieved by using a Big Muff fuzzbox played through a Fender Bassman bass amplifier, recorded with what Vig believes was an U47 microphone that he usually used to record bass guitar. The vocals for the song's verses were recorded in two takes, with the second take being used as the master vocal track, although Vig used the second line of the second verse from take one. The chorus vocals were quickly recorded and double-tracked after.

== Post-Nevermind ==
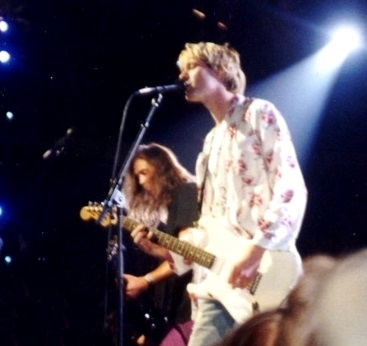
Nirvana performing "Lithium" at the 1992 MTV Video Music Awards.

"Lithium" was performed live at the 1992 MTV Video Music Awards on September 9, 1992, in Los Angeles. Cobain had wanted to play the then-unreleased song "Rape Me" instead, but this was met with resistance from MTV, who wanted the band to play "Smells Like Teen Spirit," and were possibly wary of the newer song's controversial title and lyrics. Cobain agreed to play "Lithium" as a compromise, over concerns that not playing the show might lead to MTV boycotting other acts on their label, Gold Mountain, or firing their friend at the station, Amy Finnerty. "We didn't want to fuck everything up for everyone so we decided to play 'Lithium,'" Cobain explained in the 1993 Nirvana biography, Come As You Are: The Story of Nirvana. "Instead of bowing out and keeping our dignity, we decided to get fucked in the ass." The performance, which featured Cobain playing a short part of "Rape Me" at the beginning "just to give [MTV] a little heart palpitation," ended with Nirvana bassist Krist Novoselic being struck by his bass after throwing it into the air and attempting to catch it unsuccessfully.

The final live version of "Lithium" was at Nirvana's last show, on March 1, 1994, at Terminal 1 in Munich, Germany.

== Composition ==
=== Music ===
"Lithium" is a grunge, alternative rock, and punk rock song that runs for a duration of four minutes and sixteen seconds. According to the sheet music published at Musicnotes.com by BMG Rights Management, it is written in the time signature of common time, with a moderate tempo of 124 beats per minute. "Lithium" is composed in the key of D major, with guitars tuned down a whole tone, and chord shapes resembling chords in the key of E major, while Kurt Cobain's vocal range spans one octave and three notes, from the low-note of C_{3} to the high-note of F_{4}. The intro, verses, and chorus have a basic chord sequence of D^{5}–F♯^{5}–B^{5}–G^{5}–B♭^{5}–C^{5}–A^{5}–C^{5} and alternates between the chords G^{5} and B♭^{5} during the bridge. A transition from the bridge to the main chord sequence consists of a bar of C^{5} and a bar of A^{5}. The sheet music makes no reference to the lowered tuning of the guitars and (inaccurately) shows the E major key signature.

The arrangement is representative of the musical style Nirvana had developed during work on Nevermind, alternating between quiet and loud sections. In the song, Cobain fingers chord shapes on his guitar but varies between playing single notes and double stops on the instrument, giving the track a loose feel. The song opens with bouncing guitar strums before Cobain starts singing his lines in an almost whispered manner. His voice retains a measured calm during the verses, where low, open guitar lines trace the outline of the song's melody. During the chorus, Cobain shouts "Ye-eh-eh-eh-eh" over five notes and distorted, towering riffs. Cobain's thick, surging rhythm guitar meshes with Novoselic's melodic bass and Grohl's intense, snappy drumming.

=== Lyrics ===
According to Cobain, "Lithium" was "one of those songs I actually did finish while trying to write it instead of taking pieces of my poetry and other things".

In his 1993 biography Come As You Are: The Story of Nirvana, Michael Azerrad described the song's title as "an update on Marx's description of religion as the 'opiate of the masses.'" Gillian G. Gaar described it as "a song whose sing-along melody typically masks the disturbing quality of the lyric, which touches on the solace one can find in religion or madness." As Cobain explained, "In the song, a guy’s lost his girl and his friends and he’s brooding. He’s decided to find God before he kills himself. It’s hard for me to understand the need for a vice like [religion] but I can appreciate it too. People need vices."

In Come As You Are, Cobain acknowledged that the song might have been inspired in part by the time he spent living with his friend Jesse Reed and his born-again Christian parents. Cobain told Azerrad that he wasn't necessarily anti-religion, saying that "I've always felt that some people should have religion in their lives ... That's fine. If it's going to save someone, it's okay. And the person in ['Lithium'] needed it."

== Release and reception ==
Professional ratings
Review scores
Source	Rating
AllMusic	4/5 stars

"Lithium" was released as the third single from Nevermind on July 13, 1992. Featuring a cover photo by Cobain, the single contained a sonogram of the musician's then-unborn child Frances Bean Cobain, as well as full lyrics for all the songs on Nevermind. Cassette, CD, 12-inch vinyl, and British 12-inch vinyl picture disc editions included "Curmudgeon" and a live version of "Been a Son" (performed on Halloween the previous year) as B-sides. The British 7-inch and cassette featured only "Curmudgeon" as an extra track, while the UK CD release added a cover of the Wipers' "D-7" recorded for BBC Radio 1 disc jockey John Peel's program in 1990.

John Sullivan for New York Magazine described "Lithium" as a "flawlessly crafted hit." AllMusic's Mark Demming remarked, "For all the sound and fury of Nirvana's epochal album, Nevermind, it's significant that the album's best and most affecting song is also among the quietest. ... The liberating force of Nirvana's inspired anger was rarely more powerful than in the service of this song." Time music critic Christopher Farley praised the song for its "gorgeous guitar hooks," writing, "Its punk-inspired, we-couldn't-care-less ethos seemed to reflect the restless apathy some young people felt toward their times."

"Lithium" was ranked the 20th best single of the year in the Village Voice Pazz & Jop critics' poll, tying with singles by Ministry, Lisa Stansfield, and Utah Saints In 1993, it was voted at number 50 on Spin's Top 100 Songs of Our Time. In Israel, it was voted in at number 4 on the IBA's "Voice of Israel" singles chart.

In 2012, NME ranked "Lithium" at number 52 on its list of the "100 Best Tracks Of The '90s". In 2013, it was voted first "by a pretty comfortable margin" in Rolling Stone's reader's poll of "The 10 Best Nirvana Songs." In 2019, the song was placed at number seven on Rolling Stone's ranking of 102 Nirvana songs. In 2023, Stephen Thomas Erlewine ranked it fifth on the A.V. Club's "Essential Nirvana: Their 30 greatest songs, ranked" list.

According to Nielsen Music's year-end report for 2019, "Lithium" was the tenth most-played song of the decade on mainstream rock radio with 123,000 spins. All of the songs in the top 10 were from the 1990s.

=== Legacy ===
On April 10, 2014, "Lithium" was performed by surviving Nirvana members Grohl, Novoselic and Pat Smear, with lead vocals and guitar by American rock musician St. Vincent, at the band's Rock and Roll Hall of Fame induction ceremony at Barclays Center in Brooklyn, New York.

"Lithium" has been used as the goal song for Seattle's National Hockey League (NHL) team, the Seattle Kraken, since their inaugural season.

== Live promotional versions ==
A live version of "Lithium," recorded at the Paradiso in Amsterdam, Netherlands on November 25, 1991, was released as a promotional single in Holland in 1996, for the live compilation From the Muddy Banks of the Wishkah, released in October 1996. The full show was released on Blu-ray and CD on the 30th anniversary "Super Deluxe" version of Nevermind on November 12, 2021.

In October 2021, another live version, recorded at The Palace in Melbourne, Australia, on February 1, 1992, was released as a streaming single ahead of its appearance on the 30th anniversary edition of the Nevermind. Reviewing the release for Rolling Stone, Kory Grow wrote that "the real magic in the box set manifests during the band's Melbourne, Australia, gig on Feb. 1, 1992. Cobain urges the crowd to sing along with him on 'Lithium' — a track that hadn't even come out as a single yet — and the audience nearly drowns him out, gleefully belting his lyrics about feeling simultaneously happy and ugly and not caring who knows it. Cobain sounds so into it, he forgot to kick on his distortion pedal for the song's primal 'yeah' chorus".

A live version of the song recorded during the band's headlining set at the Reading Festival in Reading, England, on August 30, 1992, was released as a promotional single from the album Live at Reading, released in November 2009. On Live at Reading, the DVD has compressed remixed stereo audio and the CD version has uncompressed soundboard audio taken from the pro-shot video. Video of this version first appeared on the 1994 home movie Live! Tonight! Sold Out!!, although the audio was previously unreleased. The pro-shot video on Live! Tonight! Sold Out!! used soundboard audio for the song. In the liner notes to From the Muddy Banks of the Wishkah, Novoselic wrote that "hearing tens of thousands of people sing along with [the Reading version of] 'Lithium' was a very cool moment in the history of the band". It was broadcast on ABC's In Concert TV series on January 29, 1993. According to a Nirvana bootleg recordings reviewer, "The [Reading Festival] version of "Lithium" with the crowd singing along is one of the great Rock & Roll moments of the Nineties and should have appeared on the official "Muddy Banks" live album".

== Music video ==
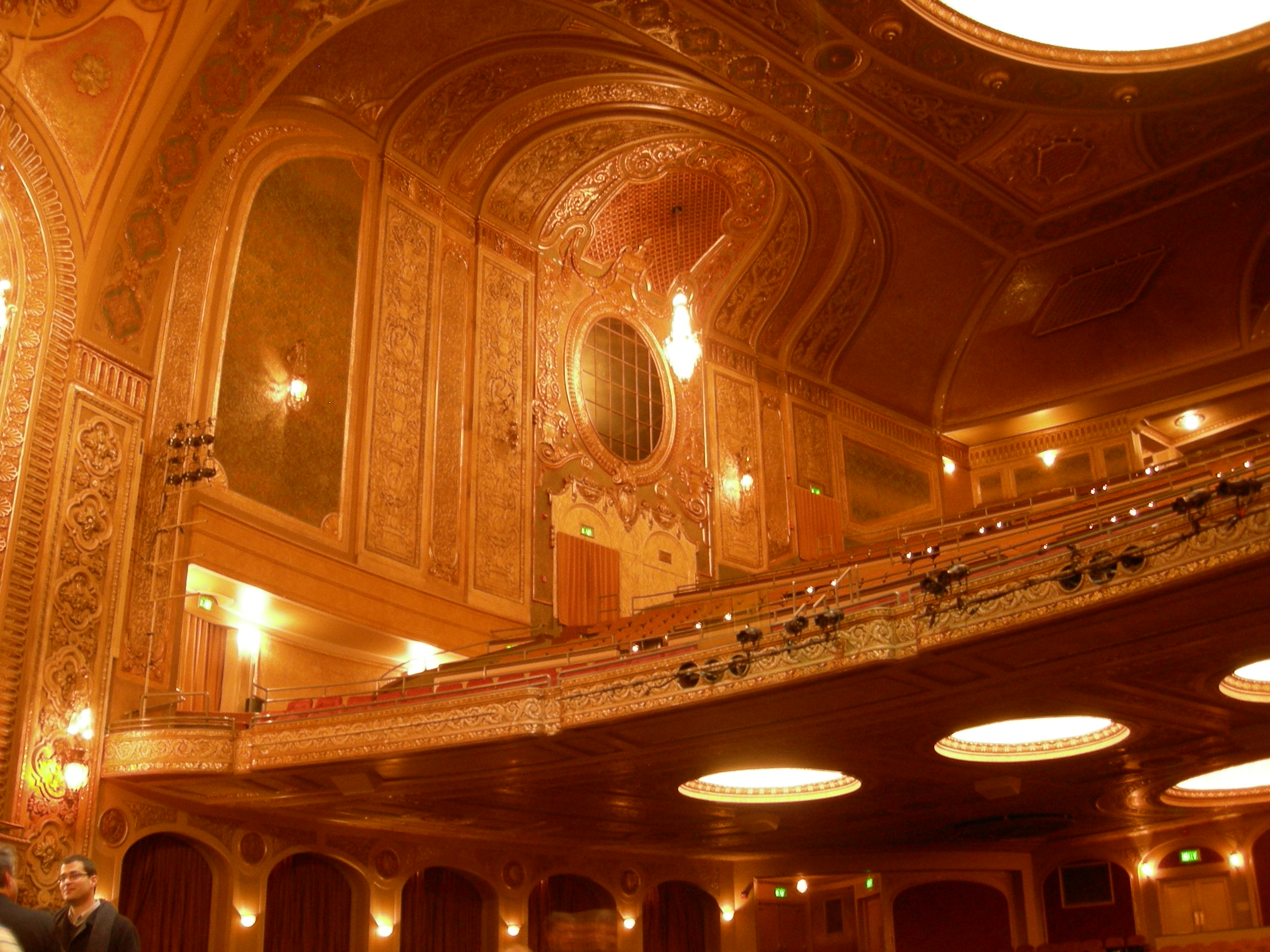
The music video for "Lithium" draws largely on footage from the band's October 31, 1991 performance at the Paramount Theatre in Seattle. The full performance has since been released on video and as an album.

The music video for "Lithium" was the second of four Nirvana videos directed by Kevin Kerslake, who had worked with the band on the video for their previous single, "Come as You Are," and later directed the videos for "In Bloom" and "Sliver".

The video featured a collage of live footage from the completed but then-unreleased home movie 1991: The Year Punk Broke, which documented the band's two-week European tour with Sonic Youth, and from their show at the Paramount Theatre in Seattle on October 31, 1991. The footage from The Year Punk Broke was filmed at the 1991 Reading Festival on August 23, 1991, and at De Doelen in Rotterdam, Netherlands on September 1, 1991. According to Nirvana's manager, Danny Goldberg, in his 2019 Cobain biography Serving the Servant, Sonic Youth's vocalist and bassist Kim Gordon initially opposed the inclusion of one scene from the film, which featured Cobain being carried on Novoselic's shoulders, but eventually relented after being reminded that Nirvana had allowed Sonic Youth to use five live performances in the film for free. As Goldberg explained, Gordon "was in love with the shot" and believed its inclusion in a music video would lessen its impact in the upcoming film. The "Lithium" video also featured Cobain jumping into the drum set at the end of the Reading set, during "Endless, Nameless", which led to him dislocating his arm. The video was placed into heavy rotation on MTV in the US, and into active rotation on MTV Europe. It was also played on MTV Australia, Rage and Video Smash Hits in Australia.

According to Michael Azerrad in Come as You Are, Cobain's original idea for a "Lithium" video was an animated film about a girl who lived in a house in a forest. The story was to feature the girl, named Preggo, finding a pile of eggs in her closet and putting them in a train of three wagons that she would then wheel through the forest until arriving at a king's castle. By this time, all but one of the eggs have cracked, and she would place the remaining egg on a book on the lap of the king, asleep on his throne. The king would then awaken and open his legs, and the book would slide shut between them, crushing the egg. This concept was abandoned when Cobain and Kerslake learned that the animation would take four months to produce, and the live collage was made instead. Azerrad wrote that while the final video was "enlivened by Kerslake's neat trick of using more violent footage during the quiet parts of the song and vice versa," it "was something of a disappointment from a band and a song that promised so much."

== Accolades ==
Accolades for "Lithium"
Year	Publication	Country	Accolade	Rank
1999	Kerrang!	United Kingdom	100 Greatest Rock Tracks Ever!	20
2013	Rolling Stone	United States	Readers’ Poll: The 10 Best Nirvana Songs	1
2023	The A.V. Club	United States	Essential Nirvana: Their 30 greatest songs, ranked	5

== Track listings ==
All songs were written by Nirvana, except where noted.

US 12-inch, cassette, CD, and UK 12-inch vinyl picture disc

1. "Lithium" – 4:16
2. "Been a Son" (live - Seattle - October 31, 1991) – 2:14
3. "Curmudgeon" – 2:58

UK 7-inch vinyl and cassette

1. "Lithium" – 4:16
2. "Curmudgeon" – 2:58

UK CD

1. "Lithium" – 4:16
2. "Been a Son" (live) – 2:14
3. "Curmudgeon" – 2:58
4. "D-7" (John Peel Radio Session) (Greg Sage) – 3:45

== Personnel ==
Personnel adapted from Nevermind liner notes

Nirvana

- Kurt Cobain – guitar, vocals
- Krist Novoselic – bass guitar
- Dave Grohl – drums

Technical Personnel

- Butch Vig – producer, engineer
- Nirvana – producer, engineer

== Charts ==
=== Weekly charts ===
Weekly chart performance for "Lithium"
Chart (1992–1993)	Peak position
Australia (ARIA)	53
Australia Alternative (ARIA)	7
Belgium (Ultratop 50 Flanders)	28
Belgium (VRT Top 30 Flanders)	18
Canada Top Singles (RPM)	83
Canada Contemporary Album Radio (The Record)	30
Denmark (Hitlisten); 1993 re-entry peak, original 1992 Top 30 peak unavailable	42
European Hot 100 Singles (Music & Media)	19
Europe West Airplay (Music & Media)	20
Finland (The Official Finnish Charts)	1
Ireland (IRMA)	5
Italy (Musica e dischi)	16
Netherlands (Dutch Top 40)	16
Netherlands (Single Top 100)	17
New Zealand (Recorded Music NZ)	28
Portugal (AFP)	4
Spain (AFYVE)	13
Sweden Airplay (Music & Media)	10
UK Network Singles (MRIB)	14
UK Singles (Official Charts)	11
UK Airplay (ERA)	35
US Billboard Hot 100	64
US Mainstream Rock Airplay (Billboard)	16
US Alternative Airplay (Billboard)	25
US Top 100 Pop Singles (Cashbox)	48
US AOR Tracks (Radio & Records)	7

Chart (1995–1996)	Peak position
Denmark (Tracklisten); Charted on the singles chart as part of the Singles box set	5
France (SNEP); Charted on the singles chart as part of the Singles box set	17

=== Year-end charts ===
Year-end chart performance for "Lithium"
Chart (1992)	Position
Italy (Musica e dischi)	98
US AOR Tracks (Radio & Records)	50

=== Decade-end charts ===
Decade-end chart performance for "Lithium"
Chart (2010–2019)	Position
US Mainstream Rock (Nielsen Music)	10

== Certifications ==
Certifications and sales for "Lithium"
Region	Certification	Certified units/sales
Australia (ARIA)	3× Platinum	210,000^{‡}
Denmark (IFPI Danmark)	Gold	45,000^{‡}
Italy (FIMI) Sales since 2009	Gold	35,000^{‡}
New Zealand (RMNZ)	2× Platinum	60,000^{‡}
Spain (Promusicae)	Gold	30,000^{‡}
United Kingdom (BPI) Sales since 2004	Platinum	600,000^{‡}
United States (RIAA)	3× Platinum	3,000,000^{‡}
^{‡} Sales+streaming figures based on certification alone.

== Other releases ==
- The studio version recorded at Smart Studios in Madison in April 1990 was released in September 2011, when all eight songs recorded at the sessions appeared on disc two of the 20th-anniversary "Deluxe" and "Super Deluxe" versions of Nevermind.
- The solo acoustic version performed by Cobain on the Boy Meets Girl show in Olympia on September 25, 1990, appeared on the Nirvana box set, With the Lights Out, in November 2005. It was re-released on the compilation, Sliver: The Best of the Box, in November 2005.
- The 20th anniversary "Super Deluxe" version of Nevermind also featured early "Devonshire" mixes for most of the album, including "Lithium."
- A live version, recorded on October 31, 1991, at the Paramount Theatre in Seattle, Washington, appeared on Live at the Paramount, released on DVD and Blu-Ray in September 2011.
- A brief clip of the band performing the song live at the Astoria Theatre in London, England on November 5, 1991, appears on Live! Tonight!! Sold Out!!. The clip, which appears immediately before the Reading version, features Cobain singing the opening lines of the song before stopping and telling the audience to wait while he starts over.
- Along with the Paradiso and Palace versions, two other live versions of "Lithium" appeared on the 30th anniversary "Super Deluxe" version of Nevermind, from the band's performances at Del Mar Fairgrounds in Del Mar, California on December 28, 1991, and at the Nakano Sunplaza in Tokyo, Japan on February 19, 1992.
- A live version, recorded on December 13, 1993, at Pier 48 in Seattle, Washington, appeared on the live video Live and Loud, released on DVD in September 2011. An edited version of the show, including "Lithium," was first broadcast on MTV, which filmed the concert, on December 31, 1993.
- Two live versions of "Lithium," from the band's shows at the Great Western Forum in Inglewood, California, on December 30, 1993, and at the Seattle Center Arena in Seattle, on January 7, 1994, appear on the 30th anniversary "Super Deluxe" reissue of Nirvana's final studio album, In Utero, released in October 2023.

== Cover versions ==
Cover versions of the song have been performed by choral rock band The Polyphonic Spree (which appeared in the 2015 film The Big Short), The Vaselines, Rockabye Baby! (as a lullaby), a British band named Nirvana, Man with a Mission and jazz quartet The Bad Plus.

A cover version by Bruce Lash appears in the 2008 comedy-drama film Marley & Me, starring Owen Wilson and Jennifer Aniston.
