= Singles (box set) =

1995 Nirvana box set

Box set by Nirvana
- Released: November 6, 1995
- Recorded: 1991–1993
- Genres: Grunge, alternative rock
- Length: 70:29
- Label: Geffen
- Producer: Various

Nirvana chronology
MTV Unplugged in New York (1994)	Singles (1995)	From the Muddy Banks of the Wishkah (1996)

Professional ratings
Review scores
Source	Rating
AllMusic	3/5 stars
The Encyclopedia of Popular Music	4/5 stars

Singles is a box set by the American rock band Nirvana, released in Europe in November 1995.

== Background ==
The box set was produced in response to unofficial versions of it that had been released previously.

== Content ==
The box set contains all six CD singles from the band's two Geffen Records-released studio albums, Nevermind, released in September 1991, and In Utero, released in September 1993. It includes "Smells Like Teen Spirit", "Come as You Are", "Lithium" and "In Bloom", released from 1991 to 1992 to promote Nevermind, and "Heart-Shaped Box" and the double A-side "All Apologies"/"Rape Me", released in 1993 to promote In Utero. It does not include the planned third In Utero single, "Pennyroyal Tea", which was canceled after the death of vocalist and guitarist Kurt Cobain in April 1994.

Although released in Europe, the Nevermind singles are the American versions, with the "Smells Like Teen Spirit" single lacking the studio version of "Drain You," and the "Lithium" single lacking the band's cover of the Wipers song "D-7," both of which appeared on the European versions of those singles. "In Bloom" and the two In Utero singles were not released in the US.

All singles appear in slimline jewel cases.

== Promotion ==
The song "Marigold" received some airplay on US alternative and active rock radio in 1996, after it appeared on the import release of the Singles box set as the B-side to the "Heart-Shaped Box" single. KROQ Music Director Lisa Worden, introduced “Marigold” to the radio waves after discovering the B-side on the single in the import box set. The song was then picked up by alternative radio stations in New York, Chicago, and Atlanta. Despite the spontaneous success of the song, Geffen Records and the song writer, Nirvana drummer Dave Grohl, refused to capitalize on it and made it known that copies of the song would not be sent out to radio stations to promote airplay.

== Track listing ==
All tracks written by Kurt Cobain, except when noted.

CD1: "Smells Like Teen Spirit"

1. "Smells Like Teen Spirit" (edit) (Cobain/Grohl/Novoselic) – 4:39
2. "Even in His Youth" – 3:06
3. "Aneurysm" (Cobain/Grohl/Novoselic) – 4:46

CD2: "Come as You Are"

1. "Come as You Are" – 3:39
2. "Endless, Nameless" (Cobain/Grohl/Novoselic) – 6:43
3. "School" [live, Paramount Theatre, Seattle, Washington; October 31, 1991] – 2:31
4. "Drain You" [live, Paramount Theatre, Seattle, Washington; October 31, 1991] – 3:35

CD3: "In Bloom"

1. "In Bloom" – 4:14
2. "Sliver" (Cobain/Novoselic) [live, Del Mar Fairgrounds, Del Mar, California; December 28, 1991] – 2:06
3. "Polly" [live, Del Mar Fairgrounds, Del Mar, California; December 28, 1991] – 2:47

CD4: "Lithium"

1. "Lithium" – 4:16
2. "Been a Son" [live, Paramount Theatre, Seattle, Washington; October 31, 1991] – 2:14
3. "Curmudgeon" – 2:58

CD5: "Heart-Shaped Box"

1. "Heart-Shaped Box" – 4:38
2. "Milk It" – 3:54
3. "Marigold" (Grohl) – 2:34

CD6: "All Apologies/Rape Me"

1. "All Apologies" – 3:47
2. "Rape Me" – 2:51
3. "Moist Vagina" – 3:34

== Personnel ==
Personnel taken from Singles liner notes, except where noted.

Nirvana

- Kurt Cobain – vocals, guitar
- Krist Novoselic – bass
- Dave Grohl – drums, backing vocals; lead vocals and guitar on "Marigold"

Additional musician

- Kera Schaley – cello on "All Apologies"

Production

- Butch Vig – production and engineering on "Smells Like Teen Spirit", "Come As You Are", "Endless, Nameless", "In Bloom" and "Lithium"
- Nirvana – production and engineering on "Smells Like Teen Spirit", "Come As You Are", "Endless, Nameless", "In Bloom", "Lithium" and "Crumudgeon"
- Craig Montgomery – production and engineering on "Even In His Youth" and "Aneurysm"
- Andy Wallace – production and engineering on "School", "Drain You", "Sliver", "Polly" and "Been A Son"; mixing on "Smells Like Teen Spirit", "Even In His Youth", "Aneurysm", "Come As You Are", "Endless, Nameless", "School", "Drain You", "In Bloom", "Sliver", "Polly", "Lithium" and "Been A Son"
- Barrett Jones – production and engineering on "Crumudgeon"
- Steve Albini – recording on "Heart-Shaped Box", "Milk It", "Marigold", "All Apologies", "Rape Me" and "Moist Vagina"
- Scott Litt – additional mixing on "Heart-Shaped Box" and "All Apologies"

Artwork

- Kurt Cobain – photography on "Lithium" and "Heart-Shaped Box" CDs, art direction on "Heart-Shaped Box" CD
- Greg Strata – design on "Smells Like Teen Spirit" CD
- Robert Fisher – art direction on "Come As You Are" and "Heart-Shaped Box" CDs, design on "In Bloom", "Lithium", "Heart-Shaped Box" and "All Apologies" CDs, layout on "Heart-Shaped Box" CD
- David Skernick – cover photo on "In Bloom" CD
- Charles Peterson – back photography on "Heart-Shaped Box" CD

== Chart performance ==
Despite being a box set of six separate CD singles the release was eligible to chart on the Danish Singles Chart, remaining in the Top 20 for 11 weeks and peaking at number 5. The release was also eligible to chart on the French Singles Chart, remaining on the chart for 8 weeks and peaking at number 17. The release peaked at number 15 on the Australian Kent Music album chart and remained on the chart for a total of twelve weeks.

== Charts ==
Singles was eligible to chart on the singles chart in Denmark and France, and on the albums chart in the United Kingdom, and Australia.

Singles charts

Chart (1995–1996)	Peak position
Denmark (Tracklisten)	5
European Hot 100 Singles (Music & Media)	55
France (SNEP)	17

Album charts

Chart (1995)	Peak position
Australia (Kent Music Report)	15
UK (Official Charts Company)	101
UK Rock & Metal Albums (Official Charts)	10
