= Come as You Are (Nirvana song) =

1992 single by Nirvana

Single by Nirvana

from the album Nevermind
- B-side: "Endless, Nameless" (excluding US); "Drain You" (live); "School" (live)
- Released: February 18, 1992
- Recorded: May 1991
- Studio: Sound City (Van Nuys, California)
- Genre: Grunge; alternative rock
- Length: 3:38
- Label: DGC
- Songwriter: Kurt Cobain (Note: On the original release of Nevermind, the lyrics were credited to Cobain while the music was credited to the whole band. Later releases credit this song solely to Cobain.)
- Producers: Butch Vig; Nirvana

Nirvana singles chronology
"On a Plain" (1991)	"Come as You Are" (1992)	"Lithium" (1992)

Music video
- "Come as You Are" on YouTube

"Come as You Are" is a song by American rock band Nirvana, written by frontman and guitarist Kurt Cobain. It is the third track and the second single from the band's second studio album Nevermind (1991), with the single released on February 18, 1992. It was the band's second and final American Top 40 hit, reaching number 32 on the Billboard Hot 100. It was also their second UK Top 10 hit, reaching number 9 on the UK Singles Chart. The single reached the Top 10 in nine countries and the Top 40 in ten additional countries.

The unexpected success of the album's lead single, "Smells Like Teen Spirit", propelled Nirvana to mainstream success, with Nevermind being released two weeks later. Following the album's release, the band and its management company debated whether to release "Come as You Are" or "In Bloom" as the next single from the album due to Cobain's concerns over the similarity of the former with the song "Eighties" (1984) by English post-punk band Killing Joke. After some persuasion by the management, Cobain agreed to release "Come as You Are" as the second single because of its commercial potential. Killing Joke was upset over the song and there were rumors that a lawsuit had been filed alleging copyright infringement, though the suit never materialized. Killing Joke guitarist Geordie Walker was reportedly upset about the whole situation and felt that Nirvana handled the matter poorly. Similarities between "Come as You Are" and "Life Goes On" by English punk band the Damned have also been noted.

The music video for "Come as You Are" was directed by Kevin Kerslake, who drew inspiration for it from the cover artwork of Nevermind. Rolling Stone ranked "Come as You Are" 452nd on its list of "The 500 Greatest Songs of All Time" in 2010, and the song placed 445th on the 2021 edition of the list.

== Background and recording ==
"Come as You Are" was one of the few new songs Nirvana recorded onto the rehearsal tape the group sent to producer Butch Vig prior to the recording of Nevermind in 1991. The group recorded the song with Vig during album sessions at Sound City Studios in Van Nuys, California, in early 1991. Cobain recorded his guitar solo in two takes, as well as three takes of vocals, of which the first was used. Vig then asked Cobain to double track his vocals throughout the entire song. During the harmony overdub session, Cobain accidentally sang the phrase "No, I don't have a gun", appearing the fourth time he sings the word "memoria" after the guitar solo. When this mistake was discovered, Cobain decided to keep it in the final recording. Vig sampled Cobain singing "memoria" from the middle of the song and placed it in the background of the song near the end twice. The band also performed an acoustic version of the song during their MTV Unplugged performance on November 18, 1993. The recording later appeared on the live album of the performance, released about a year later in November 1994.

== Composition and lyrics ==
"Come as You Are" is an alternative rock song that lasts for a duration of three minutes and thirty-eight seconds. According to the sheet music published at Musicnotes.com by BMG Rights Management, it is written in the time signature of common time, with a heavy rock tempo of 120 beats per minute. "Come as You Are" is composed in the key of E minor, and Kurt Cobain's vocal range spans one octave and one note, from a low of E_{3} to a high of F♯_{4}. The song alternates between the chords of E^{5} and D^{5} during the verses and Esus^{4} and G in the pre-chorus, while in the chorus it changes to the chord progression of A–C^{5}. It begins with Cobain playing an unaccompanied guitar riff for eight seconds. Cobain used an Electro-Harmonix Small Clone guitar chorus pedal to give his instrument a "watery" or "echoey" tone during the verses and pre-choruses, and as a result the pedal has been associated with the song ever since. He is joined by the rest of the band for the first verse, which is moody and subdued. Once the band reaches the chorus, the song reaches full volume. The shift in dynamics is a technique Nirvana used on many of its songs. The song features one of Cobain's longest guitar solos. "Kurt really did not play a lot of solos," Vig said. "This one is more of a melodic part based on the vocal melody. It's not trying to show off pyrotechnics. It complements the melody of the song."

"Come as You Are"
Cobain uses a chorus pedal when playing his guitar, creating a "watery" effect.

Many have speculated that the song is about heroin, which Cobain was struggling with at the time of writing and recording. The lyrics "Come doused in mud, soaked in bleach" speak directly to a Seattle-area HIV prevention campaign from the time which encouraged addicts to sterilize their needles with bleach before using them with the tagline "If doused in mud, soak in bleach". The lyrics "As a friend, as a trend, as a known enemy", for some, were a further allegory for addiction to the drug. After Cobain's death, Sub Pop records approached G. Alan Marlatt at the University of Washington to set up a memorial fund to establish an addiction treatment center titled the "Come as You Are" center, but the funding fell through after the record label was sold to Warner Music Group.

Cobain described the lyrics of "Come as You Are" as contradictory, and said the song was about "people and what they're expected to act like." Pointing to the line "Take your time, hurry up, choice is yours, don't be late," essayist Catherine J. Creswell writes that in Cobain's lyrics, "[p]hrases clump into strings of empty clichés whose own ostensible meaning is forced into contradictions or simple rhyme sound."

In light of Cobain's suicide in 1994, AllMusic's Mark Deming suggests that hearing "Cobain sing 'and I swear that I don't have a gun' gives 'Come as You Are' an edge it was never meant to have when [Nevermind] was first released in 1991." Deming reasons that the "I don't have a gun" lyric is Cobain's "attempt to reassure listeners that ... his target is the world at large rather than the individuals in it, and that there was still room in this damaged world for everyone." Others have suggested the lyrics regarding the "gun" are metaphors for escapism and turmoil found in heroin usage.

== Release ==
Professional ratings
Review scores
Source	Rating
AllMusic	3/5 stars

Wary of the similarity between the main riff of "Come as You Are" and English post-punk band Killing Joke's 1985 single "Eighties", Nirvana and its management were unsure about releasing the song as the second single from Nevermind. Danny Goldberg, head of Nirvana's management Gold Mountain, later revealed that "[w]e couldn't decide between 'Come as You Are' and 'In Bloom.' Kurt was nervous about 'Come as You Are' because it was too similar to a Killing Joke song but we all thought it was still the better song to go with. And, he was right, Killing Joke later did complain about it." Nirvana biographer Everett True writes that "Come as You Are" was eventually chosen for release as a single because "Goldberg favoured the more obviously commercial song".

It was anticipated that the first single from Nevermind, "Smells Like Teen Spirit", would be a "base-building alternative cut", while "Come as You Are" would be able to cross over into other radio formats. However, "Smells Like Teen Spirit" became a surprise hit and boosted the band's popularity, whereas "Come as You Are" served to maintain it. After its release as a single in the US on February 18, 1992, "Come as You Are" peaked at number 32 on the Billboard Hot 100. The single stayed on the chart for 18 weeks. The song also reached number three on the Billboard Mainstream and Modern Rock Tracks charts. The single also broke the top 10 of the UK Singles Chart, peaking at the ninth spot, where it was also the week's highest new entry. In Israel, it was voted in at number 3 on the IBA's "Voice of Israel" singles chart. The song ranked number 82 in Blender's "The 500 Greatest Songs Since You Were Born", and 452nd on Rolling Stone's "The 500 Greatest Songs of All Time". In 2019, the song was placed at number 17 on Rolling Stone's ranking of all 102 Nirvana songs.

Although the members of Killing Joke claimed the main guitar riff of "Come as You Are" plagiarized the riff of "Eighties", the band reportedly did not file a copyright infringement lawsuit, which Rolling Stone magazine attributed to "personal and financial reasons". However, conflicting reports state that Killing Joke did in fact file a lawsuit, but that it was either thrown out of court or dropped following Cobain's death. In a December 1994 interview, Geordie Walker, Killing Joke's guitarist, said that the band was "very pissed off about [the song being plagiarized], but it's obvious to everyone. We had two separate musicologists' reports saying it was. Our publisher sent their publisher a letter saying it was and they went 'Boo, never heard of ya!', but the hysterical thing about Nirvana saying they'd never heard of us was that they'd already sent us a Christmas card!"

Later it was also noted that a third song, "Life Goes On", from English punk band the Damned's 1982 album Strawberries, pre-dated both and contained a similar riff to both songs.

In 1999, "Come as You Are" was voted number 49 in Kerrang! magazine's "100 Greatest Rock Tracks Ever!". As of April 2016, according to Business Insider, "Come as You Are" was the sixth most streamed song from the 1990s on Spotify. According to Nielsen Music's year-end report for 2019, "Come as You Are" was the third most-played song of the decade on mainstream rock radio with 134,000 spins. All of the songs in the top 10 were from the 1990s. The song had been streamed two billion times on Spotify by April 2026.

== Music video ==
The music video was directed by Kevin Kerslake, who later directed the videos for "Lithium", "In Bloom", and "Sliver", as well as the music video for Pantera's "This Love". After the unsatisfactory experience filming the "Smells Like Teen Spirit" video with Samuel Bayer, Cobain selected Kerslake due to his impressionistic style. Cobain was unable to formulate any ideas beyond homaging the Nevermind album cover and including "a lot of purples and reds", so he let Kerslake conceptualize the video. Filming took place from January 16 to 20, 1992. The band shot outdoor footage in Wattles Park in Hollywood Hills a few days prior to the main video shoot. This took place in an Air National Guard hangar at Van Nuys Airport. Kerslake projected this footage in the background of many shots in the main part of the video.

The video features the band in a dark room, where the appearance of falling water in front of the band distorts and blurs the band members' forms (an idea suggested by Cobain). Throughout the video, clips such as cells multiplying at an incredible rate and an unborn organism in its embryonic stages are shown. The video also features Cobain swinging violently on a chandelier as water begins to flow into the room as well as a dog wearing a cone collar trying to go down stairs, a baby swimming underwater (a reference to the cover of Nevermind), and a pistol sinking. Towards the end, a clip of the band appears, with Cobain in the front, lying on the ground and kissing the camera.

The music video was placed into heavy rotation on MTV in the US. It was placed into the Buzz Bin on MTV Europe, before being placed into active and heavy rotation. It was also played on MTV Australia, Rage and Video Smash Hits in Australia.

In his 2021 autobiography, The Storyteller, Dave Grohl wrote that he can no longer watch the video because it reminds him of what a bad state Cobain was in at the time due to his heroin abuse.

== Legacy ==
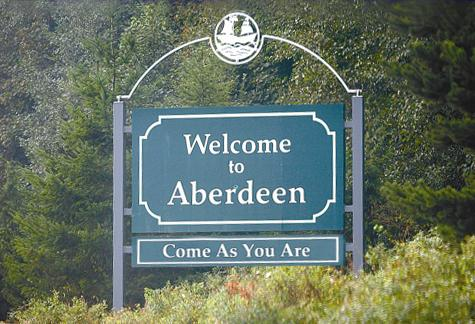
A tribute to Kurt Cobain on Aberdeen's welcome sign

In 2005, a sign was put up in Cobain's hometown of Aberdeen, Washington, that reads "Welcome to Aberdeen: Come As You Are" as a tribute to Cobain. The sign was paid for and created by the Kurt Cobain Memorial Committee, a non-profit organization created in May 2004 to honor Cobain. Founded by author Jeff Burlingame and Aberdeen City Councilman Paul Fritts, the committee also plans to create a Kurt Cobain Memorial Park and a youth center in Aberdeen.

The song appears in two scenes of Definitely, Maybe, a 2008 film starring Ryan Reynolds, and is a thematic element.

The 2016 film As You Are was named after the Nirvana track. The plot "revolves around a trio of high schoolers in the 1990s, trying to find their way through the difficult maze of adolescence."

A cover of the song, performed by Civil Twilight, appears in the end scene of the Defiance episode Down in the Ground Where the Dead Men Go. Elvis impersonator Jim "The King" Brown also covered the song on his 1998 album Gravelands, as did Caetano Veloso on his 2004 album A Foreign Sound.

A remix of the song was used in trailers for Marvel's 2017 Netflix series The Defenders. It also made an appearance in the 2019 film Captain Marvel, and subsequently peaked at number 11 on the Billboard Hot Rock Songs chart with a 267 percent increase to 2,000 downloads sold and a 30 percent increase to 2.8 million US streams in the week ending March 14, 2019.

The song "Adam's Song" by Blink-182 references "Come as You Are". While "Come as You Are" features the lyrics "Take your time, hurry up, the choice is yours, don't be late", "Adam's Song", in turn, features the lyrics "I took my time, I hurried up, the choice was mine, I didn't think enough".

The song was also featured in the closing credits of the Season 2 finale of the Apple TV+ alternative history series For All Mankind.

"Come As You Are (House Mix)" is an electronic tribute with trumpeter Maurice "Mobetta" Brown and house music DJ Chip E. from Nirvana Reimagined as House and Techno by producers Jonathan Hay and Cain McKnight.

The song was used in the Luca Guadagnino film Queer, during the introduction of the character Eugene Allerton (played by Drew Starkey).

== Track listing ==
UK 7" single (DGCS 7)

1. "Come as You Are" – 3:38
2. "Endless, Nameless" – 6:40

US 7" single (DGCS7-19120-A)

1. "Come as You Are" – 3:38
2. "Drain You" (live) – 3:35

UK 12" single (DGCT 7)

1. "Come as You Are" – 3:38
2. "Endless, Nameless" – 6:40
3. "Drain You" (live) – 3:35

UK 12" picture disc (DGCTP 7)

1. "Come as You Are" – 3:38
2. "Endless, Nameless" – 6:40
3. "School" (live) – 2:31

UK CD single (GED 21715)

1. "Come as You Are" – 3:38
2. "Endless, Nameless" – 6:40
3. "School" (live) – 2:31
4. "Drain You" (live) – 3:35

US CD single (DGCDS-21707)

1. "Come as You Are" – 3:38
2. "School" (live) – 2:31
3. "Drain You" (live) – 3:35

Japanese mini CD single (MVDG-8)

1. "Come as You Are" – 3:38
2. "Endless, Nameless" – 6:40

US cassette single (DGCCS-19120)

1. "Come as You Are" – 3:38
2. "Drain You" (live) – 3:35

Australian cassette single (DGCCS19065)

1. "Come as You Are" – 3:38
2. "Endless, Nameless" – 6:40

== Personnel ==
Personnel adapted from Nevermind liner notes

Nirvana

- Kurt Cobain – guitar, vocals
- Krist Novoselic – bass guitar
- Dave Grohl – drums

Technical

- Butch Vig – recording, mixing engineer, producer
- Nirvana – producer, engineer

== Charts ==
=== Weekly charts ===
1992–1993 weekly chart performance for "Come as You Are"
Chart (1992–1993)	Peak position
Australia (ARIA)	25
Australia Alternative (ARIA)	1
Austria (Ö3 Austria Top 40)	28
Belgium (IFPI Belgium)	5
Belgium (Ultratop 50 Flanders)	15
Belgium (VRT Top 30 Flanders)	12
Canada Top Singles (RPM)	27
Canada Contemporary Hit Radio (The Record)	33
Canada Contemporary Album Radio (The Record)	14
Denmark (Hitlisten)	9
Denmark (ANR North Jutland)	17
European Hot 100 Singles (Music & Media)	15
European Hit Radio Top 40 (Music & Media)	23
Finland (The Official Finnish Charts)	8
France (SNEP)	12
Germany (GfK)	22
Greece (Virgin)	5
Ireland (IRMA)	7
Italy (Musica e dischi)	8
Netherlands (Dutch Top 40)	14
Netherlands (Single Top 100)	16
New Zealand (Recorded Music NZ)	3
Portugal (AFP)	8
Spain (AFYVE)	16
Sweden (Sverigetopplistan)	24
Switzerland (Schweizer Hitparade)	21
UK Network Singles (MRIB)	10
UK Singles (Official Charts)	9
UK Airplay (ERA)	19
US Billboard Hot 100	32
US Alternative Airplay (Billboard)	3
US Mainstream Rock Airplay (Billboard)	3
US Top 100 Pop Singles (Cash Box)	19
US AOR Tracks (Radio & Records)	2

1995–1996 weekly chart performance for "Come as You Are"
Chart (1995–1996)	Peak position
Denmark (Tracklisten) Charted as part of the Singles box set	5

2019 weekly chart performance for "Come as You Are"
Chart (2019)	Peak position
US Hot Rock & Alternative Songs (Billboard)	11

2025–2026 weekly chart performance for "Come as You Are"
Chart (2025–2026)	Peak position
Global 200 (Billboard)	155

=== Year-end charts ===
Year-end chart performance for "Come as You Are"
Chart (1992)	Position
Eurochart Hot 100 Singles (Music & Media)	91
Italy (Musica e dischi)	42
US Album Rock Tracks (Billboard)	5
US Modern Rock Tracks (Billboard)	4
US AOR Tracks (Radio & Records)	1

=== Decade-end charts ===
Decade-end chart performance for "Come as You Are"
Chart (2010–2019)	Position
Canadian Mainstream Rock Radio (Billboard)	3
US Mainstream Rock (Nielsen Music)	3

== Certifications ==
Certifications for "Come as You Are"
Region	Certification	Certified units/sales
Australia (ARIA)	7× Platinum	490,000^{‡}
Brazil (Pro-Música Brasil)	Gold	30,000^{‡}
France (SNEP)	Gold	100,000^{‡}
Germany (BVMI)	Platinum	600,000^{‡}
Italy (FIMI) Sales since 2009	Platinum	50,000^{‡}
New Zealand (RMNZ)	6× Platinum	180,000^{‡}
Spain (Promusicae)	Platinum	60,000^{‡}
United Kingdom (BPI) Sales since 2004	3× Platinum	1,800,000^{‡}
United States (RIAA)	5× Platinum	5,000,000^{‡}
^{‡} Sales+streaming figures based on certification alone.

== Release history ==
Release dates and formats for "Come as You Are"
Region	Date	Format(s)	Label(s)	Ref.
United States	February 18, 1992	—N/a	DGC	(Note: The Recording Industry Association of America (RIAA) lists the song's release date as March 2, 1992.)
Australia	February 24, 1992	12-inch vinyl; 7-inch vinyl; CD; cassette	DGC	
United Kingdom	February 24, 1992	12-inch vinyl; 7-inch vinyl; CD (Note: Mike Cooper of The Hard Report referred to the UK CD release as a maxi CD.); cassette	DGC	
United Kingdom	March 2, 1992	12-inch vinyl (picture disc)	DGC	
