= Serving the Servant =

2019 non-fiction book by Danny Goldberg

Serving the Servant: Remembering Kurt Cobain
- First edition (US)
- Author: Danny Goldberg
- Language: English
- Genre: Memoir
- Publisher: Ecco Press (US); Orion Books (UK)
- Publication date: April 02, 2019
- Publication place: United States
- Pages: 304
- ISBN: 978-0062861504

Serving the Servant: Remembering Kurt Cobain is a book by Danny Goldberg, former music manager of Nirvana, and current president and owner of Gold Mountain Entertainment. It was published in April 2019, on the 25th anniversary of Cobain's suicide.

== Release ==
The book was announced in July 2018, and was released April 2, 2019, around the 25th anniversary of Kurt Cobain's death. It was published by Ecco Press. In May 2019, Goldberg held an "Ask Me Anything" Session to promote the book, on Reddit. The book is named after the Nirvana song "Serve the Servants" which is the first track on the band's 1993 album, In Utero.

In promotion of the book, Goldberg stated:

I think that in terms of icons, Kurt was kind of the last icon of the rock era and then the hip-hop era started.

Then, obviously, in our kid's generation, hip-hop has been a dominant voice for adolescence. It's not the only one, there were still rock artists but not only was he iconic in terms of depth in which he touched people, that music was pop. Those songs were as big as Rihanna, Travis Scott or Justin Bieber or anything today.

They were pop hits as well as touching the underground culture. That fusion of pop and underground, I don't think rock has produced someone else who could do that since Kurt. I think he's arguably the last of that era.

You could almost have bookends of an era that started with The Beatles and ended with Kurt. I mean, yeah, there was rock and roll before The Beatles but The Beatles broadened it and I think you can make that argument.

== Reception ==
The book was well-received. Rolling Stone writer Angie Martoccio stated of the book "[Goldberg] added a fascinating perspective to one of rock’s most harrowing stories, one that will certainly enhance the late icon’s legacy." Gillian Gaar, for bookandfilmglobe.com, wrote that "The pain he feels over Cobain’s death still lingers, and he writes of still wondering if there’s something he could’ve said or done that might have made a difference. But while Goldberg’s feelings of loss run deep throughout the story, Serving the Servant never hesitates to accentuate the positive".
