= In Utero =

1993 studio album by Nirvana

Studio album by Nirvana
- Released: September 13, 1993
- Recorded: January 19–21, 1993 (Note: Only "Gallons of Rubbing Alcohol Flow Through the Strip".): February 13–21, 1993; February 22–26, 1993 (mixing); May 13, 1993 (Note: "Heart-Shaped Box" backing vocals)
- Studios: Pachyderm (Cannon Falls, Minnesota); Bad Animals (Seattle, Washington)
- Genres: Grunge; noise rock; alternative rock; punk rock
- Length: 41:23
- Label: DGC
- Producer: Steve Albini

Nirvana chronology
Incesticide (1992)	In Utero (1993)	MTV Unplugged in New York (1994)

Singles from In Utero
- 1. "Heart-Shaped Box" Released: August 30, 1993; 2. "All Apologies" / "Rape Me" Released: December 6, 1993; 3. "Pennyroyal Tea" Released: April 19, 2014 (20th anniversary re-release)

In Utero is the third and final studio album by American rock band Nirvana, first released on September 13, 1993 in the UK and Europe, and internationally on 21 September by DGC Records. Displeased with the polished production of their previous album Nevermind (1991), Nirvana hired Steve Albini to give In Utero a more abrasive tone.

In Utero was recorded in February 1993 at Pachyderm Studios. Upon completion, rumors circulated that DGC may refuse to release Albini's mix of the album. It was mastered by Bob Ludwig to achieve a more radio-friendly result, while Scott Litt was hired to remix the singles "All Apologies", "Heart-Shaped Box" and "Pennyroyal Tea".

In Utero was a major critical and commercial success and is frequently cited as one of the greatest albums of all time. Critics praised the album's lyrics and raw, unconventional sound. It reached number one on the US Billboard 200 and UK Albums Chart; "Heart-Shaped Box" and "All Apologies" reached number one on the Billboard Modern Rock Tracks chart. The album is certified 6× platinum in the US for 6 million sales and has sold 15 million copies worldwide. It is the final studio album to be released before Cobain's death.

== Background ==
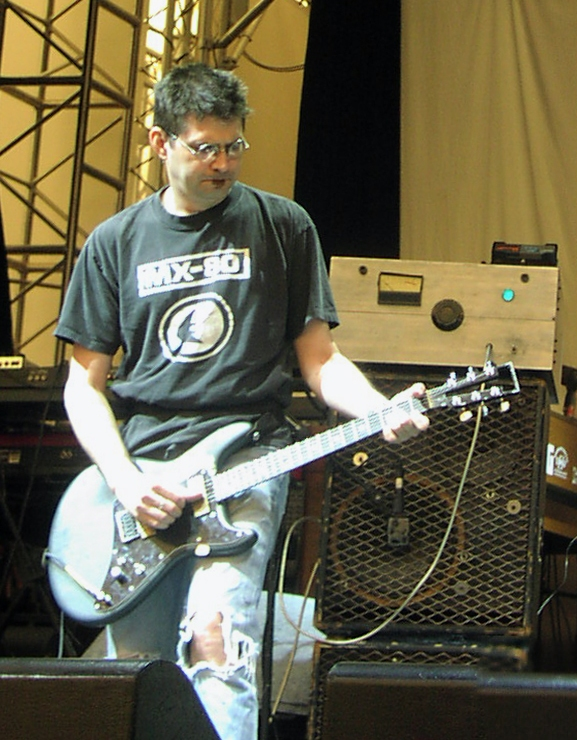
Nirvana enlisted producer and musician Steve Albini to take In Utero's sound in a new direction.

Nirvana broke into the mainstream with their second album, Nevermind, in 1991. Despite modest sales estimates, Nevermind was a major commercial success, popularizing the grunge movement and alternative rock. Nirvana expressed dissatisfaction with the sound of the album, citing its production as too polished. Early in 1992, the singer, Kurt Cobain, told Rolling Stone that the next album would showcase "both of the extremes" of their sound, saying: "It'll be more raw with some songs and more candy pop on some of the others. It won't be as one-dimensional." The producer of Nevermind, Butch Vig, said later that Cobain had needed to work with a different producer to "reclaim his punk ethics or cred".

Cobain wanted to start work in mid-1992, but his bandmates lived in different cities, and Cobain and his wife, Courtney Love, were expecting the birth of their daughter, Frances Bean. Nirvana's record label, DGC Records, had hoped to release a new Nirvana album for the 1992 holiday season; instead, they released the compilation album Incesticide.

In a Melody Maker interview published in July 1992, Cobain said he was interested in recording with Jack Endino, who had produced Nirvana's 1989 debut album Bleach, and Steve Albini, the former frontman of the noise rock band Big Black, who had produced various independent releases. In Seattle in October 1992, Nirvana recorded several demos with Endino, mainly as instrumentals, including songs later rerecorded for In Utero. Endino recalled that they did not ask him to produce their next record, and that they constantly debated working with Albini.

Nirvana recorded another set of demos while on tour in Brazil in January 1993. "Gallons of Rubbing Alcohol Flow Through the Strip" was recorded by Craig Montgomery at BMG Ariola Ltda in Rio de Janeiro, during the three-day demo session. It was originally titled "I'll Take You Down to the Pavement", a reference to an argument between Cobain and the Guns N' Roses singer Axl Rose at the 1992 MTV Video Music Awards.

Nirvana chose Albini to record their third album. Cobain said he chose Albini because he had produced two of his favorite records, Surfer Rosa by the Pixies and Pod by the Breeders. Cobain wanted to use Albini's technique of capturing the natural ambience of a room via the placement of several microphones, something previous Nirvana producers had been averse to trying.

Albini was known in the American independent music scene for his criticism of the mainstream music industry and had a strict preference for analog recording rather than digital. He sent a disclaimer to the British music press denying rumors of his involvement with Nirvana, only to receive a call from Nirvana's management a few days later. Albini dismissed Nirvana as "R.E.M. with a fuzzbox" and "an unremarkable version of the Seattle sound". However, he accepted the job because he felt sorry for them, perceiving them as "the same sort of people as all the small-fry bands I deal with," at the mercy of their record company.

Before recording began, Nirvana sent Albini a tape of the demos they had made in Brazil. In return, Albini sent Cobain a copy of the then-unreleased PJ Harvey album Rid of Me to give him an idea of the acoustics at the studio where they would record. Albini said that Cobain was impressed with the sound of Harvey's vocals on the album, "He really liked the way her singing came across. He was a fan."

== Recording ==
Nirvana and Albini set a two-week deadline for recording. At the suggestion of Albini, who was wary of interference from DGC, Nirvana paid for the sessions with their own money. Studio fees totaled $24,000, while Albini took a flat fee of $100,000. Though he stood to earn about $500,000 from royalties, Albini refused to accept them, as he considered taking royalties immoral and "an insult to the artist".

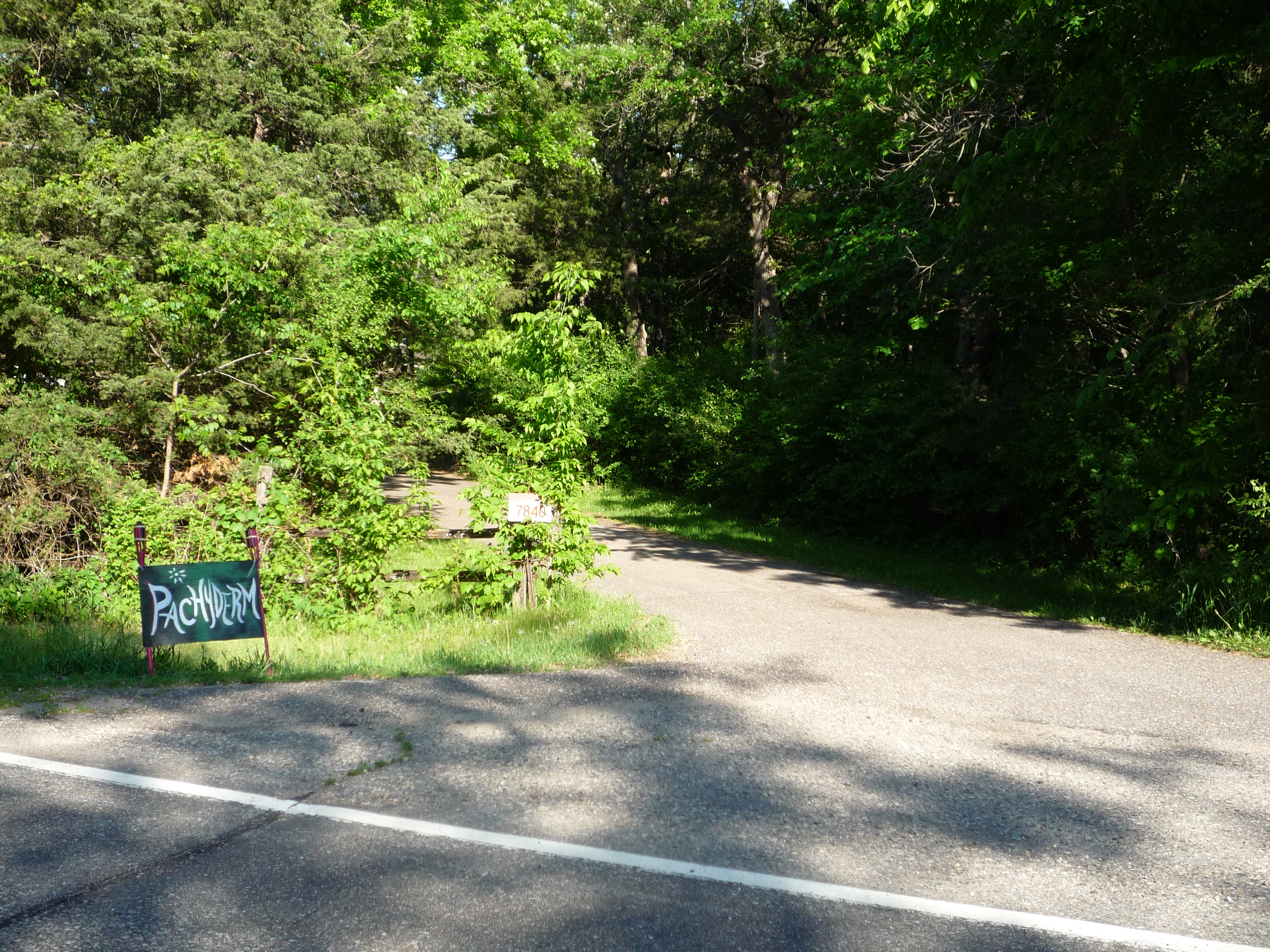
A sign welcomes visitors to the secluded location of Pachyderm Studios, where Nirvana stayed in virtual solitude while recording the album.

In February 1993, Nirvana traveled to Pachyderm Studios in Cannon Falls, Minnesota. Albini did not meet them until the first day of recording, though he had spoken to them beforehand about the type of album they wanted to make; he observed that "they wanted to make precisely the sort of record that I'm comfortable doing". The group stayed in a house on the studio grounds. Novoselic compared the isolated conditions to a gulag; he said, "There was snow outside, we couldn't go anywhere. We just worked." For most of the sessions, only the band, Albini, and the technician Bob Weston were present. Nirvana made it clear to DGC and their management company Gold Mountain that they wanted no intrusion, and did not play their work in progress for their A&R representative. Albini instituted a policy of ignoring everyone except for the band members; he said that everyone associated with Nirvana were "the biggest pieces of shit I ever met".

Nirvana arrived at Pachyderm Studios without their equipment and spent much of the first three days waiting for it to arrive by mail. Once recording began, on February 13, work moved quickly. On most days, the group began work around midday, took breaks for lunch and dinner, and worked until midnight. For most songs, Cobain, Novoselic, and Grohl recorded their basic instrumental tracks together as a band. For faster songs, such as "Very Ape" and "Tourette's", the drums were recorded separately in a kitchen for its natural reverb. Albini surrounded Grohl's drum kit with about 30 microphones. Cobain added additional guitar tracks to about half of the songs, then guitar solos, and finally vocals. The band did not discard takes and kept virtually everything they recorded.

Albini saw himself more as an engineer than a producer; despite his personal opinions, he let the band choose takes. He said, "Generally speaking, [Cobain] knows what he thinks is acceptable and what isn't acceptable [...] He can make concrete steps to improve things that he doesn't think are acceptable." Cobain reportedly recorded all his vocal tracks in six hours. Albini said that Cobain, who had struggled with drug addiction, was focused and sober in the studio.

Recording was completed in six days; Cobain had anticipated disagreements with Albini, whom he had heard "was supposedly this sexist jerk", but called the process "the easiest recording we've ever done, hands down". The only disruption occurred a week into the sessions, when Love arrived because she missed Cobain. Weston's girlfriend, the studio's chef, said that Love created tension by criticizing Cobain's work and was confrontational with everyone present.

The initial mix of In Utero took five days. This was quick by Nirvana's standards, but not for Albini, who was used to mixing albums in a day or two. When work on a mix was not producing desired results, the band and Albini took the rest of the day off to watch nature videos, set things on fire and make prank calls. The sessions were completed on February 26. "I Hate Myself and Want to Die" was omitted from the album as Cobain felt it already contained too many "noise" songs.

=== Production and mixing dispute ===
After the recording sessions ended, Nirvana sent unmastered tapes of the album to several individuals, including Gold Mountain and Ed Rosenblatt, the president of DGC's parent company, Geffen Records. When asked about the feedback he received, Cobain told Michael Azerrad, "The grown-ups don't like it." He said he was told his songwriting was "not up to par", the sound was "unlistenable", and that there was uncertainty that mainstream radio would accept Albini's production. Few at Geffen or Gold Mountain had wanted Nirvana to record with Albini, and Cobain felt he was receiving an unstated message to scrap the sessions and start again.

Cobain was upset and said to Azerrad, "I should just re-record this record and do the same thing we did last year because we sold out last year—there's no reason to try and redeem ourselves as artists at this point. I can't help myself—I'm just putting out a record I would like to listen to at home." However, a number of Nirvana's friends liked the album, and by April, Nirvana was intent on releasing In Utero as it was. According to Cobain, "Of course, they want another Nevermind, but I'd rather die than do that. This is exactly the kind of record I would buy as a fan, that I would enjoy owning."

The band began to have doubts about the record. Cobain said, "The first time I played it at home, I knew there was something wrong. The whole first week I wasn't really interested in listening to it at all, and that usually doesn't happen. I got no emotion from it, I was just numb." The group concluded that the bass and lyrics were inaudible and asked Albini to remix the album. He declined; as he recalled, "[Cobain] wanted to make a record that he could slam down on the table and say, 'Listen, I know this is good, and I know your concerns about it are meaningless, so go with it.' And I don't think he felt he had that yet ... My problem was that I feared a slippery slope." The band attempted to address their concerns during the mastering process with Bob Ludwig at his studio in Portland, Maine. Novoselic was pleased with the results, but Cobain still did not feel it was perfect.

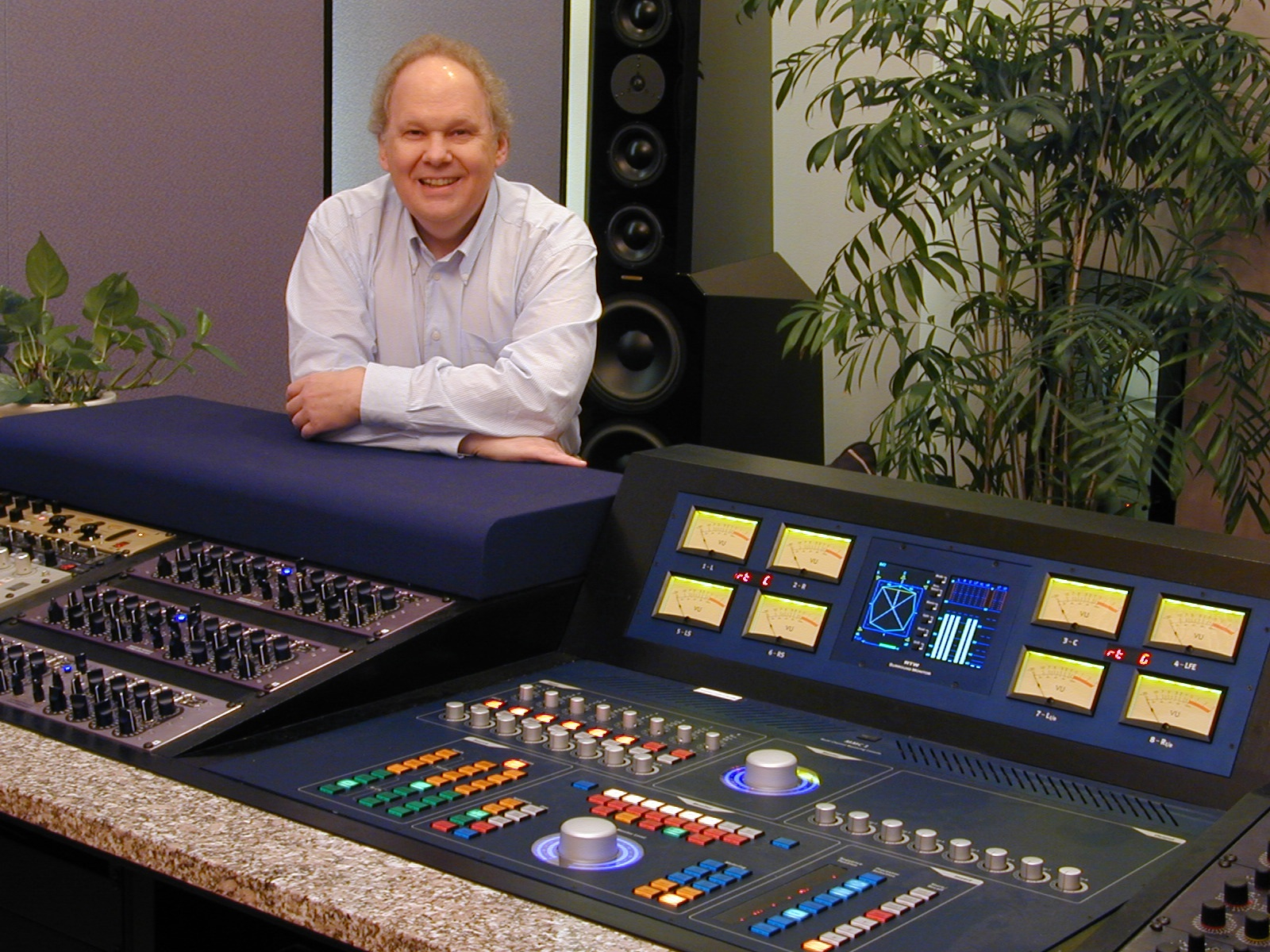
Audio mastering engineer Bob Ludwig (pictured in 2008) was recruited to help make the album sound acceptable to DGC Records.

Soon afterward, in April 1993, Albini told the Chicago Tribune that he doubted Geffen would release the album. Years later, Albini said: "I wasn't there when the band was having their discussions with the record label. All I know is ... we made a record, everybody was happy with it. A few weeks later I hear that it's unreleasable and it's all got to be redone." While Albini's remarks in the article drew no reply from Nirvana or Geffen, Newsweek ran a similar article soon afterwards that did. Nirvana wrote a letter to Newsweek denying any pressure to change the album and saying the author had "ridiculed our relationship with our label based on totally erroneous information". The band reprinted the letter in a full-page ad in Billboard. Rosenblatt insisted in a press release that Geffen would release anything Nirvana submitted, and the label founder, David Geffen, made the unusual move of calling Newsweek to complain.

Nirvana considered working with the producer Scott Litt and remixing some tracks with Andy Wallace, who had mixed Nevermind. Albini vehemently disagreed, and said the band had agreed not to modify the tracks without his involvement. He initially refused to give the master tapes to Gold Mountain, but relented after a phone call from Novoselic. The band eventually had Litt remix songs intended as singles; "Heart Shaped Box" and "All Apologies" were remixed at Seattle's Bad Animals Studio in May 1993. The rest of the album was left unaltered aside from a remastering. Albini was critical of the final mix; he said, "The record in the stores doesn't sound all that much like the record that was made, though it's still them singing and playing their songs, and the musical quality of it still comes across." According to Albini, In Utero made him unpopular with major record labels, and he faced problems finding work in the year following its release.

== Music and lyrics ==
"Milk It"
"Milk It" displays the aggressive and more experimental sound Nirvana explored on In Utero.

"Rape Me"
"Rape Me" is an anti-rape song with direct lyrics.

Albini sought to produce a record that sounded nothing like Nevermind. He felt the sound of Nevermind was "sort of a standard hack recording that has been turned into a very, very controlled, compressed radio-friendly mix [...] That is not, in my opinion, very flattering to a rock band." Instead, he intended to capture a more natural and visceral sound. Albini refused to double-track Cobain's vocals and instead recorded him singing in a resonant room. He noted the intensity of Cobain's vocals on some tracks; he said, "There's a really dry, really loud voice at the end of 'Milk It' ... that was also done at the end of 'Rape Me', where [Cobain] wanted the sound of him screaming to just overtake the whole band." Albini achieved the sparse drum sound by placing several microphones around Grohl, picking up the natural reverberation of the room. Albini said, "If you take a good drummer and put him in front of a drum kit that sounds good acoustically and just record it, you've done your job."

Azerrad asserted in his 1993 biography Come as You Are: The Story of Nirvana that In Utero showcased divergent sensibilities of abrasiveness and accessibility that reflected the upheavals Cobain experienced prior to the album's completion. He wrote, "The Beatlesque 'Dumb' happily coexists beside the all-out frenzied punk graffiti of 'Milk It,' while 'All Apologies' is worlds away from the apoplectic 'Scentless Apprentice.' It's as if [Cobain] has given up trying to meld his punk and pop instincts into one harmonious whole. Forget it. This is war." Cobain believed, however, that In Utero was not "any harsher or any more emotional" than any of Nirvana's previous records. Novoselic agreed that the album leaned more towards the band's "arty, aggressive side"; he said, "There's always been [Nirvana] songs like 'About a Girl' and there's always been songs like 'Paper Cuts'... Nevermind came out kind of 'About a Girl'-y and this [album] came out more 'Paper Cuts'". Cobain cited "Milk It" as an example of the more experimental and aggressive direction in which the band's music had been moving in the months prior to the sessions at Pachyderm Studios. Novoselic viewed the album's singles "Heart-Shaped Box" and "All Apologies" as "gateways" to the more abrasive sound of the rest of the album, telling the journalist Jim DeRogatis that once listeners played the record, they would discover "this aggressive wild sound, a true alternative record". Rolling Stone likened "Very Ape" to "Kanishka" by Los Brujos and "Milk It" to "It's Shoved" by Melvins.

Several songs on In Utero were written years prior to recording; some dated to 1990. Cobain favored long titles, such as "Frances Farmer Will Have Her Revenge on Seattle", in reaction to contemporary alternative rock bands that used single-word titles. He continued to work on the lyrics while recording. He told Darcey Steinke in Spin in 1993 that, in contrast to Bleach and Nevermind, the lyrics were "more focused, they're almost built on themes". Azerrad asserted that the lyrics were less impressionistic and more straightforward than in previous Nirvana songs. Azerrad also noted that "virtually every song contains some image of sickness and disease". In a number of songs, Cobain made reference to books; "Frances Farmer Will Have Her Revenge on Seattle" was inspired by Shadowland, a 1978 biography of actress Frances Farmer, with whom Cobain had been fascinated ever since he read the book in high school. "Scentless Apprentice" was written about Perfume: The Story of a Murderer, a historical horror novel about a perfumer's apprentice who attempts to create the ultimate perfume by killing virgin women and taking their scent.

According to the psychologist Thomas Joiner, it is clear that suicide was on Cobain's mind as he worked on the album, with its lyrics illustrating "the merging of death with themes of nurturance and life, sometimes in stark and disturbing ways." Examples include the song "Milk It", with the phrase "I am my own parasite", which according to Joiner is a "succinct and even sublime way to combine urges toward death and life." The words "Her milk is my shit, My shit is her milk" demonstrate that "Cobain clearly had a penchant for disturbing imagery in which themes of nurturance are merged with themes of disease and waste." Another example is Cobain's referral to an "umbilical noose" in the song "Heart Shaped Box".

Cobain described In Utero as "very impersonal". He also told Q that the infant and childbirth imagery on the album and his newfound fatherhood were coincidental. However, Azerrad argued that much of the album contains personal themes, noting that Grohl held a similar view. Grohl said, "A lot of what he has to say is related to a lot of the shit he's gone through. And it's not so much teen angst any more. It's a whole different ball game: rock star angst." Cobain downplayed recent events and told Azerrad that he did not want to write a track that explicitly expressed his anger at the media; Azerrad countered that "Rape Me" seemed to deal with that very issue. While Cobain said the song was written long before his addiction problems became public, he agreed that the song could be viewed in that light. "Serve the Servants" comments on Cobain's life. The opening lines "Teenage angst has paid off well / Now I'm bored and old" were a reference to Cobain's state of mind in the wake of Nirvana's success. Cobain dismissed the media attention given to the effect his parents' divorce had on his life with the line "That legendary divorce is such a bore" from the chorus, and directly addressed his father with the lines "I tried hard to have a father / But instead I had a dad / I just want you to know that I don't hate you any more / There is nothing I could say that I haven't thought before". Cobain said he wanted his father to know he did not hate him, but had no desire to talk to him.

According to the journalist Gillian G. Gaar, "Gallons of Rubbing Alcohol Flow Through the Strip" was the kind of improvisational jam Nirvana frequently performed in the studio, but had rarely recorded during earlier sessions, when the priority had been to record as quickly as possible. She wrote that it featured "Cobain alternating between seemingly disconnected singing and spoken-words sections, with Novoselic and Grohl providing a steady background accompaniment, punctuated by bursts of noisy guitar." Journalist Everett True described the song's mood as "playful", with "the instruments engaging in a game of cat and mouse, almost daring each other to explode in fury". Novoselic said it was an example of the band "just fucking around".

== Title and packaging ==
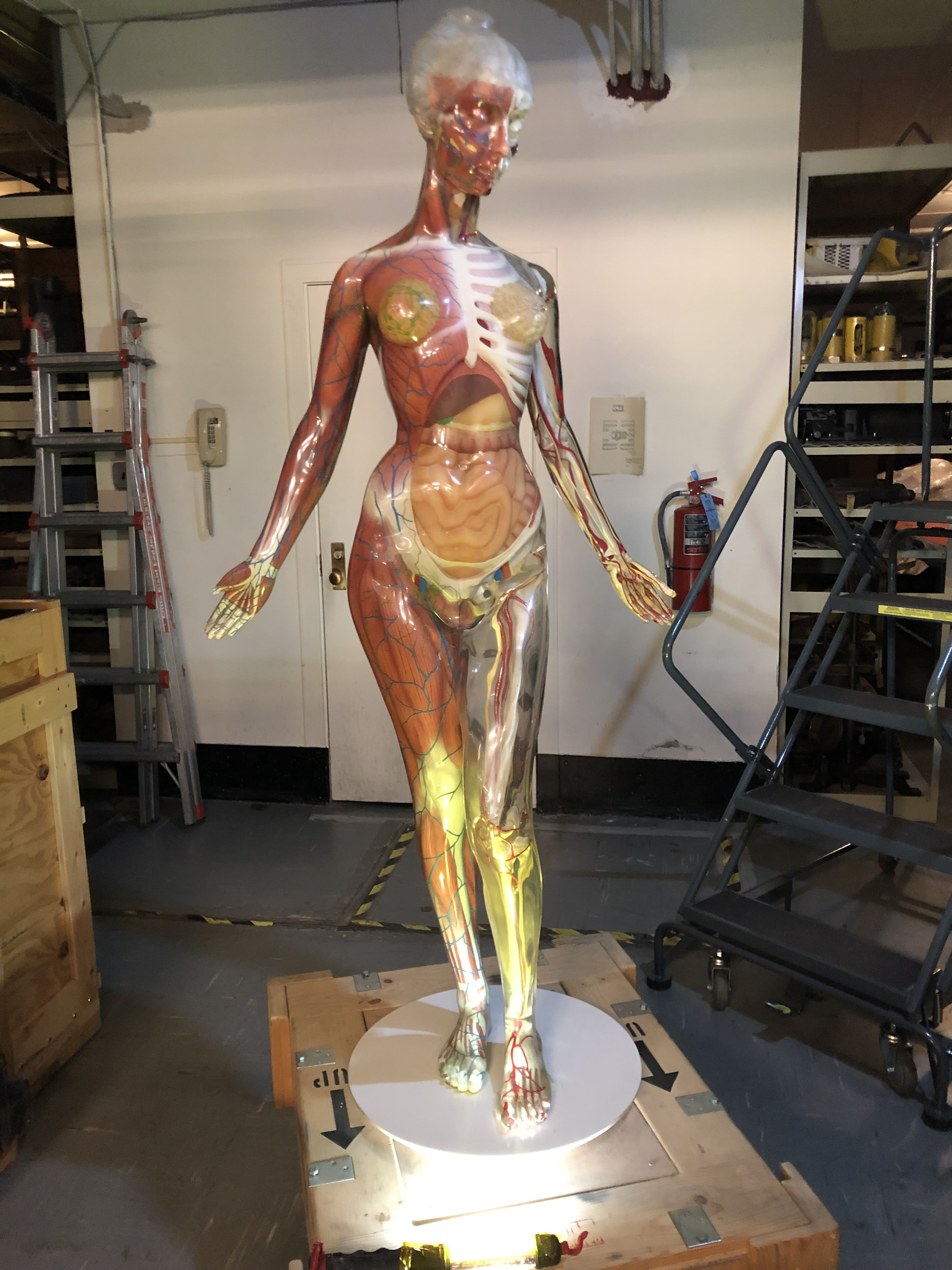
Transparent Anatomical Manikin (TAM), similar to the one featured on the album cover

Cobain originally wanted to name the album I Hate Myself and I Want to Die, a phrase that had originated in his journals in mid-1992. At the time, he used the phrase as a response whenever someone asked him how he was doing. Cobain intended the album title as a joke; he stated he was "tired of taking this band so seriously and everyone else taking it so seriously". Novoselic convinced Cobain to change the title due to fear that it could potentially result in a lawsuit. The band then considered using Verse Chorus Verse—a title taken from its song "Verse Chorus Verse", and a (at the time current) working title of "Sappy"—before eventually settling on In Utero (Latin: "in the uterus"). The final title was taken from a poem written by Courtney Love.

The art director for In Utero was Robert Fisher, who had designed all of Nirvana's releases on DGC. Most of the ideas for the artwork for the album and related singles came from Cobain. Fisher recalled that "[Cobain] would just give me some loose odds and ends and say 'Do something with it.'" The cover of the album is an image of a Transparent Anatomical Manikin, with angel wings superimposed. Cobain created the collage on the back cover which he described as "Sex and woman and In Utero and vaginas and birth and death", consisting of model fetuses, a turtle shell and models of turtles, and body parts lying in a bed of orchids and lilies. The collage had been set up on the floor of Cobain's living room and was photographed by Charles Peterson after an unexpected call from Cobain. The album's track listing and re-illustrated symbols from Barbara G. Walker's The Woman's Dictionary of Symbols and Sacred Objects were then positioned around the edge of the collage.

Mannequins of the angel-winged anatomical figure were used as stage props on Nirvana's concert tour supporting In Utero. One such mannequin later featured at the Experience Music Project museum's exhibition "Nirvana: Taking Punk to the Masses", which ran from April 2011 through 2013 and showcased memorabilia celebrating the band's music and history.

== Marketing and sales ==
To avoid over-hyping the album, DGC Records took a low-key approach to promoting In Utero; their head of marketing told Billboard before the album's release that they were planning a campaign similar to that of Nevermind, and the label would "set things up, duck, and get out of the way". The label aimed its promotion at alternative markets and press, and released the album on vinyl as part of this strategy. In contrast to Nevermind, DGC did not release any of In Utero's singles commercially in the United States. DGC sent promo copies of the album's first single, "Heart-Shaped Box", to American college, modern rock, and album-oriented rock radio stations in early September, but did not target Top 40 radio. The band was convinced that In Utero would not be as successful as Nevermind. Cobain told Jim DeRogatis, "We're certain that we won't sell a quarter as much, and we're totally comfortable with that because we like this record so much."

In Utero was released on September 13, 1993, on CD, vinyl record and cassette tape in the United Kingdom, and on September 14 on vinyl in the United States, with the American vinyl pressing limited to 25,000 copies. It was issued on CD and in other formats on September 21 in the US. European and Australian versions of In Utero released that same month included "Gallons of Rubbing Alcohol Flow Through the Strip" as a hidden bonus track, with a sticker on the cover reading "Exclusive International Bonus Track", although the booklet referred to the song as a "Devalued American Dollar Purchase Incentive Track". According to Novoselic, DGC did not want the European version to compete with the US version, and so added the extra track.

In Utero debuted at number one on the US Billboard 200, selling 180,000 copies. By late 1993, it had sold 1 million copies in the US and 1.3 million copies outside of the US. The retail chain stores Wal-Mart and Kmart refused to sell it; according to The New York Times, Wal-Mart said this was due to lack of consumer demand, while Kmart representatives said the album did not fit with their "merchandise mix". In truth, both chains feared that customers would be offended by the artwork on the back cover. DGC issued a new version to the stores in March 1994, with edited album artwork, "Rape Me" retitled "Waif Me", and the Scott Litt remix of "Pennyroyal Tea". A spokesperson for Nirvana explained that the band decided to edit the packaging because they wanted their music available to "kids who don't have the opportunity to go to mom-and-pop stores". In Utero also debuted at number one in the United Kingdom where according to NME, "Nirvana confirmed their status as the seminal band of the time".

In October 1993, Nirvana began their first American tour in two years to promote the album. A second single, a split release that featured "All Apologies" and "Rape Me", was issued in December in the United Kingdom. The band began a six-week European leg in February 1994, but it was canceled partway through after Cobain suffered a drug overdose in Rome on March 4. Cobain agreed to enter drug rehabilitation, but went missing soon afterward. On April 8, he was found dead in his Seattle home, having shot himself. The "Pennyroyal Tea" single was canceled in the wake of Cobain's death and the dissolution of Nirvana; limited promotional copies were released in Britain. Three days after Cobain's body was discovered, In Utero moved from number 72 to number 27 on the Billboard charts, with a 122% sales increase of 40,000 copies sold compared to 18,000 in the week before, and having sold a total of 1.8 million copies in the US alone.

In Utero was certified six-times platinum in the US for shipments of over six million units in 2024. It has sold 4,258,000 copies in the United States, according to Nielsen SoundScan in 2013. It has sold 15 million copies worldwide.

=== Reissues ===
For its 20th anniversary, DGC reissued In Utero in several formats in September 2013, including the Live and Loud show on DVD. In April 2014, "Pennyroyal Tea" was released as a single for Record Store Day. For the album's 30th anniversary, DGC re-issued In Utero in several formats on October 27, 2023, which included the full December 30, 1993 show at the Great Western Forum in Los Angeles and the January 7, 1994, show at the Seattle Centre Arena.

== Critical reception ==
Professional ratings
Aggregate scores
Source	Rating
Metacritic	90/100 (20th anniversary)
Review scores
Source	Rating
AllMusic	5/5 stars
Blender	5/5 stars
Chicago Sun-Times	4/4 stars
Christgau's Consumer Guide	A
Entertainment Weekly	B+
Los Angeles Times	3.5/4 stars
Music Week	5/5 stars
NME	8/10
Pitchfork	10/10
Q	4/5 stars
Rolling Stone	4.5/5 stars
Select	5/5 stars

Although not as commercially successful as Nevermind, In Utero received widespread acclaim from critics, although many found it inferior to Nevermind upon release. Time's Christopher John Farley stated in his review, "Despite the fears of some alternative-music fans, Nirvana hasn't gone mainstream, though this potent new album may once again force the mainstream to go Nirvana." Rolling Stone reviewer David Fricke said that the album is "a lot of things – brilliant, corrosive, enraged and thoughtful, most of them all at once. But more than anything, it's a triumph of the will." Entertainment Weekly reviewer David Browne commented "Kurt Cobain hates it all", and noted that the sentiment pervades the record. Browne argued, "The music is often mesmerizing, cathartic rock & roll, but it is rock & roll without release, because the band is suspicious of the old-school rock clichés such a release would evoke."

NME writer John Mulvey had doubts about the record; he concluded, "As a document of a mind in flux – dithering, dissatisfied, unable to come to terms with sanity – Kurt should be proud of [the album]. As a follow-up to one of the best records of the past ten years it just isn't quite there." Ben Thompson of The Independent commented that in spite of the more abrasive songs, "In Utero is beautiful far more often than it is ugly ... Nirvana have wisely neglected to make the unlistenable punk-rock nightmare they threatened us with." Q felt that the album showcases Cobain's songwriting abilities and wrote, "If this is how Cobain is going to develop, the future is lighthouse-bright."

Several critics ranked In Utero one of the best releases of the year; it placed first and second in the album categories of the Rolling Stone and Village Voice Pazz & Jop year-end critics' polls. The New York Times included it on its list of the top ten albums of the year. It was nominated for Best Alternative Music Album at the 1994 Grammy Awards. The guitar riff from "Very Ape" was sampled by British electronic band the Prodigy for their 1994 single "Voodoo People".

=== Reappraisal ===
In Utero has continued to perform commercially and gather critical praise. In a 2003 Guitar World article for the album's tenth anniversary, Cobain biographer Charles R. Cross argued that In Utero was "a far better record than [Nevermind] and one that only 10 years later seems to be an influential seed spreader, judging by current bands. If it is possible for an album that sold four million copies to be overlooked, or underappreciated, then In Utero is that lost pearl." That year, Pitchfork named In Utero the 13th best album of the 1990s. Rolling Stone ranked it number 435 on its list The 500 Greatest Albums of All Time, and 173 in its 2020 and 2023 updated lists. It also ranked it the seventh best album of the 90s.

In 2004, Blender named In Utero the 94th greatest American album, and in 2005, Spin named it the 51st best album of the previous 20 years. In 2005, In Utero was ranked number 358 in Rock Hard's book of The 500 Greatest Rock & Metal Albums of All Time. In 2013, NME ranked it at number 35 on its list "The 500 Greatest Albums of All Time". The album was also included in the book 1001 Albums You Must Hear Before You Die. In May 2017, Loudwire ranked it at number six on its list "The 30 Best Grunge Albums of All Time". In April 2019, Rolling Stone placed it at number eight on its 50 Greatest Grunge Albums list. In October 2023, the Official Charts Company revealed that In Utero was the fifth most streamed album from the 1990s in the United Kingdom.

== Track listing ==
All tracks are written by Kurt Cobain, except where noted.

No.	Title	Writer(s)	Length
1.	"Serve the Servants"		3:36
2.	"Scentless Apprentice"	Cobain, Dave Grohl, Krist Novoselic	3:48
3.	"Heart-Shaped Box"		4:41
4.	"Rape Me"		2:50
5.	"Frances Farmer Will Have Her Revenge on Seattle"		4:09
6.	"Dumb"		2:32
7.	"Very Ape"		1:56
8.	"Milk It"		3:55
9.	"Pennyroyal Tea"		3:37
10.	"Radio Friendly Unit Shifter"		4:51
11.	"Tourette's (Note: Stylized in lowercase as "tourette's")"		1:35
12.	"All Apologies"		3:51
Total length:			41:23

International editions
No.	Title	Writer(s)	Length
13.	"Gallons of Rubbing Alcohol Flow Through the Strip"	Cobain, Grohl, Novoselic	7:34 (Note: Original non-US CD pressings of the album include "Gallons of Rubbing Alcohol Flow Through the Strip" as a hidden track. It is listed on the back cover as track 13, but is heard after approximately 20 minutes of silence on track 12 following "All Apologies", beginning at 24:00.)

== Personnel ==
All personnel credits for In Utero are adapted the album's liner notes, except where noted.

Nirvana

- Kurt Cobain – guitar, vocals; photography, art direction, design
- Krist Novoselic – bass
- Dave Grohl – drums

Additional musicians

- Kera Schaley – cello ("All Apologies" and "Dumb")

Technical personnel

- Steve Albini – production, recording, mixing
- Bob Weston – technician
- Brent Sigmeth – studio assistant (uncredited)
- Scott Litt – mixing ("Heart-Shaped Box" and "All Apologies")
- Adam Kasper – second engineer to Scott Litt
- Bob Ludwig – audio mastering
- Craig Montgomery – production, engineering ("Gallons of Rubbing Alcohol Flow Through the Strip")
- Ian Beveridge – engineering ("Gallons of Rubbing Alcohol Flow Through the Strip")
- Dalmo Belati – engineering assistant ("Gallons of Rubbing Alcohol Flow Through the Strip")

Creative personnel

- Robert Fisher – photography, art direction, design
- Michael Lavine – photography
- Karen Mason – photography
- Wendy O'Conner – photography
- Charles Peterson – photography
- Neil Wallace – photography
- Music System – illustrations
- Alex Grey – pregnant woman illustrations
- Rodger Ferris – symbols illustrations

== Charts ==
=== Original release ===
Weekly chart performance for the original release for In Utero
Chart (1993)	Peak position
Australian Albums (ARIA)	2
Australian Alternative Albums (ARIA)	1
Austrian Albums (Ö3 Austria)	8
Belgian Albums (IFPI Belgium)	4
Brazilian Albums (Bizz)	3
Buenos Aires Albums (UPI)	6
Canada Albums (The Record)	2
Canada Top Albums/CDs (RPM)	3
Danish Albums (Hitlisten)	5
Dutch Albums (Album Top 100)	4
European Top 100 Albums (Music & Media)	2
Finnish Albums (Official Finnish Charts)	6
French Albums (SNEP)	2
German Albums (Offizielle Top 100)	14
Greek Albums (Pop & Rock)	13
Hungarian Albums (MAHASZ)	40
Icelandic Albums (DV)	2
Irish Albums (IFPI Ireland)	2
Italian Albums (Musica e dischi)	14
Japanese Albums (Oricon)	13
New Zealand Albums (RMNZ)	3
Norwegian Albums (VG-lista)	7
Portuguese Albums (AFP)	3
Spanish Albums (Spanish Albums Chart)	13
Swedish Albums (Sverigetopplistan)	1
Swiss Albums (Schweizer Hitparade)	16
UK Albums (MRIB)	1
UK Albums (Official Charts)	1
US Billboard 200	1
US Top 100 Pop Albums (Cashbox)	1
US Progressive Retail (CMJ)	1

Chart (1995)	Peak position
Belgian Albums (Ultratop Wallonia)	47

Chart (2021–2026)	Peak position
Croatian International Albums (HDU)	29
Greek Albums (Billboard)	1
Polish Albums (ZPAV)	26

=== 20th anniversary edition ===
Weekly chart performance for the 20th anniversary release of In Utero
Chart (2013–2014)	Peak position
Belgian Albums (Ultratop Wallonia)	21
Belgian Albums (Ultratop Flanders)	27
Greek Albums (Billboard) Super Deluxe Edition	8
Italian Albums (FIMI)	30
Japanese Albums (Oricon) Super Deluxe Edition	40
Portuguese Albums (AFP)	8
Scottish Albums (Official Charts)	28
US Billboard 200 Deluxe Edition	46
US Billboard 200 20th Anniversary Super Deluxe	112
US Top Catalog Albums (Billboard)	1
US Top Rock Albums (Billboard) Super Deluxe Edition	36

=== 30th anniversary edition ===
Weekly chart performance for the 30th anniversary release of In Utero
Chart (2023)	Peak position
Belgian Albums (Ultratop Wallonia)	10
Irish Albums (Official Charts)	47
Italian Vinyl Albums (FIMI)	9
Portuguese Albums (AFP)	3
Scottish Albums (Official Charts)	13
UK Rock & Metal Albums (Official Charts)	2

=== Year-end charts ===
Year-end chart performance for In Utero
Chart (1993)	Position
Australian Albums (ARIA)	53
Australian Alternative Albums (ARIA)	3
Canada Top Albums/CDs (RPM)	22
Eurochart Hot 100 Albums (Music & Media)	49
French Albums (SNEP)	16
Italian Albums (Musica e dischi)	72
New Zealand (RMNZ)	38
Swedish Albums (IFPI Sverige)	40
UK Albums (OCC)	46
US Billboard 200	74

Chart (1994)	Position
Australian Albums (ARIA)	99
Canada Top Albums/CDs (RPM)	58
Dutch Albums (MegaCharts)	93
French Albums (SNEP)	25
UK Albums (OCC)	92
US Cashbox Pop Albums	32
US Billboard 200	33

Chart (2002)	Position
Canadian Alternative Albums (Nielsen SoundScan)	163
Canadian Metal Albums (Nielsen SoundScan)	82

Chart (2018)	Position
Australian Vinyl Albums (ARIA)	49

Chart (2019)	Position
Australian Vinyl Albums (ARIA)	99

=== Decade-end charts ===
Chart (2010–2019)	Position
UK Vinyl Albums (OCC)	77

== Certifications ==
Region	Certification	Certified units/sales
Argentina (CAPIF)	Platinum	60,000^{^}
Australia (ARIA)	2× Platinum	140,000^{^}
Austria (IFPI Austria)	Gold	25,000^{*}
Belgium (BRMA)	Platinum	50,000^{*}
Brazil (Pro-Música Brasil)	Gold	100,000^{*}
Canada (Music Canada)	6× Platinum	600,000^{^}
France (SNEP)	Platinum	300,000^{*}
Germany (BVMI)	Gold	250,000^{^}
Italy (FIMI) Units sold since 2009	Platinum	50,000^{‡}
Japan (RIAJ)	Platinum	200,000^{^}
Mexico (AMPROFON)	Gold	100,000^{^}
Netherlands (NVPI)	Gold	50,000^{^}
New Zealand (RMNZ)	3× Platinum	45,000^{^}
Norway (IFPI Norway)	Gold	25,000^{*}
Poland (ZPAV)	Gold	50,000^{*}
Portugal (AFP)	Gold	3,500^{‡}
Spain (Promusicae)	Gold	50,000^{^}
Sweden (GLF)	Gold	50,000^{^}
United Kingdom (BPI)	3× Platinum	900,000^{‡}
United States (RIAA)	6× Platinum	6,000,000^{‡}
^{*} Sales figures based on certification alone.^{^} Shipments figures based on certification alone.^{‡} Sales+streaming figures based on certification alone.

== Release history ==
Release dates and formats for In Utero
Region	Initial release date	Edition(s)	Format(s)	Ref.
UK	September 13, 1993	Standard; Exclusive International Bonus Track (CD)	CD; LP; Cassette	
US	September 14, 1993	Standard	LP	
US	September 21, 1993	Standard	CD; Cassette	
Europe; Australia	September 14, 1993	Standard; Exclusive International Bonus Track (CD)	CD; LP; Cassette	
Various	September 24, 2013	20th Anniversary (re-issue); Deluxe; Super Deluxe	CD; CD/DVD; LP; Digital download; Streaming	
Various	October 27, 2023	30th Anniversary (re-issue); Deluxe; Super Deluxe	CD; LP; Digital download; Streaming	
