= Meat Puppets discography =

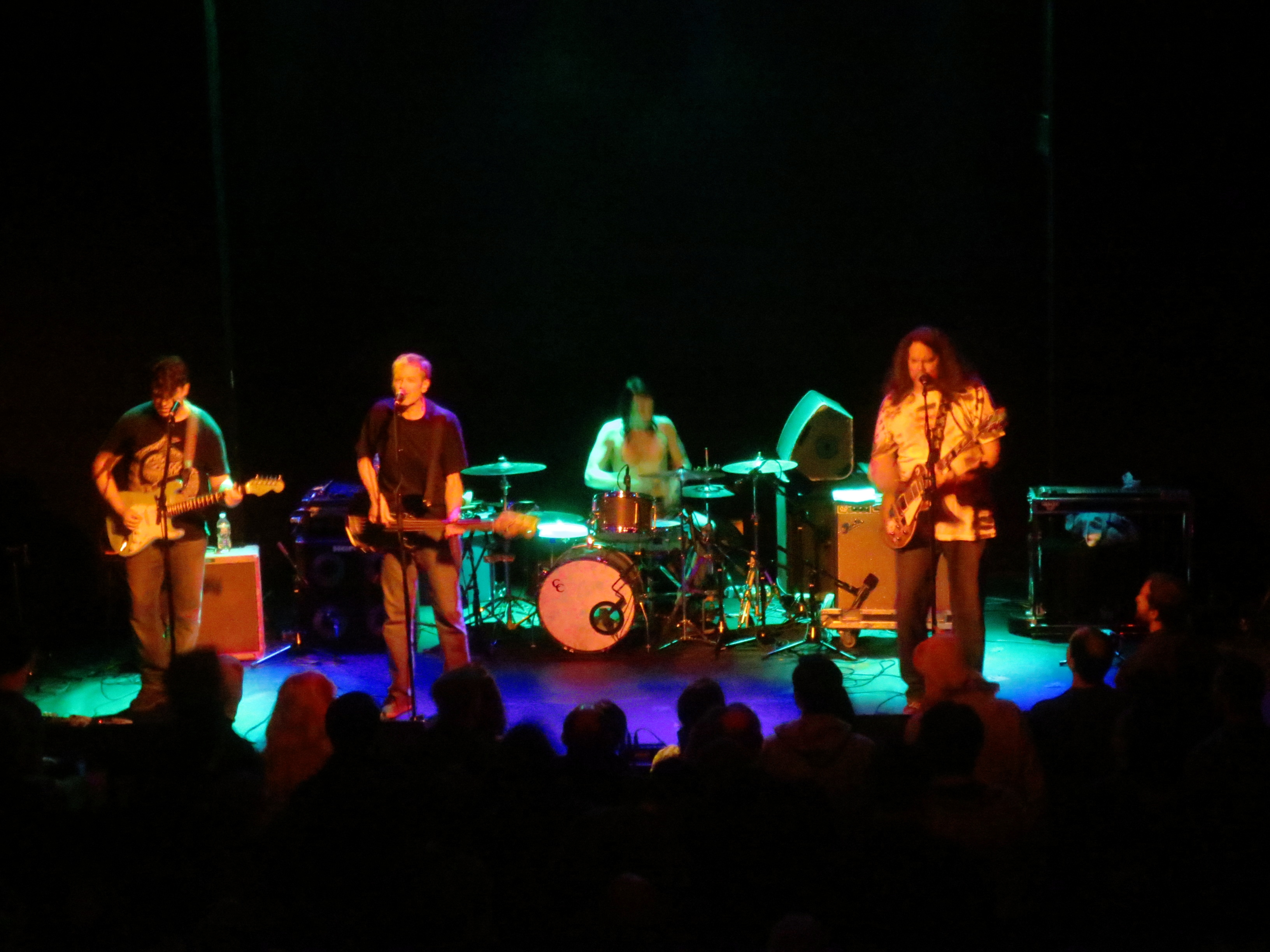
- Meat Puppets performing in 2014
- Studio albums: 15
- Extended plays: 4
- Live albums: 2
- Compilation albums: 3
- Singles: 16

The Meat Puppets are an American rock band formed in January 1980 in Tempe, Arizona.

== Albums ==
=== Studio albums ===
Title	Album details
Meat Puppets	Released: 1982; Label: SST (SST 009)
Meat Puppets II	Released: 1984; Label: SST (SST 019)
Up on the Sun	Released: 1985; Label: SST (SST 039)
Mirage	Released: 1987; Label: SST (SST 100)
Huevos	Released: 1987; Label: SST (SST 150)
Monsters	Released: 1989; Label: SST (SST 253)
Forbidden Places	Released: July 9, 1991; Label: London (828 254)
Too High to Die	Released: January 25, 1994; Label: London (828 424)
No Joke!	Released: October 5, 1995; Label: London (828 665)
Golden Lies	Released: September 26, 2000; Label: Atlantic (83402-2)
Rise to Your Knees	Released: July 17, 2007; Label: Anodyne
Sewn Together	Released: May 12, 2009; Label: Megaforce
Lollipop	Released: July 17, 2011; Label: Megaforce
Rat Farm	Released: April 16, 2013; Label: Megaforce
Dusty Notes	Released: March 8, 2019; Label: Megaforce

=== Live albums ===
Title	Album details
Live in Montana	Released: 1999; Label: Rykodisc
Meat Puppets Live	Released: 2002; Label: DCN Digital Club Network (DCN CD 1003)
Mountains Made of Sand (Live 1986)	Released: 2020; Label: Shockwaves
Live Manchester 2019	Released: 2022; Label: DC-Jam Records (DCJ21002)
Camp Songs	Released: 2023; Label: Meat Puppets Music (MPM010LP)

=== Compilation albums ===
Title	Album details
No Strings Attached	Released: 1990; Label: SST (SST 265)
Meat Puppets 8	Released: 1999; Label: Rykodisc (RBX 00005)
Classic Puppets	Released: 2004; Label: Rykodisc (RCD 10648)

== EPs ==
Title	EP details
In a Car	Released: 1981; Label: SST (SST 044)
Out My Way	Released: 1986; Label: SST (SST 049)
Raw Meat	Released: 1994; Label: London
You Love Me	Released: 1999; Label: London (PRO 74691-2)
"Multiply" EP	Released: 2020; Label: Megaforce Records (MEGA 3064)

== Singles ==
Year	Title	Peak chart positions				Album
Year	Title	US	US Main.	US Alt	UK Vinyl	Album
1985	"Swimming Ground"	—	—	—	x	Up on the Sun
1987	"Get on Down"	—	—	—	x	Mirage
1987	"I Am a Machine"	—	—	—	x	Mirage
1987	"I Can't Be Counted On"	—	—	—	x	Huevos
1989	"Light"	—	—	—	x	Monsters
1991	"Sam"	—	—	13	x	Forbidden Places
1991	"Whirlpool"	—	—	—	x	Forbidden Places
1994	"Backwater"	47	2	11	x	Too High to Die
1994	"We Don’t Exist"	—	28	—	x	Too High to Die
1994	"Roof with a Hole"	—	—	—	x	Too High to Die
1994	"Lake of Fire"	—	—	—	x	Too High to Die
1995	"Scum"	—	20	23	x	No Joke!
1996	"Taste of the Sun"	—	—	—	x	No Joke!
2000	"Armed and Stupid"	—	—	—	x	Golden Lies
2009	"Rotten Shame"	—	—	—	x	Sewn Together
2011	"Damn Thing"	—	—	—	—	Lollipop
2014	"(Hey Baby) Que Paso"/"Cathy's Clown"	—	—	—	—	Split single with Cass McCombs
2018	"Warranty"	—	—	—	—	Dusty Notes
2019	"Nine Pins"	—	—	—	—	Dusty Notes
2019	"Sea of Heartbreak"	—	—	—	—	Dusty Notes
2021	"One of These Days"	—	—	—	34	Split single with Mudhoney
"—" denotes releases that did not chart.

== Soundtrack and compilation appearances ==
- 1981 – Light Bulb ("Meat Puppets")
- 1981 – Keats Rides a Harley ("H-Elenore" and "The Losing End")
- 1981 – Amuck ("Unpleasant")
- 1983 – The Blasting Concept ("Tumblin' Tumbleweeds" and "Meat Puppets")
- 1983 – Bethel ("Soup")
- 1984 – Basic Sampler ("Aroura Borealis" and "Problem Child")
- 1983 – Leather Chaps and Lace Petticoats ("Magic Toy Missing")
- 1986 – Lovedolls Superstar ("No Values")
- 1986 – The 7 Inch Wonders of the World (In a Car EP)
- 1986 – The Blasting Concept Vol. 2 ("I Just Want to Make Love to You")
- 1990 – Duck and Cover ("Good Golly Miss Molly")
- 1990 – The Edge of Rock ("Light")
- 1991 – Stereophonic ("That’s How It Goes")
- 1991 – Aural Fixations ("Funnel of Love")
- 1994 – Chasers ("Sam")
- 1994 – Fast Track to Nowhere ("House of Blue Light")
- 1994 – Cream of Cuts ("Backwater")
- 1994 – Love and a .45 ("Animal")
- 1995 – White Man's Burden ("Animal")
- 1995 – Alterno-Daze 90's Natural Selection ("Sam")
- 1995 – X Factor ("This Day")
- 1995 – Songs in the Key of X ("Unexplained")
- 1995 – Our Band Could Be Your Life: A Tribute to D Boon and the Minutemen ("The Price of Paradise")
- 1995 – UMPF ("Backwater")
- 1996 – A Small Circle of Friends ("Not All Right")
- 1996 – Barb Wire ("Scum" (Vapourspace remix))
- 1996 – Big Ones of Alternative Rock vol. 1 ("Backwater")
- 1997 – Alternative Rock Cafe ("Backwater")
- 1999 – Alt.Country Exposed Roots ("Lost")
- 1999 – Southern Edge Vol. 1 ("Sam")
- 2000 – Crime + Punishment in Suburbia ("Two Rivers")
- 2004 – Left of the Dial: Dispatches from the '80s Underground ("Lake of Fire")
- 2011 – Newermind: A Tribute to Nirvana ("Smells Like Teen Spirit")

== Music videos ==
Year	Title	Director	Album
1984	"New Gods"		Meat Puppets II
1987	"Get On Down"	Robert Tucker	Mirage
1989	"Light"	Bill Taylor	Monsters
1991	"Sam"		Forbidden Places
1994	"Backwater"		Too High to Die
1994	"We Don't Exist"		Too High to Die
1995	"Scum"	David Markey	No Joke!
2009	"Rotten Shame"	David Markey	Sewn Together
2011	"Orange"	Michael Etoll	Lollipop
2011	"Damn Thing"	Michael Etoll	Lollipop
2019	"Warranty"		Dusty Notes
2019	"Nine Pins"	Steve Moramarco	Dusty Notes

=== Video albums ===
- Alive in the Nineties (2003)
- A History Lesson Part 1 (2010)
