= Love Me =

Love Me may refer to:

== Albums ==
- Love Me (J Peezy album), 2008
- Love Me (Jeanne Pruett album), 1972
- Love Me (Lee Jung Hyun album), 2008
- Love Me, a 1984 Jackie Chan album, or the title track

== Songs ==
- "Love Me" (Leiber/Stoller song), 1954, also performed by Elvis Presley, 1956
- "Love Me" (Buddy Holly song), 1956
- "Love Me" (112 song), featuring Mase, 1998
- "Love Me" (The 1975 song), 2015
- "Love Me" (Bee Gees song), 1976, also performed by Yvonne Elliman, 1976
- "Love Me" (JMSN song), 2023
- "Love Me" (Justin Bieber song), 2009
- "Love Me" (Lena Meyer-Landrut song), 2010
- "Love Me" (Lil Tecca song), 2018
- "Love Me" (Lil Wayne song), featuring Drake and Future, 2013
- "Love Me" (Stooshe song), featuring Travie McCoy, 2012
- "Love Me" (Tracie Spencer song), 1992
- "Love Me", by Bow Wow Wow from When the Going Gets Tough, the Tough Get Going, 1983
- "Love Me", by Diana Ross from Last Time I Saw Him, 1973
- "Love Me", by Eminem, featuring Obie Trice and 50 Cent, from 8 Mile: Music from and Inspired by the Motion Picture, 2002
- "Love Me", by Fats Domino, 1954
- "Love Me", by Jerry Lott as the Phantom, 1960
- "Love Me", by Jess Glynne from I Cry When I Laugh, 2015
- "Love Me", by Jess Glynne from Jess, 2024
- "Love Me", by Joss Stone from Water for Your Soul, 2015
- "Love Me", by Katy Perry from Prism, 2013
- "Love Me", by Lee Patrick from the film Footsteps in the Dark, 1941
- "Love Me", by W24, from Singing Dancing, 2018
- "Love, Me", by Collin Raye, 1991
- "LUV ME", by Vyzer featuring 6arelyhuman, 2024

== Film ==
- Love Me (1918 film), American film starring Dorothy Dalton
- Love Me (1942 film), German film directed by Harald Braun
- Love Me (1991 film), Canadian film directed by Marcel Simard
- Love Me (2000 film), French film directed by Laetitia Masson
- Love Me (2013 film), American-Canadian film featuring Jean-Luc Bilodeau
- Love Me (2024 American film), starring Kristen Stewart and Steven Yeun
- Love Me (2024 Indian film), directed by Arun Bhimavarapu
- Love Me!, 1986 Swedish film

== Television ==
- Love Me (TV series), 2021 Australian TV series

== Other uses ==
- Love Me, 2003 novel by Garrison Keillor
- Love Me, 2016 concert installation by Nico Sauer

== See also ==
- You Love Me (disambiguation)
