= Hardiker =

Hardiker is a surname. Notable people with the surname include:

- John Hardiker (born 1982), English footballer
- Rasmus Hardiker (born 1985), English actor

== See also ==
- Hardaker
