= List of events in Kraków =

The historic city of Kraków, Poland, especially the Old Town, is the hub of many outdoor and indoor festivals, cultural events and street parades. Many of them are seasonal and take place only one time, while others are organised annually for many years by various festival societies. All of them draw interest from the locals and visitors alike. Some of the events are organised by the city, some by private companies, but most express Polish and Kraków living traditions kept and celebrated by its citizens.

Below is the list of popular cultural events arranged by month.

== January ==
=== Welcoming of the New Year ===
The New Year's party is organised on the Main Market Square of Kraków. During this open-air show the locals and the tourists have the opportunity to welcome the New Year and take part in concerts (performed also by international artists) that are organised by the city.

=== New Year's concert ===
Each year the Kraków Philharmonic Orchestra organises a concert that takes place exactly on 1 January.

=== Carol Songs concerts in churches ===
In Poland there is a very strong tradition of singing Carol songs during Christmas and after. It is a custom that in January many churches organise Carol songs concerts during which one can listen to traditional versions of the songs and traditional music of Polish folk groups.

== February ==
=== International Sea Songs Festival ("Shanties") ===
Sailing songs (so called: Shanties) are popular, and not only among sailors or people living in coastal areas. For many years a Shanties Festival has been held in Kraków, where Polish and international performers present songs of this type.

== March / April ==
=== Easter Celebrations in Krakow ===
Easter Holidays is the period full of customs celebrated by the locals (some of them are spread around Poland while others are typical only for Kraków). Among them one may take part in Rekawka, Emaus, food blessing or Smigus Dyngus. Easter is movable feast that falls somewhere between March and late April.

=== Misteria Paschalia Festival ===
The festival presents historical music and takes place parallel to Easter Holidays. The concerts are held at the Kraków Philharmonic as well as in historic churches around the city.

== May ==
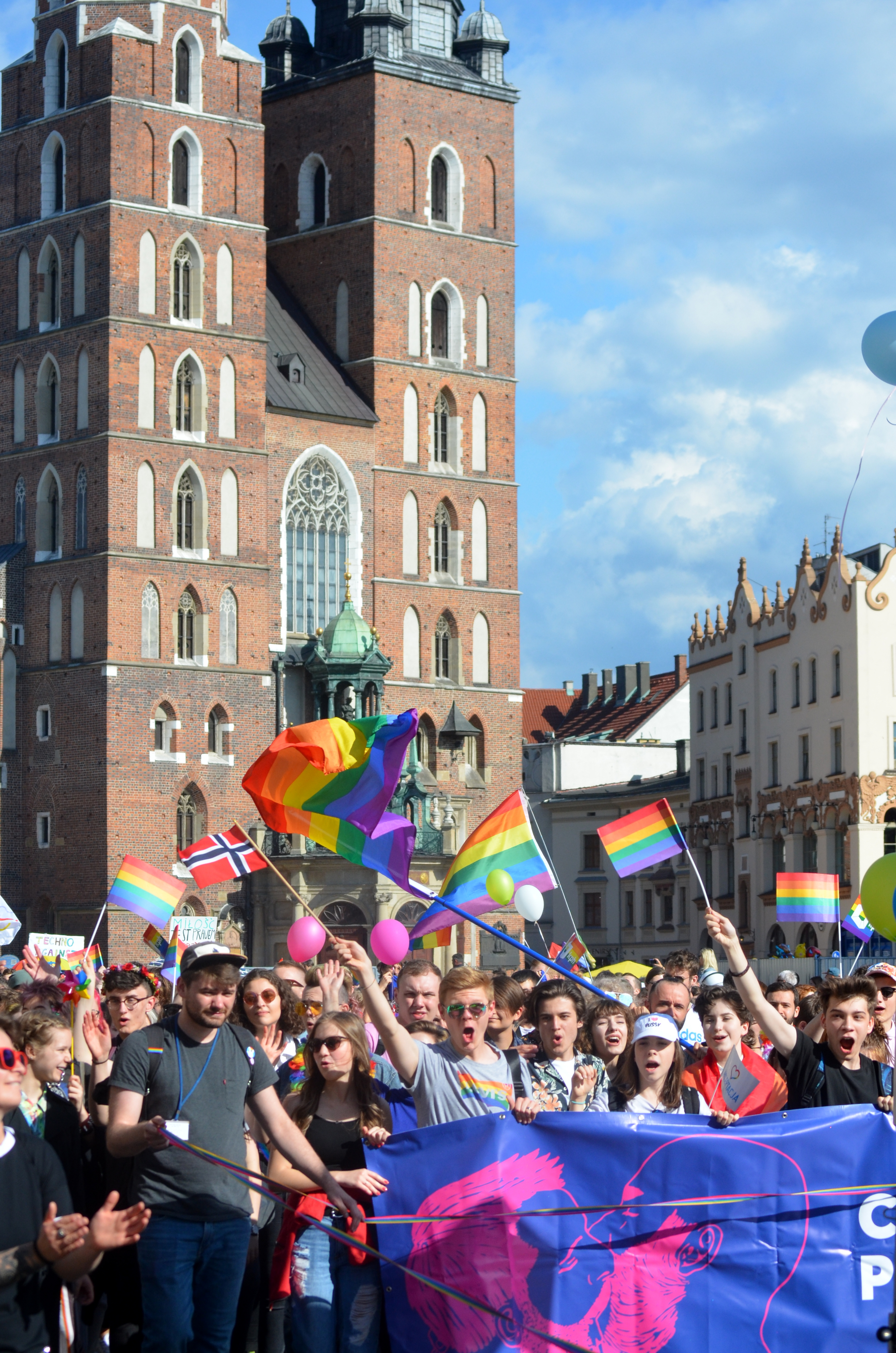
Equality March, 2018

=== The Night of Museums ===
This event gives you the opportunity to visit all the museums in Kraków (for a symbolic fee of 1 zloty). All of them prepare special concerts, show interactive exhibitions - to attract visitors and gain their interest. The museums are open till late in the night.

=== International Soup Festival ===
The festival is organised in Kazimierz district (on Nowy Square). It is a musical event joined with the contest of the best soup (between the local restaurant-keepers) that may be tried out by the visitors.

=== Juwenalia ===
The feast of Kraków students. During the three days of the event, the students rule Kraków. Numerous concerts are organized and the students (who traditionally get dressed) are welcome by the President of the city who gives them the keys to Kraków.

=== The great Dragon Parade ===
A parade is a spectacular event during which huge dragons (created by Kraków youth) are carried to the banks of Vistula river — all accompanied by brass bands, stilt walkers and dancers.

=== Equality March ===
Equality March in Kraków is an annual demonstration in the form of a street march of people opposed to homophobia and discrimination against sexual minorities in Poland, part of the May Queer Festival.

== June ==
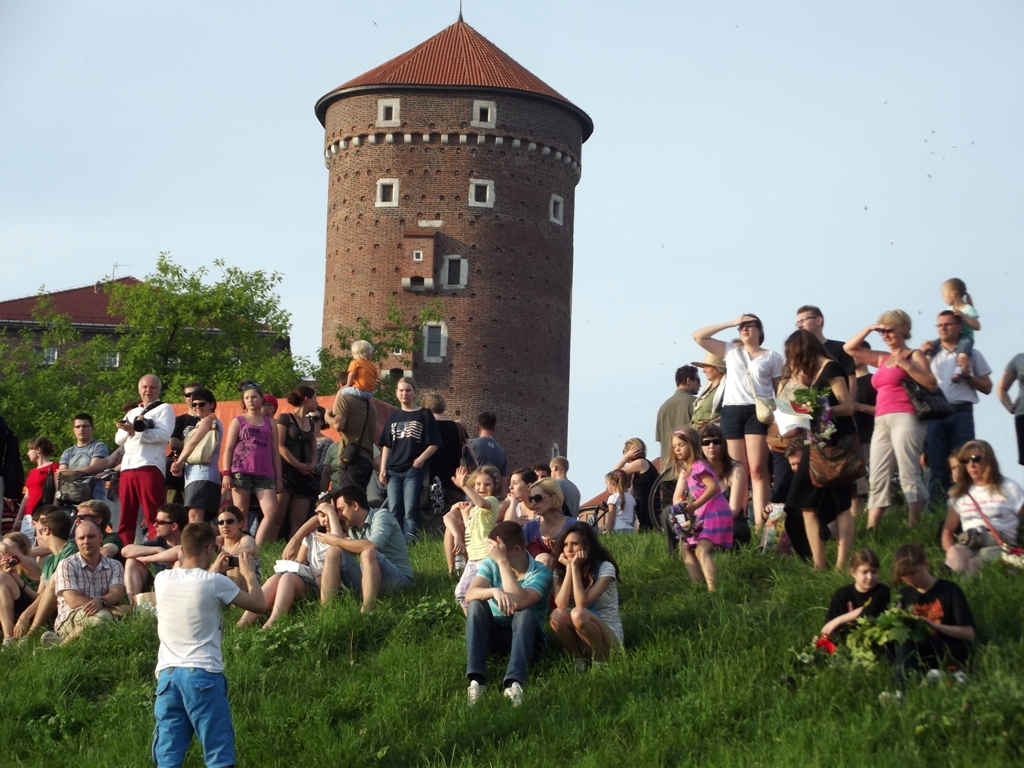
Wianki 2013

=== Corpus Christi ===
Corpus Christi is a movable feast that falls in May or June. Churches of Kraków organises colourful processions for the locals (during which some of the citizens take part in the event dressed in folk costumes). About week after the Corpus Christi, the parade of Lajkonik (a man traditionally dressed as a Tatar) takes place.

=== Floating of the Wreaths (Wianki) ===
Midsummer festival is organised by Vistula river (at the foot of the Wawel castle). There are concerts held, artistic shows - and the whole event is culminated with huge fireworks.

=== The bread festival ===
The event takes place in the Kazimierz district. The bakers present traditional methods of baking bread, while the whole event is accompanied by folk dances and singing. The visitors may purchase regional fare.

=== Jewish Culture Festival ===
The festival became internationally renowned happening. During a week of festival the visitors can take part in workshops, exhibitions and numerous concerts - all connected with Jewish Culture. The festival culminates with an open-air concert "Shalom on Szeroka street".

== July ==
=== Summer Jazz Festival ===
The festival features jazz concerts that are held in various places of Kraków (many in legendary "Under the Rams cellar"). Polish and international performers are invited.

=== Traditional Music Festival "Crossroads" ===
The festival presents the variety as well as common elements of traditional music from numerous countries, but especially those situated along the Carpathian mountains.

== August ==
=== Pierogi (Dumplings) Festival ===
The festival highlights pierogi (dumplings) , a traditional dish in Polish cuisine.

=== Music in Old Cracow Festival ===
The monthly event during which the soloists, orchestras and eminent musicians take part. The concerts are held in historical places of Kraków - such as churches, Wawel castle and the Kraków Philharmonic.

== September ==
=== Sacrum Profanum Festival ===
The main idea of the event is to present instrumental and vocal-instrumental music masterpieces in geographical order.

=== International Cycling Film Festival ===
The International Cycling Film Festival is an independent film festival that screens films related to bicycle culture. The best film is awarded with the Trzy złote szprychy (English: Three Golden Spokes), the audience award of the film festival.

== October ==
=== International Festival of Old Music ===
This event presents old music, played on old, traditional instruments in historic parts of Poland.

== November ==
=== All Saints' Day ===
During 1 November (as well as the 2nd) the Poles pay visits to the cemeteries to embellish the graves with flowers and light the candle. During those days the cemeteries become a spectacular site with thousands of candles. Especially it is worth visiting the cemeteries that boast unique architecture (such as Rakowicki cemetery).

=== International Film Festival Etiuda&Anima ===
Etiuda&Anima International Film Festival, organized in Kraków since 1994, is the oldest international film event in Poland confronting the achievements of art and film school students from all over the globe with the works of the authors of artistic animation including professional, student and independent filmmakers. It always take place in November.

=== Jazz at All Saints' Day ===
It is the oldest Jazz festival in Europe during which one can listen to Polish and international jazz musicians. Concerts and workshops are organised within this event.

=== Christmas Market ===
The opening of the Christmas Market falls in November. The visitors can purchase hand-made local products, exceptional gifts, as well as to try out specialties of Polish cuisine.

== December ==
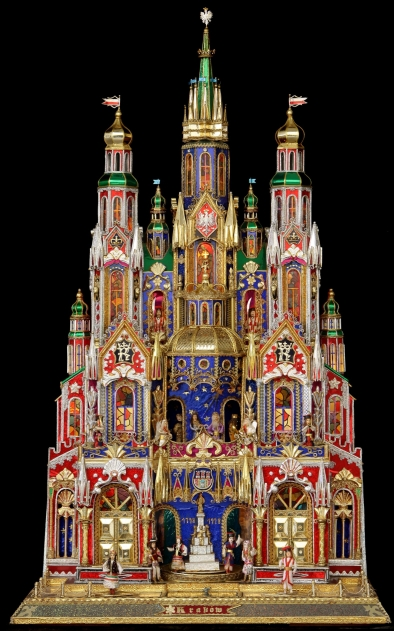
Kraków szopka by Bronisław Pięcik at the Krzysztofory Museum, Kraków Main Square

=== Nativity Scenes Contest ===
Building colourful Nativity Scenes is an old Kraków tradition. The Christmas Cribs (called: Kraków szopka ) are exceptional as they remind Kraków in their architecture (especially St Mary's church). The contest takes place on the Main Market Square - by Adam Mickiewicz monument. After the contest the most interesting pieces (together with the ones presented in previous editions) are displayed in Historical Museum of Kraków.

=== Jazz Juniors ===
The international contest of young Jazz groups gives the opportunity for the well-known groups as well as inexperienced musicians to meet together and present their skills in front of the Kraków audience.

=== New Year's Eve ===
The locals and the visitors, who decide to celebrate the New Year's Eve on the Main Market Square of Kraków, are entertained by concerts and additional happenings organised by the city.

== See also ==
- Culture of Kraków
