= Raw Meat =

Raw meat is meat that has not been cooked.

Raw Meat may refer to:

- Death Line, distributed in the US as Raw Meat, a horror film
- Raw Meat (EP), an album by American rock band Meat Puppets
