= Commemorative coins of Poland: 2001 =

Commemorative coins offered by Poland in the year 2001

Poland has a rich selection of gold and silver commemorative coins. In the year 2001, coins were launched in the series: "Monuments of Material Culture in Poland", "Polish kings and princes", "The Animals of the World", "Polish Travelers and Explorers", "The Polish Calendar of Traditional Customs and Rituals" and various occasional coins.

== Table of contents ==
Year 2001
Coin designer: Roussanka Nowakowska		Mint: Mennica Polska S.A.	
Value: zł 200	Alloy: external ring: Au900Cu100 internal ring: Au900Ag60Cu40 core: Au900Pd100	Quantity: 4,000 pcs	Quality: Proof
Issued: 24 January 2001	Diameter: 27.00 mm (1.06 in)	Weight: 15.20 g (0.54 oz; 0.49 ozt)	Market value: 2.000 zł
Obverse: In the central part an image of the Eagle as the State Emblem of the Republic of Poland. Around the Eagle a stylised whirl. Above the Eagle the year of mintage: 2001. Around the inscription: RZECZPOSPOLITA POLSKA and 200 ZŁ. Under the left talon of the Eagle the Mint mark: m/w. Reverse: A stylised image of a woman and a man entering a tunnel, symbolising the future. On the left side a semicircular inscription: ROK 2001 (Year 2001).
Amber Route
Coin designer: Ewa Tyc-Karpińska		Mint: Mennica Polska S.A.	
Value: zł 20	Alloy: 925/1000 Ag oxidised and amber	Quantity: 30,000 pcs	Quality: Standard
Issued: 21 February 2001	Diameter: 38.61 mm (1.52 in)	Weight: 28.28 g (1.00 oz; 0.91 ozt)	Market value: 2.400 zł
Obverse: On the left side an image of the Eagle as the State Emblem of the Republic of Poland. On the left side an inscription: 20 ZŁ. Below: two silver Roman cups. Around an inscription: RZECZPOSPOLITA POLSKA 2001. Under the left talon of the Eagle the Mint mark: m/w. Reverse: A stylised map of Europe with the Amber Route marked by stars. Above a piece of amber, below a denarius with an image of Nero. On the left side a semicircular inscription: SZLAK BURSZTYNOWY (Amber Route).
Monuments of Material Culture in Poland: Salt-Mine in Wieliczka
Coin designer: Robert Kotowicz		Mint: Mennica Polska S.A.	
Value: zł 20	Alloy: 925/1000 Ag and zirconium	Quantity: 25,000 pcs	Quality: Proof
Issued: 21 March 2001	Diameter: 38.61 mm (1.52 in)	Weight: 28.28 g (1.00 oz; 0.91 ozt)	Market value: 750 zł
Obverse: Image of the Eagle as the State Emblem of the Republic of Poland, on the background of a stylised fragment of rock with salt veins. Below the Eagle, on the left side, the notation specifying the year of mintage: 2001, on the right side inscription: 20 / ZŁ. Above a semicircular inscription: RZECZPOSPOLITA, below, on the background of stylised rock, an inscription: POLSKA. Under the left talon of the Eagle the Mint mark: m/w. Reverse: A scene presenting work in a salt mine in the past centuries: in central part an image of four miners rolling a block of salt, in the background: miners at work. Above an inscription: KOPALNIA SOLI (Salt Mine), below zirconium imitating a crystal of salt and an inscription: W WIELICZCE (in Wieliczka).
Polish Kings and Princes: Władysław I Łokietek (1320–1333)
Obverse designer: Ewa Tyc-Karpińska, Reverse designer: Stanisława Wątróbska-Frindt		Mint: Mennica Polska S.A.	
Value: zł 100	Alloy: Au 900/1000 (Gold)	Quantity: 2,000 pcs	Quality: Proof
Issued: 18 April 2001	Diameter: 21.00 mm (0.83 in)	Weight: 8.00 g (0.28 oz; 0.26 ozt)	Market value: 3.500 zł
Obverse: An image of the Eagle as the State Emblem of the Republic of Poland, on its sides the notation specifying the year of mintage: 2001, under the Eagle description: ZŁ 100 ZŁ, in the rim an inscription: RZECZPOSPOLITA POLSKA. Under the left talon of the Eagle the Mint mark: m/w. Reverse: A bust of the King Władysław I Łokietek. Above a semicircular inscription: WŁADYSŁAW I ŁOKIETEK – 1320–1333.
Fifteenth anniversary of the Constitutional Tribunal Decisions (1986–2001)
Coin designer: Andrzej Nowakowski		Mint: Mennica Polska S.A.	
Value: zł 10	Alloy: Ag 925/1000 (Silver)	Quantity: 25,000 pcs	Quality: Proof
Issued: 18 April 2001	Diameter: 32.00 mm (1.26 in)	Weight: 14.14 g (0.50 oz; 0.45 ozt)	Market value: 200zł
Obverse: An image of the Eagle as the State Emblem of the Republic of Poland, with a fragment of the judge's insignia (a chain) with letters RP. On the left side an inscription: 10 ZŁ, on the right side the notation specifying the year of mintage: 2001. Around a semicircular inscription: RZECZPOSPOLITA POLSKA and: ZŁOTYCH. Under the left talon of the Eagle the Mint mark: MW. Reverse: In the central part a stylised image of the Eagle's crowned head. Stylised images of scales and sheets of paper on the background of the Eagle. Around an inscription: TRYBUNAŁ KONSTYTUCYJNY 15-LECIE ORZECZNICTWA (Fifteenth anniversary of the Constitutional Tribunal Decisions). On the side an inscription: TRYBUNAŁ KONSTYTUCYJNY W SŁUŻBIE PAŃSTWA PRAWA (the Constitutional Tribunal in service to the State of law), separated by a star.
The Animals of the World: Old World Swallowtail
Obverse designer: Ewa Tyc-Karpińska, Reverse designer: Andrzej Nowakowski		Mint: Mennica Polska S.A.	
Value: zł 20	Alloy: 925/1000 Ag	Quantity: 26,500 pcs	Quality: Proof
Issued: 9 May 2001	Diameter: 38.61 mm (1.52 in)	Weight: 28.28 g (1.00 oz; 0.91 ozt)	Market value: 700 zł
Obverse: An image of the Eagle as the State Emblem of the Republic of Poland. Below the Eagle, a notation of the year of mintage: 2001, below an inscription: ZŁ 20 ZŁ. On the sides of the Eagle's talons are images of the national flag of Poland. Above a semicircular inscription: RZECZPOSPOLITA POLSKA. Under the left talon of the Eagle the Mint mark: m/w. Reverse: In the central part an image of an Old World Swallowtail. In the background a fragment of a forest. Below a fragment of a meadow and a semicircular inscription: PAŹ KRÓLOWEJ – Papilio machaon (SWALLOWTAIL).
100th centenary of Priest Cardinal Stefan Wyszyński's birth (gold)
Coin designer: Ewa Olszewska-Borys		Mint: Mennica Polska S.A.	
Value: zł 200	Alloy: Au 900/1000 (Gold)	Quantity: 4,500 pcs	Quality: Proof
Issued: 6 June 2001	Diameter: 27.00 mm (1.06 in)	Weight: 15.50 g (0.55 oz; 0.50 ozt)	Market value: 2.000 zł
Obverse: On the right side an image of the Eagle as the State Emblem of the Republic of Poland. On the left side coat of arms of Priest Cardinal Stefan Wyszyński. Below an inscription: 200 / ZŁOTYCH and a semicircular inscription: RZECZPOSPOLITA POLSKA 2001 ROK. In the background a stylised fragment of Gothic architecture. Under the left talon of the Eagle the Mint mark: m/w. Reverse: An image of the Priest Cardinal Stefan Wyszyński on the background of a stylised fragment of Gothic architecture. On the left side dates: 1901 / 1981. Around an inscription: 100-LECIE URODZIN KS. KARD. STEFANA WYSZYŃSKIEGO (centenary of the Priest Cardinal Stefan Wyszyński's birth). On the side an inscription: 100. ROCZNICA URODZIN (100th anniversary of the birth) repeated three times, separated by stars.
100th centenary of Priest Cardinal Stefan Wyszyński's birth (silver)
Coin designer: Ewa Olszewska-Borys		Mint: Mennica Polska S.A.	
Value: zł 10	Alloy: Ag 925/1000 (Silver)	Quantity: 60,000 pcs	Quality: Proof
Issued: 6 June 2001	Diameter: 32.00 mm (1.26 in)	Weight: 14.14 g (0.50 oz; 0.45 ozt)	Market value: 80 zł
Obverse: An image of the Eagle as the State Emblem of the Republic of Poland. Above the Eagle a semicircular inscription: RZECZPOSPOLITA POLSKA (Republic of Poland). Below the Eagle inscriptions: on the ribbon SOLI DEO and on the left side: ROK (year), on the right side: 2001. Below a semicircular inscription: ZŁOTYCH 10 ZŁOTYCH. Under the left talon of the Eagle the Mint mark: m/w. Reverse: An image of the Priest Cardinal Stefan Wyszyński on the background of an outline of the Saint John Cathedral in Warsaw. On the left side the dates: 1901 + 1981. Above a semicircular inscription: KS. KARDYNAŁ STEFAN WYSZYŃSKI (Priest Cardinal Stefan Wyszyński). On the side an inscription: 100. ROCZNICA URODZIN (100th anniversary of the birth), repeated three times, separated by stars.
Polish Kings and Princes: Bolesław III Krzywousty (1102–1138)
Obverse designer: Ewa Tyc-Karpińska, Reverse designer: Ewa Olszewska-Borys		Mint: Mennica Polska S.A.	
Value: zł 100	Alloy: Au 900/1000 (Gold)	Quantity: 2,000 pcs	Quality: Proof
Issued: 27 June 2001	Diameter: 21.00 mm (0.83 in)	Weight: 8.00 g (0.28 oz; 0.26 ozt)	Market value: 3.500 zł
Obverse: An image of the Eagle as the State Emblem of the Republic of Poland, on its sides the notation specifying the year of mintage: 2001, under the Eagle description: ZŁ 100 ZŁ, in the rim an inscription: RZECZPOSPOLITA POLSKA. Under the left talon of the Eagle the Mint mark: m/w. Reverse: A bust of the prince Bolesław III Krzywousty. Around an inscription: BOLESŁAW III KRZYWOUSTY 1102–1138.
XII Henry Wieniawski International Violin Competition (gold)
Coin designer: Robert Kotowicz		Mint: Mennica Polska S.A.	
Value: zł 200	Alloy: Au 900/1000 (Gold)	Quantity: 2,000 pcs	Quality: Proof
Issued: 12 September 2001	Diameter: 27.00 mm (1.06 in)	Weight: 15.50 g (0.55 oz; 0.50 ozt)	Market value: 4.000 zł
Obverse: On the background of stylised musical notation: a figure of a violinist. On the left side an image of the Eagle as the State Emblem of the Republic of Poland, below an inscription: dolce ma sotto voce, and an inscription: 200/ZŁ; on the right side the notation specifying the year of mintage: 2001. Below a semicircular inscription: RZECZPOSPOLITA POLSKA. Under the left talon of the Eagle the Mint mark: m/w. Reverse: An image of Henryk Wieniawski. Under it a stylised facsimile of Henryk Wieniawski's signature. On the side an inscription: XII MIĘDZYNARODOWY KONKURS SKRZYPCOWY IM. HENRYKA WIENIAWSKIEGO (XII Henry Wieniawski International Violin Competition), separated by a star.
XII Henry Wieniawski International Violin Competition (silver)
Coin designer: Robert Kotowicz		Mint: Mennica Polska S.A.	
Value: zł 10	Alloy: Ag 925/1000 (Silver)	Quantity: 28,000 pcs	Quality: Proof
Issued: 12 September 2001	Diameter: 32.00 mm (1.26 in)	Weight: 14.14 g (0.50 oz; 0.45 ozt)	Market value: 150 zł
Obverse: On the background of stylised violin and piano music stand an image of the Eagle as the State Emblem of the Republic of Poland, below three violins. On the left side the notation specifying the year of mintage: 2001, on the right side an inscription: 10 ZŁ. Above a semicircular inscription: RZECZPOSPOLITA POLSKA. Under the left talon of the Eagle the Mint mark: m/w. Reverse: An image of Henryk Wieniawski. Under it a stylised facsimile of Henryk Wieniawski's signature. On the left side a stylised image of a violinist. Above, in the background, a stylised piano keyboard. On the side an inscription: XII MIĘDZYNARODOWY KONKURS SKRZYPCOWY IM. HENRYKA WIENIAWSKIEGO (XII Henry Wieniawski International Violin Competition), separated by a star.
Polish Kings and Princes: Jan III Sobieski (1674–1696)
Coin designer: Ewa Tyc-Karpińska		Mint: Mennica Polska S.A.	
Value: zł 100	Alloy: Au 900/1000 (Gold)	Quantity: 2,200 pcs, 2,000 pcs	Quality: Proof
Issued: 3 October 2001	Diameter: 21.00 mm (0.83 in)	Weight: 8.00 g (0.28 oz; 0.26 ozt)	Market value: 3.500 zł
Obverse: An image of the Eagle as the State Emblem of the Republic of Poland, on the sides of the Eagle the notation specifying the year of mintage: 2001, under the Eagle an inscription: ZŁ 100 ZŁ, in the rim an inscription: RZECZPOSPOLITA POLSKA. Under the left talon of the Eagle the Mint mark: m/w. Reverse: A bust of the King Jan III Sobieski. Below a panoply: a shield (kałkan – a decorative Oriental shield), batons, spiked clubs and an inscription: JAN III SOBIESKI. Above on the sides of the image of the King the dates: 1674 and 1696.
Polish Kings and Princes: Jan III Sobieski at Vienna (bust)
Coin designer: Ewa Tyc-Karpińska		Mint: Mennica Polska S.A.	
Value: zł 10	Alloy: Ag 925/1000 (Silver)	Quantity: 24,000 pcs	Quality: Proof
Issued: 12 September 2001	Diameter: 32.00 mm (1.26 in)	Weight: 14.14 g (0.50 oz; 0.45 ozt)	Market value: 300 zł
Obverse: An image of the Eagle as the State Emblem of the Republic of Poland, on the sides of the Eagle the notation specifying the year of mintage: 2001, under the Eagle an inscription: ZŁ 10 ZŁ, in the rim an inscription: RZECZPOSPOLITA POLSKA preceded and followed by five beads. Under the left talon of the Eagle the Mint mark: m/w. Reverse: A bust of the King Jan III Sobieski on the background of a fragment of a bass-relief based on Jan Matejko painting "Jan III pod Wiedniem" ("Jan III at Vienna"). Above a semicircular inscription: JAN III SOBIESKI 1674–1696.
Polish Kings and Princes: Jan III Sobieski (torso)
Coin designer: Ewa Tyc-Karpińska		Mint: Mennica Polska S.A.	
Value: zł 10	Alloy: Ag 925/1000 (Silver)	Quantity: 17,000 pcs	Quality: Proof
Issued: 12 September 2001	Diameter: 32.00 mm (1.26 in)	Weight: 14.14 g (0.50 oz; 0.45 ozt)	Market value: 600 zł
Obverse: An image of the Eagle as the State Emblem of the Republic of Poland, on the sides of the Eagle the notation specifying the year of mintage: 2001, under the Eagle an inscription: ZŁ 10 ZŁ, in the rim an inscription: RZECZPOSPOLITA POLSKA preceded and followed by five beads. Under the left talon of the Eagle the Mint mark: m/w. Reverse: Half-figure of the King Jan III Sobieski. On the right side a semicircular inscription: JAN III SOBIESKI. Below the dates: 1674/1696.
Polish Travelers and Explorers: Michał Siedlecki (1873–1940)
Coin designer: Ewa Tyc-Karpińska		Mint: Mennica Polska S.A.	
Value: zł 10	Alloy: Ag 925/1000 (Silver)	Quantity: 26,000 pcs	Quality: Proof
Issued: 7 November 2001	Diameter: 32.00 mm (1.26 in)	Weight: 14.14 g (0.50 oz; 0.45 ozt)	Market value: 150 zł
Obverse: An image of the Eagle as the State Emblem of the Republic of Poland. On the right side, an inscription: ROK 2001. Below a stylised images of two fish of tropical seas, corals and marine plants. Above a semicircular inscription: RZECZPOSPOLITA POLSKA 10 ZŁ. Under the left talon of the Eagle the Mint mark: m/w. Reverse: An image of Michał Siedlecki. On the left side an inscription: MICHAŁ / SIEDLECKI, below in a circle fauna of sea plankton in various microscopic enlargements by Michał Siedlecki's drawing. Below, the dates 1873 / 1940.
The Polish Calendar of Traditional Customs and Rituals: Carolers
Coin designer: Robert Kotowicz		Mint: Mennica Polska S.A.	
Value: zł 20	Alloy: 925/1000 Ag oxidised and zirconium	Quantity: 55,000 pcs	Quality: Standard
Issued: 5 December 2001	Diameter: 38.61 mm (1.52 in)	Weight: 28.28 g (1.00 oz; 0.91 ozt)	Market value: 800 zł
Obverse: An image of the Kraków's crib with an image of the Eagle as the State Emblem of the Republic of Poland incorporated in a gate. On the right side, in the background of a fragment of the crib an inscription: 20 / ZŁ. On the left side below, a notation of the year of issue: 2001. Upwards a semicircular inscription: RZECZPOSPOLITA POLSKA. Under the left talon of the Eagle the mint mark: m/w. Reverse: In the central part a group of carolers with a star in zirconium. In the background willows, church and cottages. On the left and on the right bush branches. Below an inscription: KOLĘDNICY (carolers).

== See also ==
- Numismatics
- Regular issue coinage
- Coin grading
