= Quartweet =

A quartweet (or #quartweet) is a musical composition for string quartet of 140 notes or less (280 since 2017), reflecting the maximum number of characters in a Twitter message (a tweet).

== Project ==
The #quartweet project was initiated by Xandi van Dijk and launched by the Signum Quartet (previously BBC New Generation Artists) in 2015 together with the Princeton Symphony Orchestra.

Among the initial, prominent composers to sign onto the project were Derek Bermel, Sebastian Currier, Steven Mackey, Caroline Shaw and Sarah Kirkland Snider. The composer Matthijs van Dijk also contributed to launch the project, along with Bruno Mantovani and Konstantia Gourzi.

The quartet is also asking composers "of all ages and abilities" to submit their works under the hashtag "quartweet" on Twitter. The project is a Social Media experiment that intends to put more music into the way we communicate online.
