= Aleksandra Gryka =

Polish classical composer of experimental music

- Born: 17 May 1977 (age 49)
- Education: Academy of Music in Kraków
- Occupation: composer
- Awards: Prize of the Christoph and Stephan Kaske Foundation

Aleksandra Gryka (born 17 May 1977) is a Polish classical composer of experimental music. Her works have been performed at such festivals as the Warsaw Autumn, Sacrum Profanum and Juilliard Focus! Festival.

== Early life and education ==
Aleksandra Gryka was born on 17 May 1977, in Warsaw. She started learning to play the piano at the age of six. In 2003, she graduated with honors in composition under the supervision of Krystyna Moszumańska-Nazar and computer composition under Magdalena Długosz at the Academy of Music in Kraków. During her studies, she also took composition courses in Kraków, Helsinki, Buckow and Reichenau.

== Career ==
Her work is characterized as uncompromising and experimental. Although the structure of her works stems from modernist traditions, what is most important to her is originality and timbre. Gryka writes pieces for instruments, although she also explores electronic music. She draws inspiration from various sources, including the works of Iannis Xenakis, Frédéric Chopin and Gérard Grisey. She feels drawn to spectralism and sonorism.

Gryka's compositions have been performed, among others, in Germany, France, Great Britain, Italy and the United States. Her works could be heard at such festivals, as the Warsaw Autumn (2003: world premiere of Interialcell), Sacrum Profanum and Juilliard Focus! Festival. Gryka's work has appeared in the repertoire of, among others, an_ARCHE new music ensemble and Kwadrofonik. In 2005, she started composing music for theater performances. In 2006, the futuristic ballet Alpha Kryonia xe by choreographer Jacek Przybyłowicz was staged at the Grand Theatre in Warsaw, to which Gryka composed music. The piece was inspired by the works of Stanisław Lem.

== Works ==
- For D. for piano solo, 1999
- LIEN-AL for cello, harpsichord and accordion, 2000
- High3bbingNor. for symphony orchestra, 2000
- Interioryzacion for computer, 2000
- OXYGEN nr.369,1 for tape and piano, 2001
- NonStopping center for harpsichord solo, 2001
- (1”)exists as…(-1”) for flute, accordion, piano, 3 percussions and cello, 2001
- Project ien for tape, video and dancer, 2002
- JaIchIJe for string quartet and marimba, 2002
- Interialcell for instrumental ensemble, 2003
- Alpha Kryonia XE ballet, 2003
- eSU for tape and video elements, 2004
- konstrunity 0100 for 12 voices, 2004
- Tii for soprano and instrumental ensemble from opera saga Komander Kobayashi, 2004–2005
- ambeoidal MTOCSs for clarinet, marimba, piano, violin, tape and video, 2005
- NTvacou for contrabass recorder, harpsichord, violin and cello, 2006
- SCREAM YOU, opera from the Kommander Kobayashi II project, 2006
- Youmec for harpsichord and tape, 2006
- {FFO.NO.}e for cello, 2007
- BAe 146 OY-CRG.Sylar for instrumental ensemble, 2007
- NEI for violin, tape and video, 2008
- SCREEM QUEEN opera, developed in collaboration with NOVOFLOT, 2008
- t.Aamiper for orchestra, trumpet solo and electronics, 2009
- The LighetM for string quartet, 2009
- Erschöpfung opera, developed in collaboration with NOVOFLOT, 2010
- Glück opera, developed in collaboration with NOVOFLOT, 2011
- einerjedeneither for orchestra, 2011
- observerobserver for Paetzold flute, double-bass flute and video, 2012
- 10,12,13,-31 for string quartet, 2012
- das Schloss opera, developed in collaboration with NOVOFLOT, 2013
- Der Sieg Uber die Sonne opera, developed in collaboration with NOVOFLOT, 2013
- A.CELLfalserator for 2 pianos, 2013
- W.ALTER’s(Z) for mezzo-soprano, 2 pianos, 2 percussionists and electronics, 2014
- |H_He| for choir, multipercussion and electronics, 2014
- mutedisorder quartet for clarinet/bass clarinet, violin, piano and percussion instruments, 2015
- emptyloop for string quartet, 2020
- PLASTIC for electronics/samples, 2021

== Awards and nominations ==
- 2000: first prize at the EuroArtMeeting Composition Competition in Wrocław for the song High3bbingNor
- 2003, 2006: nominations for the Paszport Polityki award
- 2004: Prize of the Christoph and Stephan Kaske Foundation for electroacoustic work
- 2006: nomination for the TVP Kultura Award
- 2009: nomination for the "Cogito" Public Media Award
- 2012: award for music to the play Trash Story at the 12th National Festival of Contemporary Dramaturgy "Rzeczywistość Przedstawiona" in Zabrze
