= Silhouette (band) =

Dutch progressive rock band

- Origin: Netherlands
- Genres: Progressive rock, neo-prog
- Labels: Progress Records, Freia Music
- Members: Brian de Graeve; Erik Laan; Rob van Nieuwenhuijzen; Daniel van der Weijde; Jurjen Bergsma
- Past members: Gerrit-Jan Bloemink; Jos Uffing
- Website: www.silhouetteband.nl

Silhouette is a Dutch progressive rock band from Utrecht. So far, the band has released five albums. Their music is influenced by bands such as Genesis, Pink Floyd, and Marillion, but also by more recent music. The Dutch Oor Pop Encyclopedie lists Silhouette under the category of progressive rock, while other sources refer to their music as neo-prog.

Silhouette's fourth album, Beyond the Seventh Wave, received the iO Pages Prog Award 2014 for the best prog album that was released in Belgium and the Netherlands in that year. The band's manager, Kathy Keller, of My Music Matters-MT promotion company was active during the release phase of the album. Silhouette left in 2017 for record label management.

== Band members ==
Current

- Brian de Graeve – vocals, guitar
- Erik Laan – vocals keyboards, bass pedals
- Rob van Nieuwenhuijzen – drums, percussion
- Daniel van der Weijde – guitar
- Jurjen Bergsma – bass

Live

- Bart Laan – guitar

Former

- Gerrit-Jan (GJ) Bloemink – bass (until 2014)
- Jos Uffing – drums, vocals and acoustic guitars (until 2013)

== Discography ==
- A-maze (2007)
- Moods (2009)
- Across the Rubicon (2012)
- Beyond the Seventh Wave (2014)
- Staging the Seventh Wave (2017, live album)
- The World is Flat and Other Alternative Facts (2017)
