= Anna Korsun =

Ukrainian musician (born 1986)

- Born: 1986 (age 39–40); Donetsk, Ukrainian Soviet Socialist Republic, Soviet Union
- Education: Kyiv Conservatory; Musikhochschule München
- Occupations: Vocalist; Pianist; Organist; Conductor; Composer; Academic teacher
- Organizations: Conservatorium van Amsterdam
- Awards: Villa Massimo; Berliner Kunstpreis
- Website: annakorsun.com

Anna Korsun (Ukrainian: Анна Корсун, born 1986) is a Ukrainian singer, pianist, organist, conductor, composer and academic teacher, based in Germany. Her works have been performed at major European festivals.

== Life ==
Born in Donetsk, Korsun studied at the Kyiv Conservatory from 2005 to 2009, graduating as a bachelor of arts, and at the Musikhochschule München with Moritz Eggert from 2010 to 2012, completing as a Master of Arts. She has performed as a vocalist, pianist, organist and conductor. Her compositions explore the human voice and traditional instruments in connection with electronic means. She has used elements of theatre, video and choreography in her works. She co-organised concert series such as Evening of Low Music in Munich, 6+1 of vocal music in Moscow and Kyiv, and Ereignishorizont, of organ music, in Cologne. Her work has been performed at festivals including Warsaw Autumn, the Darmstädter Ferienkurse, the Musikfest der MGNM, Musica Viva in Lisbon, and the Stockhausen Concerts and Courses in Kürten. She has collaborated with performers such as Neue Vocalsolisten Stuttgart, SWR Vokalensemble, ensemble modern, the Bayerische Theaterakademie August Everding, the Thuringia Symphony Orchestra, and the Baltic Sea Philharmonic.

Korsun was awarded a scholarship at the Villa Massimo in Rome in 2018. She has been a fellow of composition for the festivals at Akademie Schloss Solitude in 2014 and at Schloss Wiepersdorf in 2021.

Korsun has been on the faculty of the Conservatorium van Amsterdam from 2018, and has given international master classes.

== Work ==
Her works Ulenflucht, published by Schott and recorded by Wergo in 2019, were awarded the Preis der deutschen Schallplattenkritik. Her portrait CD contains five compositions for 20 singing and playing performers. The title refers to the moment in the evening when owls begin their flight. Her Marevo for two singing saws, two violins, two cellos and piano was played by ensemble modern at the Wittener Tage für neue Kammermusik in 2020. They performed it again on 10 March 2022 in a charity concert for Ukraine at the Alte Oper.

== Awards ==
The jury of the Open Ear Award, that she received in Amsterdam in 2018, noted that she was an independent sensitive musician who created poetic works, driven by her experience as a performer.

- 2014: Gaudeamus International Composers Award
- 2017: Prize of the Christoph and Stephan Kaske Foundation
- 2018: Berliner Kunstpreis
- 2018: Villa Massimo
- 2018: Open Ear Award, Amsterdam
