= No Joke! =

Studio album by Meat Puppets
- Released: October 3, 1995
- Recorded: 1995
- Studios: Phase Four, Phoenix, Arizona, Westlake, Los Angeles, California
- Genres: Alternative metal; grunge
- Length: 54:51
- Label: London
- Producers: Meat Puppets, Paul Leary

Meat Puppets chronology
Too High to Die (1994)	No Joke! (1995)	Live in Montana (1999)

Singles from No Joke!
- 1. "Scum" Released: 1995; 2. "Taste of the Sun" Released: 1996

No Joke! is the ninth studio album by the Meat Puppets. The album was released on October 3, 1995, by London Records. It was the follow-up to the band's album Too High to Die and was the last Meat Puppets album with bassist Cris Kirkwood (until his reunion on 2007's Rise to Your Knees) and drummer Derrick Bostrom (until 2019's Dusty Notes). A video was filmed for the song "Scum", directed by Dave Markey.

== Artwork ==
The cover art "no joke" used on the album was originally created by Curt Kirkwood's daughter, which the band chose to use as the album's title and cover art.

== Music ==
In September 2000, Al Shipley wrote that No Joke! had a "droning alt-metal sensibility".

== Reception ==
Professional ratings
Review scores
Source	Rating
AllMusic	2/5 stars
The Austin Chronicle	2/5 stars
Christgau's Consumer Guide	(neither)
Entertainment Weekly	B+
Rolling Stone	4/5 stars

Stephen Thomas Erlewine of AllMusic described No Joke! as an "average" Meat Puppets record, explaining that although the songs were "competent", it lacked the "wild spark" and "bizarre sense of humor" that characterized their 1980s work.

Eric Flaum of Rolling Stone was more praising, awarding the album 4-out-of-5 stars and stating that No Joke! showed the band's creativity at "full throttle".

== Track listing ==
All songs written by Curt Kirkwood, except where noted.

No.	Title	Writer(s)	Length
1.	"Scum"		3:53
2.	"Nothing"		6:27
3.	"Head"		4:17
4.	"Taste of the Sun"		3:58
5.	"Vampires"		4:35
6.	"Predator"		4:31
7.	"Poison Arrow"		3:12
8.	"Eyeball"		4:04
9.	"For Free"		4:29
10.	"Cobbler"	Cris Kirkwood	3:25
11.	"Inflatable"	Cris Kirkwood	3:28
12.	"Sweet Ammonia"		4:17
13.	"Chemical Garden"		4:15

== Personnel ==
Meat Puppets

- Derrick Bostrom - drums, paintings
- Cris Kirkwood - bass, vocals, illustrations
- Curt Kirkwood - guitar, vocals, paintings

Technical

- Paul Leary - producer

== Chart performance ==
Album - Billboard (North America)

Year	Chart	Position
1995	The Billboard 200	183
