= Prize of the Christoph and Stephan Kaske Foundation =

German music award

The Prize of the Christoph and Stephan Kaske Foundation (Preis der Christoph-und-Stephan-Kaske-Stiftung) is an annual award for promotion of new music. It was founded in 1988 by Karlheinz and Christiane Kaske in memory of their sons Christoph and Stephan. The Christoph and Stephan Kaske Foundation has its legal seat in Munich. The aim is to promote young, promising interpreters and composers in the field of new music. The award is endowed with € 10,000. The selection of the winner is made by a board of trustees. The prize is awarded in a ceremony at the Künstlerhaus am Lenbachplatz.

== Recipients ==
- 1989: Hans Peter Haller
- 1990: Pierre Boulez
- 1991: Steffen Schleiermacher
- 1993: György Ligeti
- 1994: André Richard
- 1995: Robyn Schulkowsky
- 1996: Wolfgang Rihm
- 1997: Mario Davidovsky
- 1998: Hans-Jürgen von Bose
- 1999: Gottfried Michael Koenig
- 2000: Péter Eötvös
- 2001: Kaija Saariaho
- 2002: Christoph Poppen
- 2004: Aleksandra Gryka
- 2004: Mateusz Bien
- 2005: Márton Illés
- 2006: Mark Andre
- 2007: Jörg Widmann
- 2008: Konstantia Gourzi
- 2008: Minas Borboudakis
- 2009: Enno Poppe
- 2010: Wilhelm Killmayer
- 2011: Adriana Hölszky
- 2013: Josef Anton Riedl
- 2013: Nico Sauer
- 2013: Luis Codera Puzo
- 2014: Isabel Mundry
- 2015: Erkki-Sven Tüür
- 2015: Klarenz Barlow
- 2015: Curtis Roads
- 2016: Georges Aperghis
- 2017: Anna Korsun
- 2018: Mikis Theodorakis
- 2019: Olga Neuwirth
- 2020: Peter Michael Hamel
- 2022: Elena Mendoza
- 2023: Vladimir Tarnopolski

=== Commissions ===
- 2024: Festspiele Mecklenburg-Vorpommern
- 2024: Sinem Altan
- 2024: Bahar Royaee
- 2024: Pascal Hahn
- 2025: Judit Varga
- 2025: Vasilikí Krimitzá
- 2026: Duo Lechner & Márquez
