= Hardaker =

Hardaker is a surname. Notable people with the surname include:

- Alan Hardaker (1912–1980), English football administrator
- Caroline Hardaker (born 1986), English poet and novelist
- Claire Hardaker (linguist) (born 1981), English forensic and corpus linguist
- Julie Hardaker (born 1960), New Zealand lawyer and mayor
- Sara Hardaker (born 1975), British professional badminton player
- Zak Hardaker (born 1991), English rugby league player
