= Backwater (song) =

Single by Meat Puppets

from the album Too High to Die
- Released: 1994
- Genre: Grunge; alternative rock; hard rock
- Length: 6:03 (2 track version); 12:26 (3 track version); 17:30 (5 track version)
- Label: London Records
- Songwriter: Curt Kirkwood

Meat Puppets singles chronology
| "Whirlpool" (1991) | "Backwater" (1994) | "We Don’t Exist" (1994) |

Music video
- Backwater on YouTube

"Backwater" is a song written and recorded by American alternative group Meat Puppets. It was released in 1994 by London Records, as the first single from the group's eighth studio album, Too High to Die (1994). The single was released in three versions: one promo CDS and two singles, and is the Meat Puppets' most successful single. The highest position in the US was No. 39 and 47 on the Cash Box Top 100 and Billboard Hot 100 charts. It also reached No. 2 on the Billboard Album Rock Tracks chart, No. 11 on the Billboard Modern Rock Tracks chart and No. 31 on the Billboard Mainstream Top 40 chart. The 3 track single features a cover of the Feederz.

They Might Be Giants sing back-up vocals on the b-side "White Sport Coat".

== Track listing ==
(All songs by Curt Kirkwood unless otherwise noted)

2 track single track listing

1. "Backwater" – 3:39
2. "Station" (Cris Kirkwood) – 2:20

3 track promo single track listing

1. "Backwater" – 3:39
2. "Lake of Fire" (1994 re-recorded version) - 3:13
3. "Fuck You" (Feederz cover) – 5:31

5 track single track listing

1. "Backwater" – 3:39
2. "Open Wide" – 3:13
3. "Animal" – 4:33
4. "Up on the Sun" (1994 re-recorded version) – 3:49
5. "White Sport Coat" (Marty Robbins cover) – 2:12

== Charts ==
| Chart (1994) | Peak position |
|---|---|
| US Billboard Hot 100 | 47 |
| US Alternative Airplay (Billboard) | 11 |
| US Mainstream Rock (Billboard) | 2 |
| US Cash Box Top 100 | 39 |
