= You Love Me =

You Love Me may refer to:

- You Love Me (EP), a 1999 EP by the Meat Puppets
- You Love Me (novel), a 2021 novel by Caroline Kepnes
- "You Love Me?", a 2015 song by Melissa Steel
- "You Love Me", a song by Kelly Clarkson from the album Stronger
- "Tumhen Mohabbat Hai Humse" (lit. 'You Love Me'), a song from the 1962 Indian film Ek Musafir Ek Hasina
