= We Don't Exist =

Promotional single by Meat Puppets

from the album Too High to Die
- Released: 1994
- Genre: Hard rock
- Label: London Records
- Songwriter: Curt Kirkwood

Meat Puppets singles chronology
"Backwater" (1994)	"We Don't Exist" (1994)	"Tender Cuts" (1994)

"We Don't Exist" is the first promotional single from the Meat Puppets album Too High to Die. Released in 1994, it includes two versions of "We Don’t Exist" and the Marty Robbins cover "El Paso City". The Marty Robbins cover is also released on the Raw Meat EP.

== Track listing ==
(All songs by Curt Kirkwood unless otherwise noted)

1. "We Don't Exist" (remix) - 3:46
2. "We Don't Exist" - 3:45
3. "El Paso City" (Marty Robbins) - 3:43

The Australian release features the above, plus a live version of 'Lake of Fire'.

== Music video ==
The music video for "We Don't Exist" has the band playing in a black-and-white town. It was nominated for Best Rock Video at the 1995 MTV Video Music Awards.

== Chart performance ==
Chart (1994)	Peak position
US Album Rock Tracks	28
