= Southern Edge vol. 1 =

Compilation album by Various Artists
- Released: January 26, 1999
- Length: 46:03
- Label: Beloved Records

Professional ratings
Review scores
Source	Rating
Allmusic	link

Southern Edge vol. 1 was a compilation released in 1999.

== Track listing ==
1. Jawbox - "Savory" - 4:42
2. Webb Wilder - "Tough It Out" - 3:57
3. Meat Puppets - "Sam" - 3:10
4. Ben Folds Five - "Jackson Cannery" - 3:26
5. The Reverend Horton Heat - "Time to Pray" - 2:42
6. Agents of Good Roots - "Miss America" - 3:02
7. Doug Hoekstra - "Sam Cooke Sang the Gospel" - 4:45
8. The Jayhawks - "Blue" (live) - 3:14
9. Better Than Ezra - "Southern Gürl" - 4:08
10. Cake - "Rock and Roll Lifestyle" - 4:16
11. The Reverend Horton Heat - "Slow" - 4:26
12. Southern Culture on the Skids - "White Trash" - 2:06
13. Man...or Astroman - "Manta Ray" - 2:18
