= Claire Hardaker =

British linguist

- Born: 16 January 1981 (age 45); Dewsbury, United Kingdom
- Children: 3
- Awards: Part of the team awarded the Queen's Anniversary Prize for Higher and Further Education

Academic background
- Education: Lancaster University
- Thesis: Trolling in computer-mediated communication: Aggression and deception online (2012)
- Doctoral advisor: Jonathan Culpeper

Academic work
- Discipline: Linguist
- Sub-discipline: Forensic linguistics; Corpus linguistics
- Institutions: Lancaster University
- Website: Hardaker on the website of Lancaster University

Claire Hardaker (born 16 January 1981) is a British linguist. She is a professor at the Department of Linguistics and English Language of Lancaster University, United Kingdom. Her research involves forensic linguistics and corpus linguistics. Her research focuses on deceptive, manipulative, and aggressive language in a range of online data. She has investigated behaviours ranging from trolling and disinformation to human trafficking and online scams. Her research typically uses corpus linguistic methods to approach forensic linguistic analyses.

She has worked in the Department of Linguistics and English Language at Lancaster University since 2013.

== Career and research ==
Hardaker received her MA in Language Studies in 2007, and her PhD in Linguistics in 2012 from Lancaster University. She taught English Language and Linguistics at the University of Central Lancashire as an associate lecturer, and then as a lecturer from 2007 to 2012. In 2013 she took a position as lecturer in Forensic Corpus Linguistics in the Department of Linguistics and English Language at Lancaster University, and was promoted to Senior Lecturer in Forensic Corpus Linguistics in 2017.

Hardaker has been principal investigator (PI) and co-investigator (CI) on research grants from the UK's Economic and Social Research Council (ESRC). As part of the £5 million ESRC Centre for Corpus Approaches to Social Sciences (CASS), Hardaker has investigated different manifestations of online abuse, including strategies, motivations, and responses. Hardaker has also been CI on projects funded by Her Majesty's Government, and co-researcher on research funded by the European Commission, investigating anti-trafficking, and the deployment of anti-trafficking funds across the European Union.

Hardaker has appeared on television and radio, and in documentaries, podcasts, and print media around the world on topics ranging from online abuse, to the Word of the Year, to the language of children online, to the decryption of the Voynich manuscript. Her research has been discussed in the House of Commons, and she has written for The Guardian and The Observer, The Independent, The Conversation, the Political Studies Association, among others.

Hardaker serves on the editorial board of Internet Pragmatics, directs the Forensic Linguistics Research Group (FORGE) at Lancaster University, is the co-creator of the free software, FireAnt, designed to collect, filter, and export Twitter data, and she publishes a monthly podcast entitled en clair. Each episode typically covers a case involving forensic linguistics, language mysteries, literary detection, decryption of codes and undeciphered languages, and other forms of linguistic intrigue.

== Awards and honors ==
Hardaker's ESRC-funded research on online abuse, undertaken within Lancaster University's Centre for Corpus Approaches to Social Sciences (CASS) subsequently assisted CASS in being awarded The Queen's Anniversary Prize for Higher and Further Education.

== Personal life ==
Hardaker was born in Dewsbury, and grew up in the small village of Tyersal in Bradford. She attended Tong High School until 1995, and sat her A Levels at Bradford College.

== Selected publications ==
- C. Hardaker. "Trolling in asynchronous computer-mediated communication: From user discussions to academic definitions." Journal of Politeness Research. Language, Behaviour, Culture 6(2). 215–242. 2010.
- C. Hardaker. "'Uh.... not to be nitpicky, but… the past tense of drag is dragged, not drug.': An overview of trolling strategies." Journal of Language Aggression and Conflict 1(1). 58–86. 2013.
- C. Hardaker and M. McGlashan. "'Real men don’t hate women;' Twitter rape threats and group identity." Journal of Pragmatics 91. 80–93. 2016.
- C. Hardaker. "'I refuse to respond to this obvious troll': an overview of responses to (perceived) trolling. Corpora 10 (2). 201–229. 2015.
- C. Hardaker. Corpus Linguistics for Forensic Linguistics: Research and Practice – Routledge Corpus Linguistics Guides. Taylor & Francis Ltd. 2021.

== External sources ==
• Faculty web page at Lancaster
