= Konstantia Gourzi =

Greek composer

Konstantía Gourzí (Greek Κωνσταντία Γουρζή, born 31 March 1962 in Athens) is a Greek composer and conductor. She is professor of ensemble conducting and new music at the University of Music and Performing Arts Munich.

== Life and studies ==
Born in Athens, Konstantia Gourzi received her first piano lessons at the age of seven. At thirteen, she joined the conservatorium in Athens, where she studied composition and conducting as well as piano. From 1987 to 1992, she continued her studies at Hochschule der Künste Berlin. There, she founded her first ensemble attaca berlin.

During her studies in Berlin, Konstantia Gourzi completed masterclasses with composers such as Péter Eötvös, Hans Werner Henze, Wolfgang Rihm, Karlheinz Stockhausen, Walter Zimmermann; and with conductors like Michael Gielen, Carlo Maria Giulini, Bernard Haitink, Giuseppe Sinopoli and Günter Wand. An important mentor was Diether de la Motte. From 1988 to 1992, Gourzi assisted Claudio Abbado with the Berliner Philharmoniker. From 1993 to 1996, she worked closely with György Kurtág. In 1992 and 1994 she was a laureate of Deutscher Musikrat and in 1995, she won second prize at the International Competition for Conductors of Contemporary Music in Paris. Konstantia Gourzi has been awarded several international scholarships, for example from the Onassis Foundation and Deutscher Akademischer Austauschdienst. In 2008, she received the Prize of the Christoph and Stephan Kaske Foundation for her work as a conductor and composer, and for her innovative performance concepts.

Konstantia Gourzi has been professor of ensemble conducting and new music at the University of Music and Performing Arts Munich since 2002.

== Ensembles and concert series ==
In 1991, Konstantia Gourzi founded the attacca berlin ensemble, which she directed until 1996. Its main focus was music of the 20th century. With attacca berlin, she also realized the international concert project "time zones", supported by the Berlin Senate for Cultural Affairs. The ensemble also worked with the Berliner Festwochen, and various other music festivals. There were numerous radio recordings.

From 1999 to 2007, Gourzi was artistic director of ensemble echo at the Hochschule für Musik "Hanns Eisler" in Berlin. There she initiated the concert series anschläge 1, 2, [...] and concerto fresco. She collaborated with Deutsche Guggenheim Berlin, Staatsoper Unter den Linden in Berlin, Konzerthaus and Akademie der Künste Berlin. In her time as artistic director, numerous radio recordings were made.

As a professor at the University of Music and Performing Arts in Munich, she founded the ensemble oktopus für musik der moderne in 2002, which she still conducts today. Together with the ensemble she has initiated various concert series such as "Neue Musik und Improvisation", "Konzert mit Solisten" and "Neue Musik International". From 2003 to 2008, she managed the concert series "Junge Solisten" of the Siemens Arts Program in cooperation with the University of Music and Performing Arts Munich. Meanwhile, there are numerous recordings of the Bayerischer Rundfunk and CD recordings. Cooperations existed a.o. with the Pinakothek der Moderne, the gallery camera artis, the Künstlerhaus München, the Bayerische Theaterakademie August Everding, and the Munich Biennale.

In 2007, Konstantia Gourzi founded the network and ensemble opus21musikplus, with the aim of bringing music across borders to other art forms and musical genres. In 2007, the ensemble released their first CD: Schoenberg's Pierrot Lunaire plus Jazz, and Berio's Folksongs. They also collaborated with the Franz Marc Museum and the Bayerische Akademie der schönen Künste, and there are ongoing projects with diverse music institutions and festivals. The ensemble designed the concert series "Neue griechische Musik in München" (New Greek Music in Munich), and performed many times on radio. From 2008 to 2013, Konstantia Gourzi organised an education program with opus21musikplus at elementary schools in Munich. This was supported by the Bayerisches Kultusministerium, the Kulturreferat München, and the Ernst von Siemens Music Foundation, among others. Konstantia Gourzi still is the artistic director of the ensemble.

== Artistic activities ==
=== Composition ===
Konstantia Gourzi's compositional work includes works for solo instruments, chamber music, choir and orchestra. She has received important commissions from the Deutsche Staatsoper Berlin, the Frankfurt Radio Symphony, the Bayerischer Rundfunk, the Ensemble Musica Nova Israel, the State Orchestra Athens, the Festspiele Europäische Wochen Passau, the Kasseler Tage für Neue Musik, the Ex Novo Ensemble in Venice, the Munich Chamber Orchestra, the Bavarian State Opera Munich, the Archbishopric of Munich and Freising, the Patrimonio Nacional Spain, the Bavarian State Ministry, the Lucerne Festival, the ARD International Music Competition, the BBC, the Staatsphilharmonie Nürnberg, and the Bamberg Symphony Orchestra. In her assignments and projects she has often been supported by the Ernst von Siemens Music Foundation.

In 2002, the premiere of her first orchestral composition Mykene took place under her own direction with the Frankfurt Radio Symphony. In the same year, she was the first woman to conduct Verdi's La Traviata at the State Opera Athens. Under commission from the Staatsoper Unter den Linden, Gourzi transformed Haydn's Philemon and Baucis into an innovative play by means of her own compositions. This work was reperformed at the Spring Festival Budapest and the Festival European Church Music Schwäbisch Gmünd.

Konstantia Gourzi was Composer in Residence at the 58th Festival Europäische Wochen Passau, at the festival Aktuelle Musik in Nuremberg, and in 2017/2018 she was a scholar of the Internationales Künstlerhaus Villa Concordia in Bamberg. At the ION Festival in Nuremberg, the work Paharión, the Red Angel in the Garden of Las Huelgas was premiered in June 2018 as a concert in motion. In addition, she composed the compulsory piece for viola Evening at the window for the ARD International Music Competition 2018. In October 2018, the work Transformation – A staged musical work, as a signal against child abuse, commissioned by the Archbishopric of Munich and Freising in collaboration with the Pontifical Gregorian University in Rome, was premiered in the church of Sant'Ignazio. This is the first artistic commission from the Catholic Church, on this subject.

=== Conducting ===
Konstantia Gourzi has conducted many world premieres. She develops new program concepts, with the aim to give a new focus as well as to combine old and new. In this capacity, she has been artistic director of the Samos Young Artists Festival in Greece (2012). In addition to her own ensembles, she conducted and conducts orchestras such as the Frankfurt Radio Symphony, SWR Sinfonieorchester Baden-Baden and Freiburg, Deutsche Radiophilharmonie Saarbrücken, Münchner Rundfunkorchester, Orchester Philharmonique de Strasbourg, Young Israel Philharmonic Orchestra, Patras Chamber Orchestra (Greece), State Opera and Orchestras of the Greek Radio Athens, Klangforum Wien, Israel Chamber Orchestra, Ensemble New Music Moscow, Chamber Orchestra of the Bavarian State Opera, and the Lucerne Academy Orchestra.

Her work as a conductor and her compositions are documented in detail, through radio recordings, television broadcasts and live streams (Arte, ZDF, WDR, SR, RBB, SWR and BR). Her extensive discography includes recordings of her compositions and of her conducted works, for example published by ECM, NEOS, NAXOS, and SONY-Classical.

== Compositions (selection) ==
Konstantia Gourzi's works are published in the "Edition Gourzi" special edition, by Höflich.

=== Orchestra (selection) ===
- op. 5: 7 Miniaturen in 3 Sätzen (1991) For string orchestra. 1st prize at the Fanny-Mendelssohn Composers’ Competition. Duration: 13 min. Live recording.
- op. 17: Mykene – 7 Miniaturen für Orchester (2002). Commissioned by Hessischer Rundfunk Frankfurt. Duration: 17 min. Radio recording.
- op. 27: Five Songs for Lefkas (2005) For string orchestra. Commissioned by the Lefkas Festival. Duration: 14 min.
- op. 28: Gedichte zu Prometheus (2005) for orchestra. Commissioned by the Munich Chamber Orchestra with support from the Greek Press and Information Office for Southern Germany. Duration: 20 min. Radio recording.
- op. 37: Easter in Konstantinopel – because of the Words. 11 moments between East and West (2009/10). For orchestra, choir, a Byzantine style psalm singer and improvising solo violinist (5 stringed tenor violin and double stringed violin). Commissioned by Münchner Rundfunkorchester. Duration: 43 min. Radio recording.
- op. 39: Drei Synapten zu Ehren der Seligen Gisela (2009/10) for orchestra. Commissioned by the Stiftung art 31 with support from the Ernst von Siemens Music Foundation. Duration: 15 min. Radio recording.
- op. 51: Six letters for Callas: Α Π Ο ΛΛ Ω Ν (2012/13) for orchestra. Commissioned by the State Orchestra of Athens (KOA). Duration: 14 min. Live recording.
- op. 57: Eros (2014/15) for two sopranos and chamber orchestra. Commissioned by the Bayerische Staatsoper. Duration: 15 min. Live recording.
- op. 65: Ny-él, Two Angels in the White Garden (2015/16) – Hommage à Claudio Abbado and Pierre Boulez. For orchestra. Commissioned by Lucerne Festival. Duration: 17 min. Radio recording.

=== Chamber music (selection) ===
- op. 33/2: P-ILION, neun fragmente einer ewigkeit (2007). String quartet no. 2. Commissioned by the Kasseler Musiktage. Duration: 12 min. CD recording, ECM New Series 2309.
- op. 35: kastalia (2008). For string quartet and harp. Commissioned by Harry Otten for the harpist Lavinia Meijer and the Athena String Quartet. Duration: 13 min. Live recording.
- op. 38: Vibrato 1 and 2 (2010). For string quartet and piano. Commissioned by Festspiele Europäische Wochen Passau 2010. Duration: 8 min. CD recording, ECM New Series 2309.
- op. 40: Polymnia (2010). For two guitars, viola, double bass. Commissioned by Festspiele Europäische Wochen Passau 2010 with support from the Ernst von Siemens Music Foundation. Duration: 10 min. Live recording.
- op. 56: Hommage à Mozart – three dialogues (2014). For viola and piano. Commissioned by Nils Mönkemeyer and William Youn. Duration: 20 min. Radio recording.
- op. 61: Anájikon, the Angel in the Blue Garden (2015). String quartet no. 3. Duration: 22 min. Radio recording.
- op. 73: Wunder (2017/18). 7 Fragmente. For percussion solo and ensemble. Commissioned by Bavarian State Opera. Duration: 16 min. Radio recording
- op. 76: Transformation (2018). A staged musical work, as a signal against child abuse. Seven Stations for two sopranos, two mezzo-sopranos, male voice choir, children’s choir, seven instrumental soloists, dancers, and audience. Commissioned by the Archdiocese Munich and Freising, as part of the opening ceremony of the Licentiate in Safeguarding offered by the Centre for Child Protection at the Pontifical Gregorian University in Rome. Duration: 70 min. Television recording

=== Choir (selection) ===
- op. 52: „…il vento del nord…“ (2013). For vocal ensemble. 2 sopranos, mezzo-soprano, tenor, bass. Commissioned by vocal ensemble La Dolce Maniera. Duration: 5 min. Live recording.
- op. 55: Ave Maria (2014). For women’s choir. Duration: 3 min. Radio recording.
- op. 62: Paharión, the Red Angel in the Garden of las Huelgas (2015). 15 dialogues between West and East for Schola Antiqua, a Byzantine style psalm singer, violin, ney, clarinet/bass clarinet. Commissioned by Patrimonio Nacional España. Duration: 60 min. Live recording.
- op. 71: “Der Engel der Eewigkeit” (2017). Seven Views – Hommage à Adolf Wölfli. For mixed choir. Commissioned by the association Wölfli&Musik for the Ensemble Corund Lucerne. Duration: 16 min.

=== Instrumental Solo (selection) ===
- op. 4: Anaménontas (1990). For flute solo. Duration: 7 min. Live recording.
- op. 8: "noch fürcht' ich" (1993). For piano solo. Duration: 9 min. CD recording, ECM New Series 2309.
- op. 23: "Sängerin der Komischen Oper" (2004). 7 miniatures for viola solo, inspired by the painting of the same title by Paul Klee. Duration: 12 min. Live recording.
- op. 24: Klavierstücke I-V (2004). For piano solo. Duration: 8 min. CD recording, ECM New Series 2309.
- op. 25: Eine kleine Geschichte (2005). For piano solo. Duration: 5 min. CD recording, ECM New Series 2309.
- op. 49: nine lullabies for a new world (Hommage a J.S. Bach) (2012). For viola solo. Commissioned by Nils Mönkemeyer. Duration: 10 min. CD recording, Sony Classical 1964503.
- op. 54: meditation I (2013/2015). For marimba solo, glockenspiel and singing bowl. Commissioned by Kana Omori. Duration: 9 min. CD recording, HCOM Japan 1027.
- op. 68: Astrolávos, the Angel at the Bottom of the Sea (2015/16). Nine constellations for oboe solo. Commissioned by Francois Leleux. Duration: 11 min. Radio recording.
- op. 72: Wind dances (2017). Hommage à Federico Mompou. For piano solo. Commissioned by Maria Canyigueral for her project “Avant-guarding Mompou” with the support of the Arts Council England. Duration: 5 min.
- op. 75: Evening at the Window (2017/18). For viola solo. Commissioned by the ARD Music Competition 2018, funded by the Ernst von Siemens Music Foundation. Duration: 10 min. Radio recording

=== Opera / Soundtrack (selection) ===
- op. 18: Philemon und Baucis (2003). Opera fragment by Joseph Haydn. For chamber orchestra and singer-actors. Commissioned by Deutsche Staatsoper Berlin. Konstantia Gourzi completed this fragmentary work by Joseph Haydn with her own composition and integrated it into a new artistic concept. Duration: 90 min. Live recording.
- op. 26: "Warchild" (2005). Music for Christian Wagner’s film “Warchild”. Duration: 60 min. CD recording, NORMAL 895932. DVD recording, Label Filmgalerie 451, 45380.

== Discographie ==
=== Konstantia Gourzi as composer ===
- Siguiriya Gitana (2015). Kana Omori, Marimba. Published by HCO Music.
- Konstantia Gourzi: Music for Piano and String Quartet (2014). Lorenda Ramou and Ensemble Coriolis. Published by ECM Records.
- Nils Mönkemeyer: Bach und Mehr (2013). Published by Sony Classical.
- Freyja Gunnlaugsdóttir: Skrímsli (2012). Published by Tiara Records.
- Konstantia Gourzi: Conjunctions – Synápsies (2010). Apollon Musagète quartet, Vassilis Agrokostas, Michalis Cholevas, Christian Elsässer, Konstantia Gourzi. Published by NEOS.
- Konstantia Gourzi: Warchild (2006). ensemble oktopus (String orchestra), Slava Cernavca (clarinet), Susanne Winter (soprano), Ferran Cruixent (piano), Konstantia Gourzi (conductor). Published by Normal (Indigo).
- "Punkt 11": Neue und neuere Musik (2003). CD series of Hochschule für Musik und Theater München, no. 39.
- Berlinisches Tagebuch. Zeitgenössische Klaviermusik (1994). Yoriko Ikeya-Fuchino, Klavier. Published by Crescendo/Thorofon.

=== Konstantia Gourzi as conductor ===
- Tripp (2018). Music by Amos Elkana. Meitar Ensemble, Konstantia Gourzi (conductor). Published by Albany Records.
- Liederwelten und instrumentale Poesie – Wilhelm Killmayer zum 85. Geburtstag (2012). Hochschule für Musik und Theater München in cooperation with BR-Klassik.
- Hans-Werner Henze: Guitar Music 2 (2010). Franz Halàsz (guitar), Anna Torge (mandolin), Cristina Bianchi (harp), ensemble oktopus, Konstantia Gourzi (conductor). Published by NAXOS.
- Arnold Schoenberg: Pierrot lunaire plus Jazz / Luciano Berio: Folk Songs (2007). Stella Doufexis, Maria Baptist, Ensemble opus21musikplus, Konstantia Gourzi (conductor). Published by NEOS.
- Olga Neuwirth (1998). Klangforum Wien. Peter Eötvös, Konstantia Gourzi (conductors). Published by Accord.
- Silhouettes – Berlin Young Composers between today and tomorrow (1991). Boris Blacher Ensemble, Konstantia Gourzi (conductor). Published by Zensor musicproduction.
