= Nico Sauer =

Nico Sauer (born November 9, in Munich) is a German composer, theater director, performance artist and multimedia artist.

== Life and education ==
Nico Sauer studied composition with Wolfgang Rihm and Markus Hechtle (BA, University of Music Karlsruhe, 2010–2015), Michael Jarrell (University of Music Geneva 2012–2013), Manos Tsangaris and Franz Martin Olbrisch (MA, Hochschule für Musik Carl Maria von Weber, 2015–2018).

During his education, his work was exposed to audiences in Germany, Spain, France, Italy, Japan and Russia.

== Work ==
Nico Sauer's work combines instrumental and electronic music, video art, performance art and theater. He seeks artistic antagonists which are supposed to endanger a perception of art to a degree at which a new perception is made possible. The artist as a social sculpture plays an important role in the presentation and communication of his work.

In NeueMusik24-TV and on NeueMusik24.de, music is reduced to a literary form of sound ideas which are marketed and communicated as anti-capitalist products.

Deutsch-Afrika (2014, National Theatre Karlsruhe) is a critical introspective on the contemporary music scene and European supremacy and colonialism.

In Composing Life (2015, Karlsruhe, Essen) Sauer performed a motivational coach, preaching the liberating power of contemporary music, a Millennial grotesque of Joseph Beuys.

Love Me (2016, German Hygiene Museum, Dresden) is a concert-installation on artistic identity, reproduction and masquerade, involving over a hundred clones of the composer and a super slow motion version of an Elvis Presley song.

Salary Music (2016, ZeitPunkt, Osaka) is a series of 'invisible pieces' to be performed in public spaces and everyday life situations.

Lab 317 (National Theatre Stuttgart, 2017) is a performative theatre-installation that picks up the discourse on European cultural centralism by claiming to breed a super-race of musical geniuses.

wwwwwwwf (Sprechsaal Berlin, La FDP Paris, 2018) is the performed artistic encounter of Tanya Wenczel (Australia) and Sauer in a trans-humanistic wrestling match.

With Taxi Boat Nico (Berlin, 2019) Sauer founded Berlin's first private water way transportation enterprise, a disguised series of artistic advertising campaigns and real-life performances on the questions of being and living as a contemporary artist.

In 2020, he co-founded the non-profit production organization bigger space Isabell Ohst and Vincent Wikström, where he is working in artistic direction and production. In 2020, bigger space produced a music podcast named Musikmusikmusik (in German) in which composers, musicians and performers talk about their favorite music. In 2021, bigger space is realizing a virtual festival on the moon, which is premiered in summer '21.

Since 2020, he is frequently working in Paris and Strasbourg.

== Works (selection) ==
- Der barhändige Wanderer singt in der Anwesenheit des Diebes, Ensemble piece, 2014
- Suite für Snare and 128 instruments, Solo for snare drum and electronics, 2013
- Deutsch-Afrika 2014, Chamber opera with electronics, voices und computer voices. Commissioned by the National Theatre Karlsruhe and the Hoepfner Foundation, 2014.
- Composing Life, performance, Essen, Karlsruhe, 2015.
- Labor 317, Music theater, Staatstheater Stuttgart, Labor Nord. Commissioned by SKAM, 2017
- LOVE ME, Music theater, Deutsches Hygiene-Museum Dresden, El Perro Andaluz, commissioned by Ernst-Werner von Siemens Foundation, 2016
- On Yellow Pyramids And Learning To Fly Them, Solo Performance, white noise, Stuttgart, Agora, Berlin. Commissioned by SKAM, 2017.
- The AcouSuit , Installation/Performance. Commissioned by Spor Festival, Aarhus, Denmark
- Teleform Centrum. Commissioned by Festival Musica, Stasbourg, France, 2018
- Accelerando, UA mit Isao Nakamura. Commissioned by the German Nation Radio, 2015
- Reel B Music, Mini compositions on Instagram Reels, since 2021
- Ears of a Composer, Monthly radio show on Cashmere Radio, Berlin, since 2020
- Moonbreaker 2121, a music festival on the moon. As composer and artistic director. Funded by Musikfonds, 2021
- Nearest Neighbors, Radialsystem Berlin, 2025
- The Canteen - A real opera, Staatstheater Darmstadt, Theater Münster, 2026
- Oh, Mom! - A non-euclidean Sitcom, Deutsches Theater, 2026

== Awards and scholarships ==
- 2012–2018 Scholarship of German sponsorship organization for the academically gifted
- 2013 Scholarship of the Hoepfner Foundation Karlsruhe
- 2014 Prize of the Christoph and Stephan Kaske Foundation
- 2016 YourTurn Award for YouTube Creators
- 2024 AI Research Scholarship by Musikfonds e.V.

== Writings ==
- My years in the Wolfgang-Rihm-Wizard School, MusikTexte, 2025
- Qu'est-ce que c'est B-Musique? Vorbei an einer neuen Musikphilosophie. Positionen, Berlin, 2020. Ausgabe #125 Kunst > Wirklichkeit?
- Was ist situatives Komponieren?. Master-Arbeit im Studiengang Komposition, 2018, Berlin.
