= Monsters (Meat Puppets album) =

Studio album by Meat Puppets
- Released: October 1989
- Recorded: 1987–89
- Studio: For the Record, Orange, California
- Genre: Hard rock; heavy metal
- Length: 46:01 (Original); 59:46 (Reissue)
- Label: SST (253)
- Producer: Meat Puppets

Meat Puppets chronology
Huevos (1987)	Monsters (1989)	No Strings Attached (1990)

Singles from Monsters
- 1. "Light" Released: 1989

Monsters is the sixth studio album by the American rock band Meat Puppets, released in October 1989 by SST Records, their final studio release for the label.

It was reissued on Rykodisc in 1999 with additional bonus tracks, recording notes by Derrick Bostrom and liner notes by music journalist Mark Kemp. As a bonus, the reissue includes an "Enhanced CD" partition for play on home computers. Monsters offers the promotional video for "Light". The clip was produced and directed by Bill Taylor and features shots of the Puppets live in concert.

== Background ==
Derrick Bostrom stated in 1999 that the album originated with demos for major labels, but that the band decided to record Monsters with SST anyway because it took too long for majors to take notice. Kirkwood added that the album had been a response to acts like Bon Jovi and that with Monsters he wanted to show that the Meat Puppets could be a mainstream rock band.

== Musical style ==
Monsters was described as a "heavy rock attack" by Stephen Thomas Erlewine in an AllMusic biography of the band, while Roaul Hernandez of The Austin Chronicle remarked that the record was "metal all the way". Greg Prato stated that the Monsters was best described as a "cross" of the two preceding Meat Puppets albums, Huevos and Mirage.

== Reception ==
Professional ratings
Review scores
Source	Rating
AllMusic	3/5 stars
Chicago Tribune	3.5/4 stars
Robert Christgau	A−
The Encyclopedia of Popular Music	3/5 stars
NME	6/10
Spin Alternative Record Guide	6/10

AllMusic's Greg Prato gave a mixed review of Monsters, commenting that while songs were "hindered" by "synth textures" and individual instrument recording, the record had "several highlights" including a "vicious" album opener in "Attacked by Monsters", and the "tough rocker" "The Void".

== Track listing ==
All songs written by Curt Kirkwood.

No.	Title	Length
1.	"Attacked by Monsters"	4:43
2.	"Light"	4:15
3.	"Meltdown"	3:06
4.	"In Love"	3:50
5.	"The Void"	6:32
6.	"Touchdown King"	6:07
7.	"Party Till the World Obeys"	4:20
8.	"Flight of the Fire Weasel"	3:16
9.	"Strings on Your Heart"	5:10
10.	"Like Being Alive"	4:42

CD reissue bonus tracks
No.	Title	Length
11.	"Wish Upon a Storm"	4:27
12.	"Flight of the Fire Weasel, Pt. 1"	4:25
13.	"Flight of the Fire Weasel, Pt. 2"	4:44

== Personnel ==
- Curt Kirkwood – guitar, vocals
- Cris Kirkwood – bass, vocals
- Derrick Bostrom – drums
