= The Edge of Rock =

Compilation album by Various Artists
- Released: 1990
- Length: 10 at 37:32
- Label: K-Tel Records

Professional ratings
Review scores
Source	Rating
Allmusic	3/5 stars

The Edge of Rock was a compilation released in 1990. It contains 10 tracks including covers of Suzanne Vega's "Luka," Status Quo's "Pictures of Matchstick Men," and The Cure's "Just Like Heaven."

== Track listing ==
1. Camper Van Beethoven - "Pictures of Matchstick Men" (Francis Rossi) - 4:10
2. Lucinda Williams - "I Just Wanted to See You So Bad" (Lucinda Williams) - 2:27
3. Dinosaur Jr - "Just Like Heaven" (Simon Gallup/Robert Smith/Porl Thompson/
  Lol Tolhurst) - 2:55
4. Winter Hours - "Roadside Flowers" (Michael Carlucci[Joseph Marques/Bob Perry) - 5:40
5. Close Lobsters - "Lovely Little Swans" (Andrew Burnett/Tom Donnelly/Stewart McFayden/
  Bob Burnett/Graeme Wilmington) - 3:46
6. Syd Straw - "Future 40's" (Jody Harris/Michael Stipe/Syd Straw) - 4:29
7. Mary's Danish - "Can I Have a Smoke, Dude?" (Julie Ritter/Gretchen Seager/Chris Wagner) - 2:00
8. Meat Puppets - "Light" (Curt Kirkwood) - 4:18
9. The Lemonheads - "Luka" (Suzanne Vega) - 3:10
10. Wire - "In Vivo" (Bruce Gilbert/Robert Gotobed/Graham Lewis/Colin Newman) - 4:36
