= Taste of the Sun =

Single by Meat Puppets

from the album No Joke!
- Released: 1996
- Genre: Alternative rock
- Label: London Records
- Songwriter(s): Curt Kirkwood

Meat Puppets singles chronology
"Scum" (1995)	"Taste of the Sun" (1996)	"Armed and Stupid" (2000)

"Taste of the Sun" is a song by Meat Puppets, the second single released from No Joke!, along with three alternative versions and four other songs.

== Track listing ==
(All songs by Curt Kirkwood unless otherwise noted)

1. "Taste of the Sun" (radio version) – 3:56
2. "Taste of the Sun" – 3:59
3. "The Adventures of Pee Pee the Sailor" – 2:53
4. "Vampires" (live) – 4:31
5. "Chemical Garden" (live) – 4:20
6. "Tennessee Stud" (Jimmy Driftwood) – 3:29
7. "Taste of the Sun" (Mark Trombino Mix) – 3:53
8. "Taste of the Sun" (live) – 3:56
- Track 2 is on No Joke!
- Tracks 4, 5 and 8 were recorded live November 26, 1995
