= Huevos (album) =

Studio album by Meat Puppets
- Released: October 27, 1987
- Recorded: August 3–7, 1987
- Studio: Pantheon, Phoenix, Arizona
- Genre: Alternative rock; blues rock; hard rock
- Length: 36:25 (original); 58:05 (reissue)
- Label: SST (150)
- Producer: Steven Escallier, Meat Puppets

Meat Puppets chronology
Mirage (1987)	Huevos (1987)	Monsters (1989)

Singles from Huevos
- 1. "I Can't Be Counted On" Released: 1987

Professional ratings
Review scores
Source	Rating
AllMusic	link
New Musical Express	6/10
The Village Voice	A−

Huevos is the fifth studio album by the American rock band Meat Puppets, released on October 27, 1987, by SST Records. The album title is the Spanish word for "eggs".

The 1999 Rykodisc re-release features five unreleased bonus tracks (early demos of "Sexy Music", "Paradise", "Fruit" and "Automatic Mojo" and a cover of Jimmy Reed's "Baby What You Want Me to Do") as well as live footage of "Automatic Mojo" filmed at the band's January 22, 1988 concert at the Variety Arts Center in Los Angeles.

== Background and music ==
Most of the songs were recorded in one take. The cover art is done by guitarist/vocalist Curt Kirkwood. The album title is the Spanish word for "eggs", although it carries a slang meaning associated with testicular fortitude.

In an AllMusic biography of the band, Stephen Thomas Erlewine described the sound of Huevos as "ZZ Top-style hard rock swagger". Matthew Smith Lahrman cataloged the record to be a blues rock effort.

== Track listing ==
All songs written by Curt Kirkwood, unless otherwise noted.

Original album

1. "Paradise" (Curt Kirkwood, Cris Kirkwood) – 5:00
2. "Look at the Rain" – 4:20
3. "Bad Love" (Curt Kirkwood, Cris Kirkwood) – 3:10
4. "Sexy Music" – 5:28
5. "Crazy" – 4:45
6. "Fruit" – 3:30
7. "Automatic Mojo" (Curt Kirkwood, Cris Kirkwood) – 3:19
8. "Dry Rain" – 2:55
9. "I Can't Be Counted On" (Curt Kirkwood, Cris Kirkwood) – 3:58

CD reissue bonus tracks

10. "Baby What You Want Me to Do" (Jimmy Reed) – 1:29
11. "Sexy Music" (Demo Version) – 6:40
12. "Automatic Mojo" (Demo Version) – 3:56
13. "Paradise" (Demo Version) – 4:06
14. "Fruit" (Demo Version) – 5:20

== Personnel ==
- Curt Kirkwood – guitar, vocals, cover
- Cris Kirkwood – bass, vocals, illustration
- Derrick Bostrom – drums
