= Live in Montana =

Live album by Meat Puppets
- Released: February 23, 1999
- Recorded: December 7 & 8, 1988
- Venue: Sundance Club (Bozeman, Mont.); Top Hat Club (Missoula, Mont.)
- Genre: Alternative rock
- Length: 59:11
- Label: Rykodisc
- Producer: Meat Puppets, David Claassen

Meat Puppets chronology
No Joke! (1995)	Live in Montana (1999)	You Love Me (EP) (1999)

Professional ratings
Review scores
Source	Rating
AllMusic	link
Rolling Stone	link

Live in Montana is a 1999 live album by the Meat Puppets. It is compiled from two December 1988 shows.

It was released simultaneously with the re-issues of the SST back catalogue. The album includes covers of Elvis Presley, Lionel Hampton, UTFO, Roy Orbison, Holocaust and Black Sabbath.

== Track listing ==
All songs written by Curt Kirkwood unless otherwise noted

1. "Touchdown King" – 5:30
2. "Cotton Candy Land" (Ruth Batchelor, Bob Roberts) – 2:49
3. "Automatic Mojo" (Curt Kirkwood, Cris Kirkwood) – 4:14
4. "Plateau" – 3:48
5. "Maiden’s Milk" (Curt Kirkwood, Cris Kirkwood) – 3:57
6. "Lake of Fire" – 3:00
7. "I Can’t Be Counted On" (Curt Kirkwood, Cris Kirkwood) – 3:22
8. "Liquified" – 2:50
9. "Dough Rey Mi" (Nat King Cole, Lionel Hampton, Tommy Southern) – 4:15
10. Medley #1: – 16:01
  - "S.W.A.T. (Get Down)" (Bedeau, Campbell, Charles, Clarke, Fequiere, B. George, L. George, P. George, Reeves)
  - "Attacked by Monsters"
  - "Blue Bayou" (Joe Melson, Roy Orbison)
11. "Party Till the World Obeys" – 3:41
12. Medley #2: – 6:53
  - "The Small Hours" (John Mortimer)
  - "Paranoid" (Geezer Butler, Tony Iommi, Ozzy Osbourne, Bill Ward)
  - "Sweet Leaf" (Geezer Butler, Tony Iommi, Ozzy Osbourne, Bill Ward)
