= Eric Flaum =

American music journalist (1961–1997)

- Born: 1961
- Died: March 18, 1997 (aged 35–36)
- Occupation: Music journalist
- Employer: Rolling Stone

Eric R. Flaum (1961 – March 18, 1997) was an American music critic and author who wrote for several magazines, including The Bob. He later worked as production manager at Rolling Stone.

== Bibliography ==
Flaum wrote three books:

- The Planets: A Journey Into Space (1988)
- Discovery: Exploration Through the Centuries (1990)
- The Encyclopedia of Mythology (1995)

He also contributed to Garcia, Rolling Stone's book about the Grateful Dead.

== Personal life ==
Flaum was born in 1961.

He was married to Seija, with whom he had a son and a daughter.

== Death ==
Flaum died on Long Island, New York, in 1997, aged 35.
