= Bronisław Pięcik =

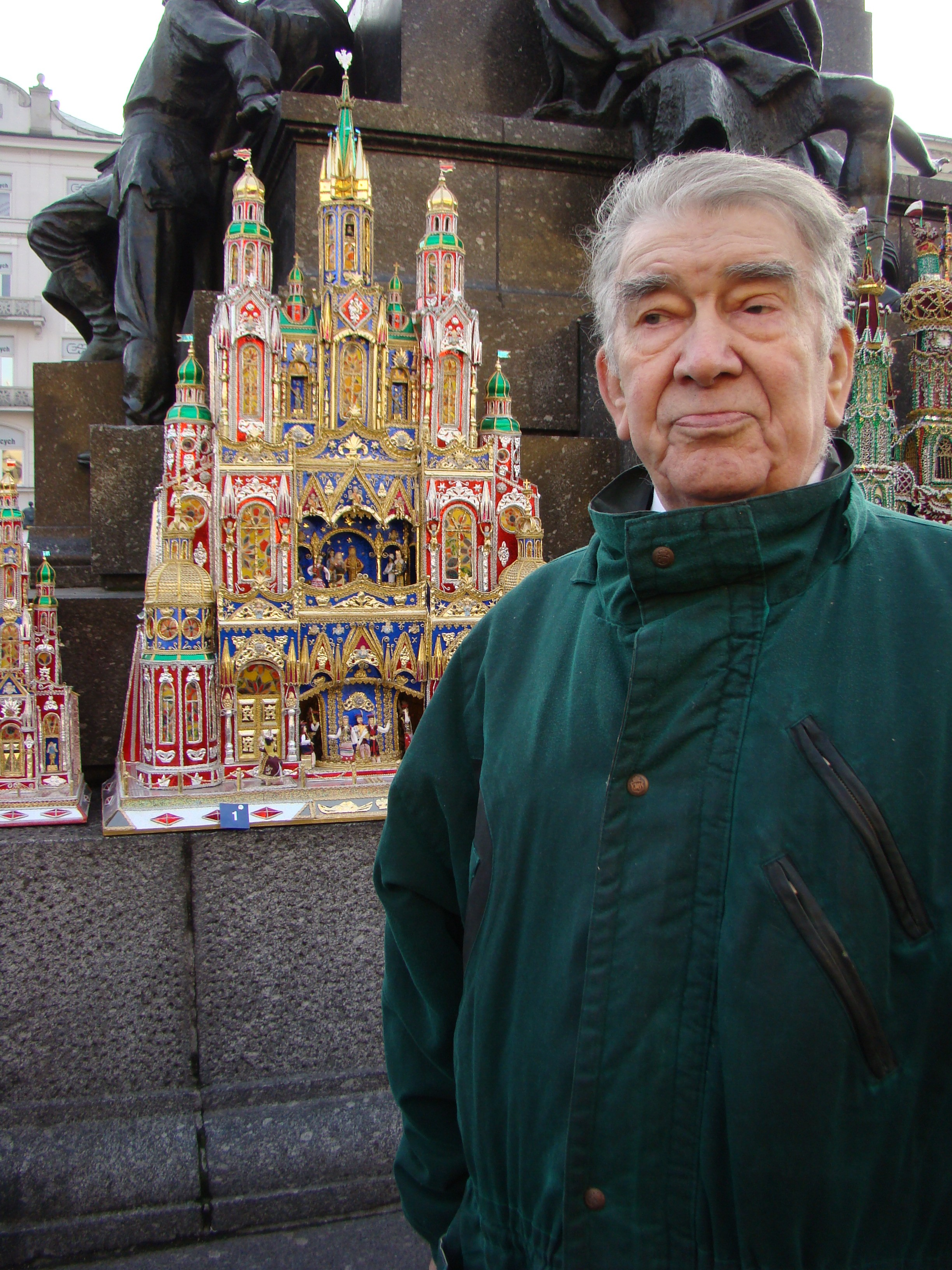
Bronisław Pięcik and his Kraków szopka for the 2008 competition

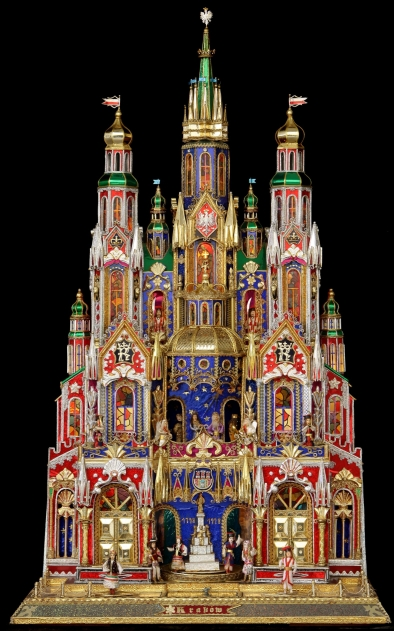
Kraków szopka made by Bronisław Pięcik in 1998, housed at the Krzysztofory Museum in Kraków's Main Square

Bronisław Pięcik (Polish pronunciation: [brɔˈɲiswaf ˈpjɛɲt͜ɕik]; 1936 – March 25, 2010) was a Polish precision mechanic who was renowned for the elaborate medium and large-sized Nativity scenes called Kraków szopka that he built. Pięcik first took part in the Kraków Nativity Scene Contest in 1962. By the time of his death in 2010, he had competed a total of 41 times in the contests, placing first 22 times in multiple categories.

== Kraków szopka ==
While Pięcik mainly built the Kraków szopka himself, he also worked on some of them with his wife Maria and his granddaughter Roksana Rutkowska. Each szopka would generally take him upwards of a thousand hours to build, while some took even more than that. For example, his szopka entry for 2004 took him more than 1,000 hours to build. He constructed his szopka according to the characteristics of the genre, which meant that they only contained historical, architectural elements found in Kraków as the backdrop. He was particularly fond of using buildings found along the Royal Route in Kraków in his szopka, which he knew like the back of his hand. In 2003, Pięcik and his granddaughter Roksana Rutkowska took 1st place in the middle-sized division with their 172 cm tall szopka that reproduced in minute detail the Veit Stoss altarpiece from St. Mary's Basilica in Kraków.

More than a dozen of his nativity scenes are housed in the szopka collection of the Historical Museum of Kraków. Many others are in private collections. His prize-winning szopka from 2004 was sold to a collector in Denmark. While working in Kuwait, Pięcik built a Kraków szopka that is housed at a cathedral in Baghdad, Iraq.

== Placings ==
- 1967 – 1st place together with Tadeusz Gillert, Maciej Moszew, and Witold Głuch

=== Medium-sized Kraków szopka ===
- 1977 – 1st place
- 1982 – 1st place
- 1989 – 1st place together with Andrzej Morański and Ryszard Kijak
- 1997 – 1st place
- 1998 – 1st place together with Roman Sochacki
- 2002 – 1st place
- 2003 – Pięcik and Roksana Rutkowska shared 1st place with Roman Sochacki and Marek Głuch
- 2009 – 1st place

=== Large-sized Kraków szopka ===
- 1979 – 1st place
- 1980 – 1st place
- 1983 – 1st place
- 1993 – 1st place together with Witold Głuch
- 1999 – 1st place
- 2000 – 1st place
- 2001 – 1st place
- 2002 – 1st place
- 2003 – shared 1st place with Tadeusz Gillert, Piotr Stremecki and Małgorzata Malicka
- 2004 – 1st place
- 2005 – 1st place
- 2006 – 1st place
- 2007 – shared 1st place with Leszek Zarzycki
- 2009 – shared 2nd place with Władysław Słaboński
