= Too High to Die =

Studio album by Meat Puppets
- Released: January 25, 1994
- Recorded: 1993
- Studios: The Warehouse, Memphis, Tennessee
- Genres: Alternative rock; grunge
- Length: 52:06
- Label: London
- Producers: Meat Puppets, Paul Leary

Meat Puppets chronology
Forbidden Places (1991)	Too High to Die (1994)	No Joke! (1995)

Singles from Too High to Die
- 1. "Backwater" Released: 1994; 2. "We Don't Exist" Released: 1994; 3. "Roof with a Hole" Released: 1994; 4. "Lake of Fire" Released: 1994

Too High to Die is the eighth studio album by American rock band the Meat Puppets. The album was released on January 25, 1994, by London Records. It was produced by Butthole Surfers guitarist Paul Leary. The album's title is a parody of the Ramones' 1984 album Too Tough to Die.

A limited edition of Too High to Die included the 10" vinyl promo EP Raw Meat. The cover art on this limited edition features more color than the simply pink-toned normal cover.

The album was supported by a lengthy tour, which included spots opening for the likes of Blind Melon, Soul Asylum, and Stone Temple Pilots (and shortly before the album's release, Nirvana).

== Reception and legacy ==
Professional ratings
Review scores
Source	Rating
AllMusic	4/5 stars
Christgau's Consumer Guide	(1-star Honorable Mention)
The Encyclopedia of Popular Music	3/5 stars
Entertainment Weekly	B−
Los Angeles Times	3/4 stars
Rolling Stone	4/5 stars
Spin Alternative Record Guide	8/10

Too High to Die sold very well due to the success of its single "Backwater", which reached No. 2 and No. 11 on the Billboard Mainstream Rock Tracks and Modern Rock Tracks charts respectively. The album reached No. 1 on the Heatseekers chart, making it one of the Meat Puppets' most successful and highest ranking albums to date. The album was certified gold by the RIAA on October 6, 1994.

Ian Christe in his May 1994 review for CD Review wrote, "At best, this disc shows a mellow maturation of the quirky poetry on the Puppets' early SST records, when they used punk's freedom to write their own language for love of life."

The rarely-seen video for "We Don't Exist" was nominated for "Best Metal/Hard Rock Video" at the 1995 MTV Video Music Awards, but lost to White Zombie's "More Human than Human".

In May 2012, the title of a book about the Meat Puppets' history borrowed part of the album's title, Too High to Die: Meet the Meat Puppets.

In July 2014, Guitar World placed Too High to Die at number 44 in their "Superunknown: 50 Iconic Albums That Defined 1994" list.

== Track listing ==
All songs written by Curt Kirkwood, unless otherwise noted.

No.	Title	Writer(s)	Length
1.	"Violet Eyes"		3:51
2.	"Never to Be Found"		4:46
3.	"We Don't Exist"		3:44
4.	"Severed Goddess Hand"		2:59
5.	"Flaming Heart"		4:49
6.	"Shine"		3:50
7.	"Station"	Cris Kirkwood	2:22
8.	"Roof with a Hole"		3:34
9.	"Backwater"		3:42
10.	"Things"		4:06
11.	"Why?"		4:20
12.	"Evil Love"	Cris Kirkwood	3:07
13.	"Comin' Down" (features "Lake of Fire" as a hidden track)		6:56

== Personnel ==
Meat Puppets

- Derrick Bostrom – drums, paintings
- Cris Kirkwood – bass guitar, vocals, illustrations
- Curt Kirkwood – guitar, vocals, paintings

Production

- Greg Calbi – mastering
- Dave Jerden – mixing
- Paul Leary – producer, mixing
- Meat Puppets – producer
- Stuart Sullivan – engineer, mixing
- Brad Vosburg – engineer
- G.E. Teel – assistant engineer
- Josh Kiser – assistant
- Michael Halsband – photography

== Charts ==
Album – Billboard (United States)

Chart (1994)	Peak position
Billboard Heatseekers	1
US Billboard 200	62

Singles – Billboard (United States)

Year	Single	Chart	Position
1994	"Backwater"	Mainstream Rock Tracks	2
1994	"Backwater"	Modern Rock Tracks	11
1994	"Backwater"	The Billboard Hot 100	47
1994	"Backwater"	Top 40 Mainstream	31
1994	"We Don't Exist"	Mainstream Rock Tracks	28
