= Classic Puppets =

Compilation album by Meat Puppets
- Released: February 3, 2004
- Recorded: 1981
- Genre: Alternative rock; cowpunk; hard rock; post-punk; psychedelic rock
- Length: 1:17:08
- Label: Rykodisc

Meat Puppets chronology
Live (2002)	Classic Puppets (2004)	Rise to Your Knees (2007)

Classic Puppets is a 2004 compilation CD by American rock band the Meat Puppets. It is composed of material from 1981 to 1989 (as well as a previously unreleased track from the Golden Lies period).

== Reception ==
Professional ratings
Review scores
Source	Rating
AllMusic	3/5 stars
Creem	(NR)
The Encyclopedia of Popular Music	4/5 stars

In a three out-of five star review, Sean Westergaard of AllMusic remarked that Classic Puppets "does a decent job" anthologizing the band's output with SST Records, but that the compilation "seems almost like an afterthought" and "comes off as a bit lackluster."

== Track listing ==
All songs written by Curt Kirkwood, unless otherwise noted.

1. "Foreign Lawns" (Meat Puppets) - 0:38
2. "H-Elenore" - 1:38
3. "Blue Green God" (Meat Puppets) - 1:22
4. "Walking Boss" (Doc Watson) – 2:40
5. "Lost" - 3:28
6. "Plateau" - 2:23
7. "Lake of Fire" - 1:57
8. "The Whistling Song" - 2:58
9. "Up on the Sun" - 4:03
10. "Swimming Ground" - 3:06
11. "Enchanted Porkfist" - 2:31
12. "Two Rivers" - 3:21
13. "Out My Way" - 4:50
14. "On the Move" - 3:50
15. "Burn the Honky Tonk Down" (Wayne Kemp) - 1:59
16. "Confusion Fog" - 3:51
17. "Get On Down" - 2:56
18. "Look At the Rain" - 4:20
19. "Sexy Music" - 5:30
20. "Dough Rey Mi" (Woody Guthrie) - 3:40
21. "Light" - 4:19
22. "Strings On Your Heart" - 3:40
23. "Meltdown" - 3:35
24. "New Leaf" - 4:20
