= Kraków szopka =

Nativity scene from Kraków

- UNESCO Intangible Cultural Heritage
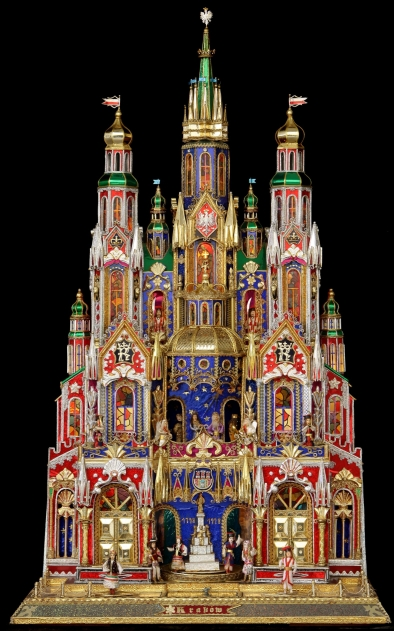
- Kraków szopka by Bronisław Pięcik at the Krzysztofory Museum, Kraków Main Square
- Country: Poland
- Domains: Architecture, Effigies, Religious practice
- Reference: 1362
- Region: Europe and North America

Inscription history
- Inscription: 2018 (13 session)
- List: Representative

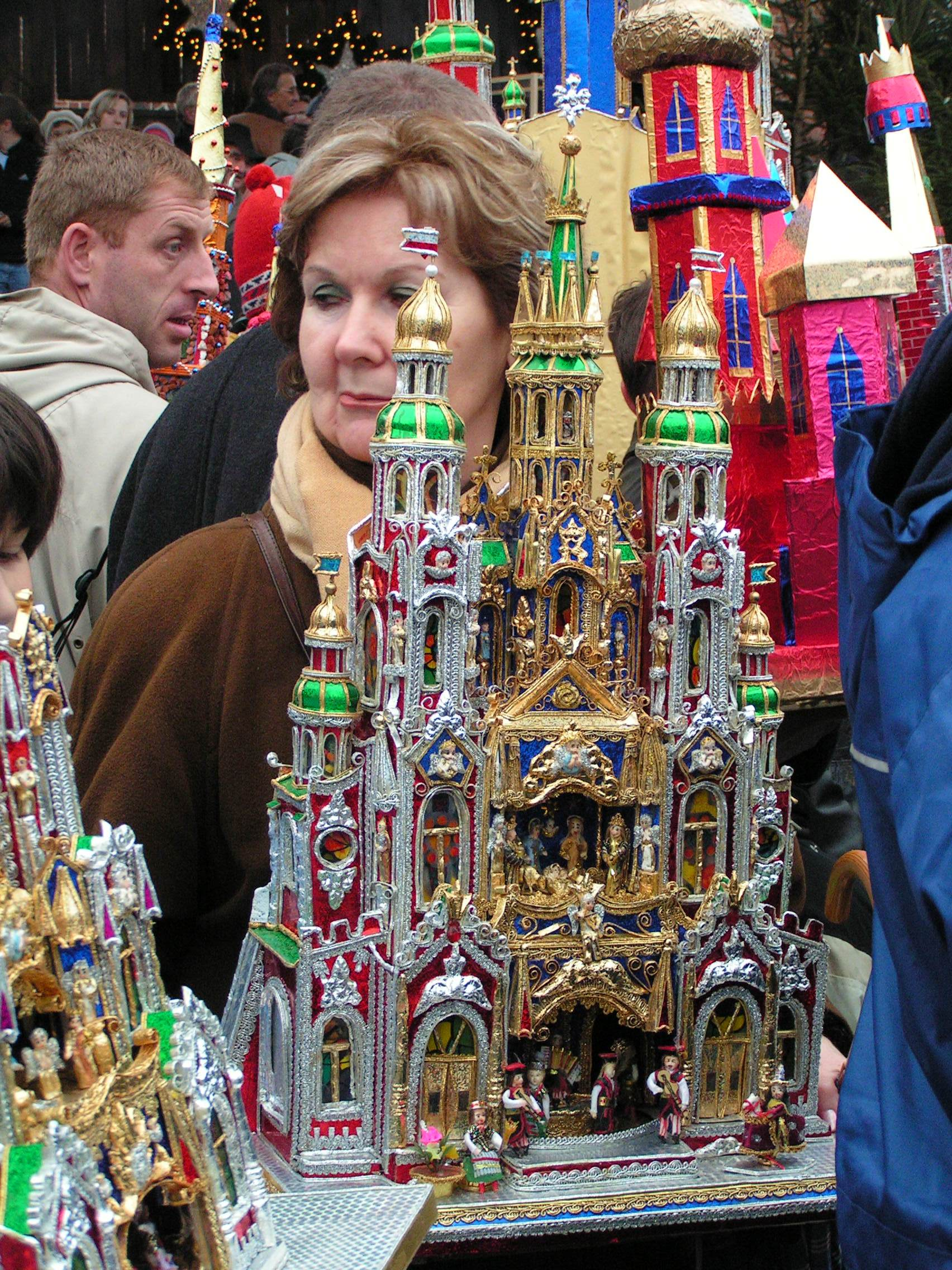
Kraków szopka during a tournament

Kraków szopki [ˈkrakuf ˈʂɔp.ki] or nativity scenes (crib, crèche) (Polish: szopka krakowska) are a Christmas tradition originating from Kraków, Poland, and dating back to the 19th century. An unusual and characteristic feature of the szopka is the use of historical buildings of Kraków as a backdrop for the Nativity of Jesus. In 2018, it was inscribed on the list of UNESCO Intangible Cultural Heritage of Humanity.

== History ==
Nativity scenes, common in Christian cultures, originated with Saint Francis of Assisi in the 13th century and quickly spread to Poland. During the Middle Ages a specific type of nativity-based play, referred to as Jasełka, developed in Poland.

Some performers displayed their szopkas together with puppets in a form of street theatre. In some, movable puppets were replaced with immobile wooden figurines. At times subject-specific puppets or figurines were added to illustrate elements of Polish culture, ranging from historical figures like the winged hussars and Tadeusz Kościuszko, the legendary sorcerer Pan Twardowski and the Dragon of Wawel, to contemporary politicians and artists. In the 18th century the spread of such non-religious content led to a ban on more extravagant nativity scenes in some Polish churches; following the ban, the performances evolved into a true expression of folk art.

The szopka tradition dates back to the 19th century, when Kraków's craftsmen – masons, woodworkers – began to make them as a seasonal decoration in order to earn extra income during the winter. The custom grew in popularity, with people willing to pay to see szopka collections – often carried by door-to-door carollers – or to own them. Among the notable early patrons of the custom was the magnate family of Potoccy.

After Poland regained independence in 1918, szopkas started to be made and sold as souvenirs of Kraków. The city's municipal authorities decided to support this tradition by announcing the first competition in December 1937. Since then, except for the duration of the Second World War, the szopka presentation and tournament has taken place every year on the first Thursday of December, at the Main Market Square, Kraków, next to the Adam Mickiewicz Monument. The best szopkas are then displayed in the Historical Museum of Kraków in Krzysztofory Palace.

== Design ==
The ornate structures can be up to two meters high and three meters wide. The edifice most often used as inspiration for szopka models is St. Mary's Basilica, Kraków with its easily recognizable spires. Other popular choices include Wawel Castle, the Sukiennice trade hall, and the Barbican of Kraków.

Jesus's birth in Bethlehem is often shown on the second floor of the displays, as the first shows historical figures.
