= You Love Me (EP) =

EP by Meat Puppets
- Released: 1999
- Genre: Alternative rock
- Length: 30:39
- Label: London Records

Meat Puppets chronology
Live in Montana (1999)	You Love Me (1999)	Golden Lies (2000)

Professional ratings
Review scores
Source	Rating
AllMusic	3.5/5 stars

You Love Me is a 1999 EP by the Meat Puppets. This was the first release from the then new line-up of the Meat Puppets. It was available free only through the official Meat Puppets website to promote the band's new line-up. The EP became a sought-after collectable.

"Armed and Stupid" and the title track were re-released on the 2000 album Golden Lies.

== Critical reception ==
Trouser Press wrote: "The self-production, nearly identical to [Paul] Leary’s, partially buries the careening lead guitar fills, leaving the rhythm section as the base. Vocals on 'Been Caught Itchin" and 'Monkey Dance' are reminiscent of early releases, while the latter borrows a rhythm figure from Nirvana’s 'Stain.' The excellent ballad 'Diaper' is otherwise unavailable."

== Track listing ==
All songs written by Curt Kirkwood.

1. "You Love Me" - 3:56
2. "Vegetable’s Opinion" - 4:45
3. "Armed & Stupid" - 3:23
4. "Monkey Dance" - 3:34
5. "Been Caught Itchin’" - 3:31
6. "God’s Holy Angels" - 6:26
7. "Diaper" - 5:04

== Personnel ==
- Andrew Duplantis - bass
- Curt Kirkwood - guitar, vocals
- Kyle Ellison - guitar
- Shandon Sahm - drums
