= Forbidden Places =

Studio album by Meat Puppets
- Released: July 1, 1991
- Recorded: 1990–1991
- Studio: Capitol, Hollywood, California
- Genre: Alternative rock
- Length: 37:00
- Label: London
- Producer: Pete Anderson

Meat Puppets chronology
No Strings Attached (1990)	Forbidden Places (1991)	Too High to Die (1994)

Singles from Forbidden Places
- 1. "Sam" Released: 1991; 2. "Whirlpool" Released: 1991

Forbidden Places is the seventh studio album by the American rock band Meat Puppets, released on July 1, 1991, by London Records.

== Background and music ==
Opening with what Greg Prato described as "razor-sharp rock" on "Sam", Forbidden Places explored several styles including blues on "Nail it Down" and country on "Six Gallon Pie" and "That's How It Goes".

== Reception ==
Professional ratings
Review scores
Source	Rating
AllMusic	4/5 stars
Chicago Tribune	3.5/4 stars
Christgau's Consumer Guide	(choice cut)
The Encyclopedia of Popular Music	3/5 stars
Entertainment Weekly	A+
Los Angeles Times	2.5/4 stars
Spin Alternative Record Guide	8/10

AllMusic's Greg Prato proclaimed Forbidden Places to be "one of [the band's] finest albums", complementing the album's more country-informed tracks as "splendidly" showing off the Meat Puppets' "cowboy roots".

In August 1991, Greg Kot of the Chicago Tribune praised Forbidden Places, awarding it three and a half-of-four stars and writing that the band's "casual brilliance becomes more dazzling with each play".

== Track listing ==
All songs written by Curt Kirkwood.

1. "Sam" – 3:05
2. "Nail It Down" – 3:32
3. "This Day" – 3:14
4. "Open Wide" – 3:11
5. "Another Moon" – 3:39
6. "That's How It Goes" – 3:24
7. "Whirlpool" – 3:31
8. "Popskull" – 3:05
9. "No Longer Gone" – 3:56
10. "Forbidden Places" – 2:59
11. "Six Gallon Pie" – 3:24

== Personnel ==
Meat Puppets

- Curt Kirkwood - guitar, vocals, cover
- Cris Kirkwood - bass, backing vocals, illustration
- Derrick Bostrom - drums, percussion

with:

- Skip Edwards - organ on "Nail It Down" and "Another Moon", piano on "That's How It Goes"
- Alex Acuña - percussion on "Another Moon", "Whirlpool" and "No Longer Gone"
- Tommy Funderburk - backing vocals on "Nail It Down"
- Peter Doell - additional backing vocals on "No Longer Gone"
