= Culture of Kraków =

Kraków is considered by many to be the cultural capital of Poland. It was named the European Capital of Culture by the European Union for the year 2000. The city has some of the best museums in the country and several famous theaters. It became the residence of two Polish Nobel laureates in literature: Wisława Szymborska and Czesław Miłosz, while a third Nobel laureate, the Yugoslav writer Ivo Andrić also lived and studied in Krakow. It is also home to one of the world's oldest universities, the Jagiellonian University of Kraków, and Jan Matejko Academy of Fine Arts, the oldest Polish fine art academy, established in 1818 and granted full autonomy in 1873.

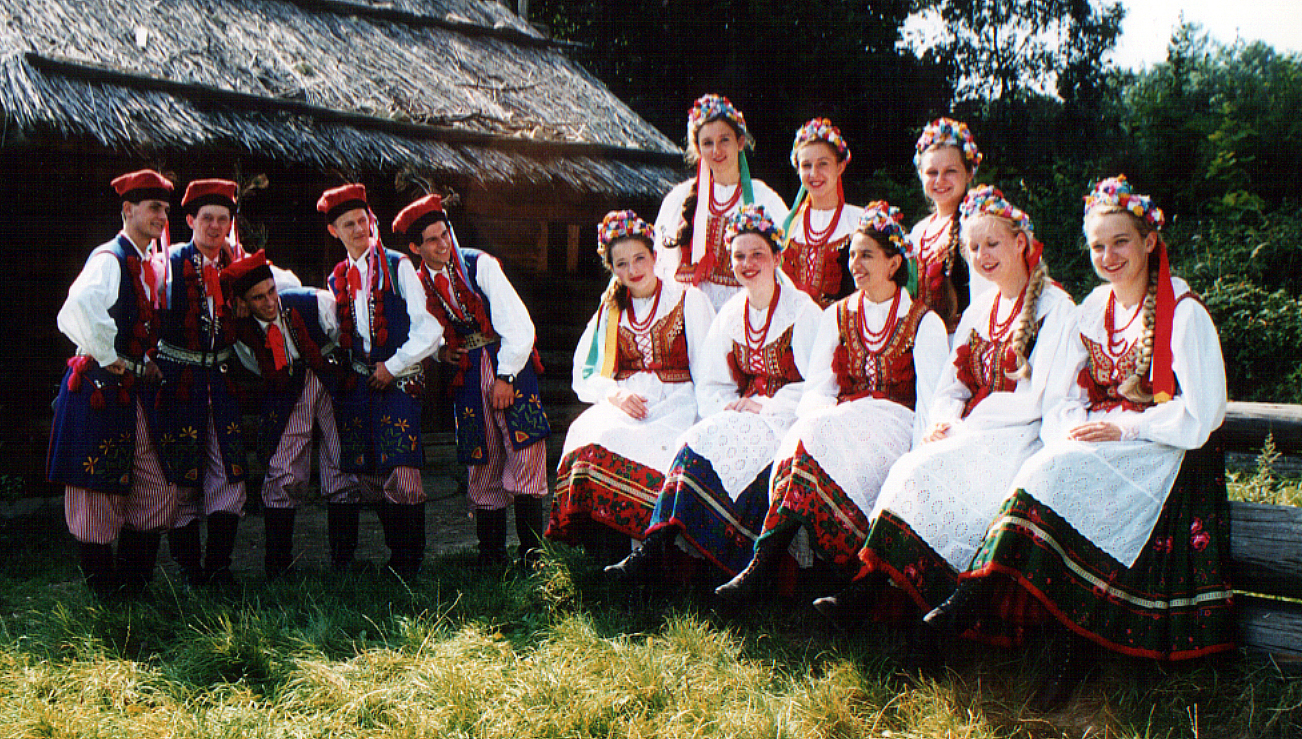
Folk dancers in traditional costumes from Kraków (regarded as Polish national costumes)

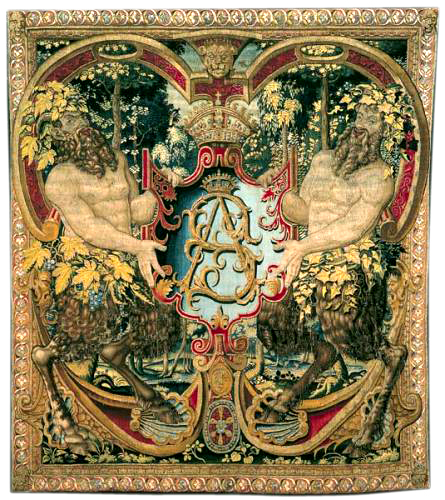
Wawel Tapestry

== Museums and national art galleries ==
Kraków has 28 museums as well as a number of art collections and public art galleries. They are separated into the National and City museums:

The National Museum established in 1879, which is the main branch of Poland's National Museum with permanent collections around the country, as well as the National Art Collection on Wawel Hill and the Czartoryski Museum featuring works by Leonardo and Rembrandt.

- Wawel Castle National Art Collection is located at Wawel, the former residence of three dynasties of Polish monarchs. Royal Chambers feature art, period furniture, Polish and European paintings, collectibles, and an unsurpassed display of the 16th-century monumental Flemish tapestries. Wawel Treasury and Armory features Polish royal memorabilia, jewels, applied art, and 15th to 18th-century arms. The Wawel Eastern Collection features Turkish tents and military accessories.
- Kraków National Museum with multiple branches in downtown Kraków, is the richest museum in the country with collections consisting of several hundred thousand items kept in big part in the Main Building but also in the nine of its divisions:
  - The Main Building (at 3 Maja St) serves as the chief venue for temporary exhibitions. The gallery of the 20th century Polish art (upstairs) houses nearly 500 works by Polish modern artists.
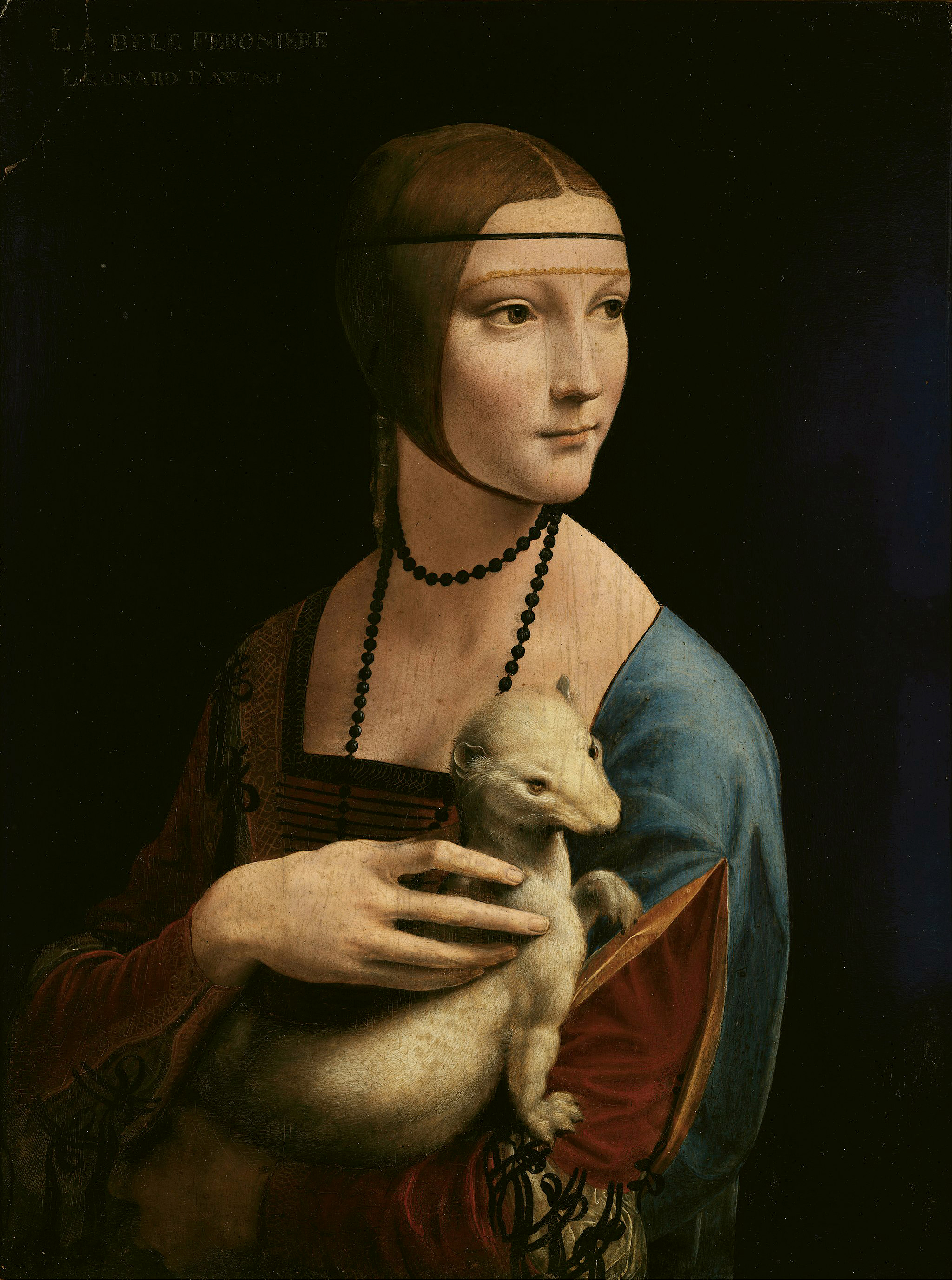
    Lady with an Ermine, by Leonardo da Vinci
  - Czartoryski Museum and Arsenal (at Św. Jana 19), world-famous for Leonardo's painting of Lady with an Ermine. The museum has other old masters on display including a dramatic landscape by Rembrandt.
  - Manggha Museum of Japanese Art and Technology (at M. Konopnickiej 26)
  - Stanisław Wyspiański Museum (at 11 Szczepanska St)
  - The Gallery of 19th Century Polish Art in Sukiennice, with the collection of some of the best known paintings and sculptures of the Young Poland movement.
  - Jan Matejko Manor
  - Emeryk Hutten-Czapski Museum
  - Józef Mehoffer Manor

The City of Krakow has a Museum of Krakow that also has branches throughout the city:-

- Kraków Museum of History
  Divisions:
  - The Main Building (at Main Market Square, Rynek Główny 35), devoted to the history of the city and its citizens with collections of maps, documents and city stamps, scepters and rings of Lord Mayors, guild objects, portraits of nobility, and the Kraków's famous Christmas cribs.
  - Town Hall Tower
  - Barbican
  - Krzysztofory Palace
  - Szołayski Museum
  - The Silesian House also known as Pomorska Museum
  - History of theatre in Krakow museum
  - Jewish Museum at the Old Synagogue
  - Hipolit Manor
  - Celestat, the Residence of the Sharpshooters' Society
  - Artistic Salon of the District of Zwierzyniec
  - Museum of National Remembrance at "Under the Eagle Pharmacy"
  - History of Nowa Huta Museum

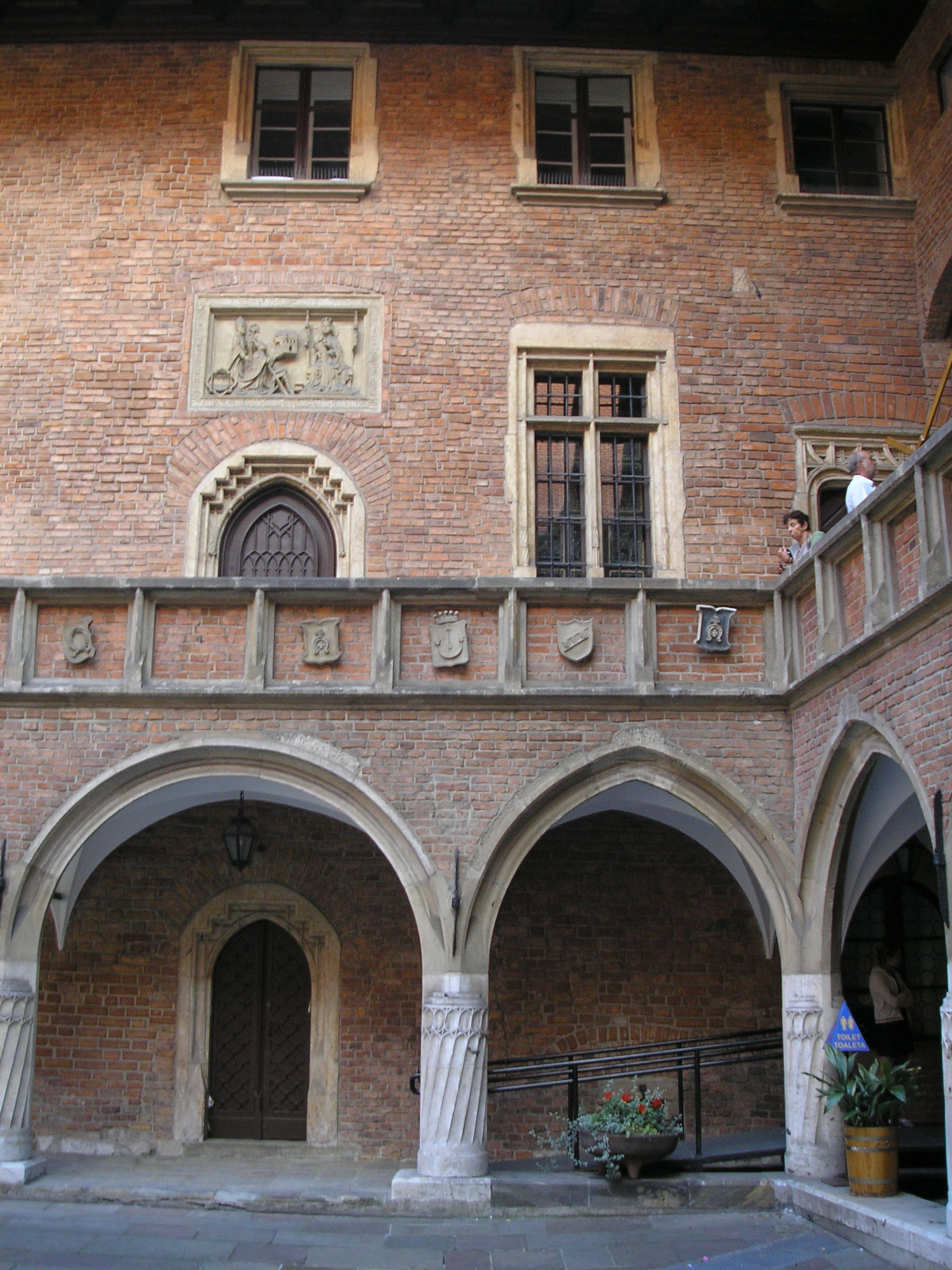
Collegium Maius

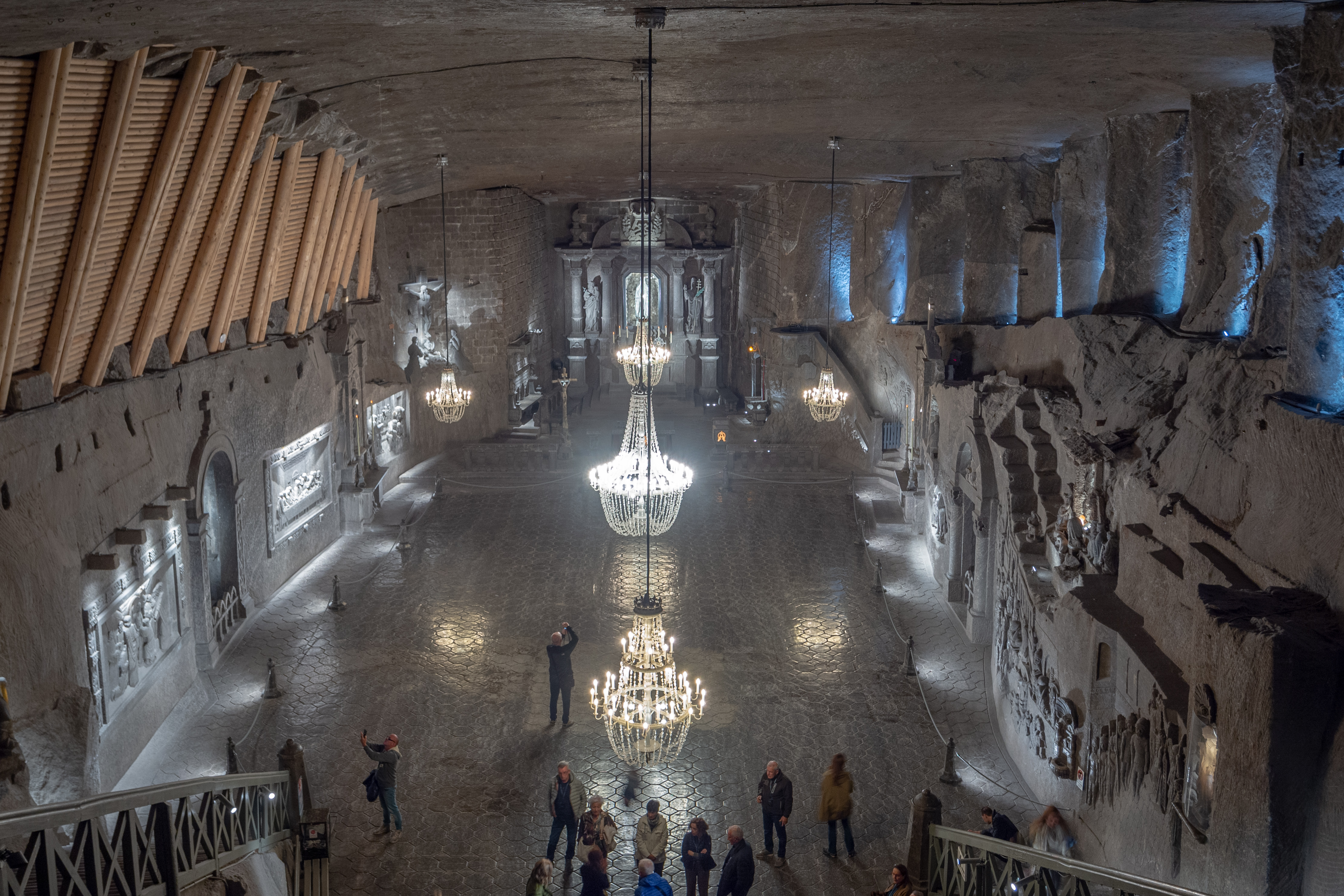
Salt Mine in Wieliczka

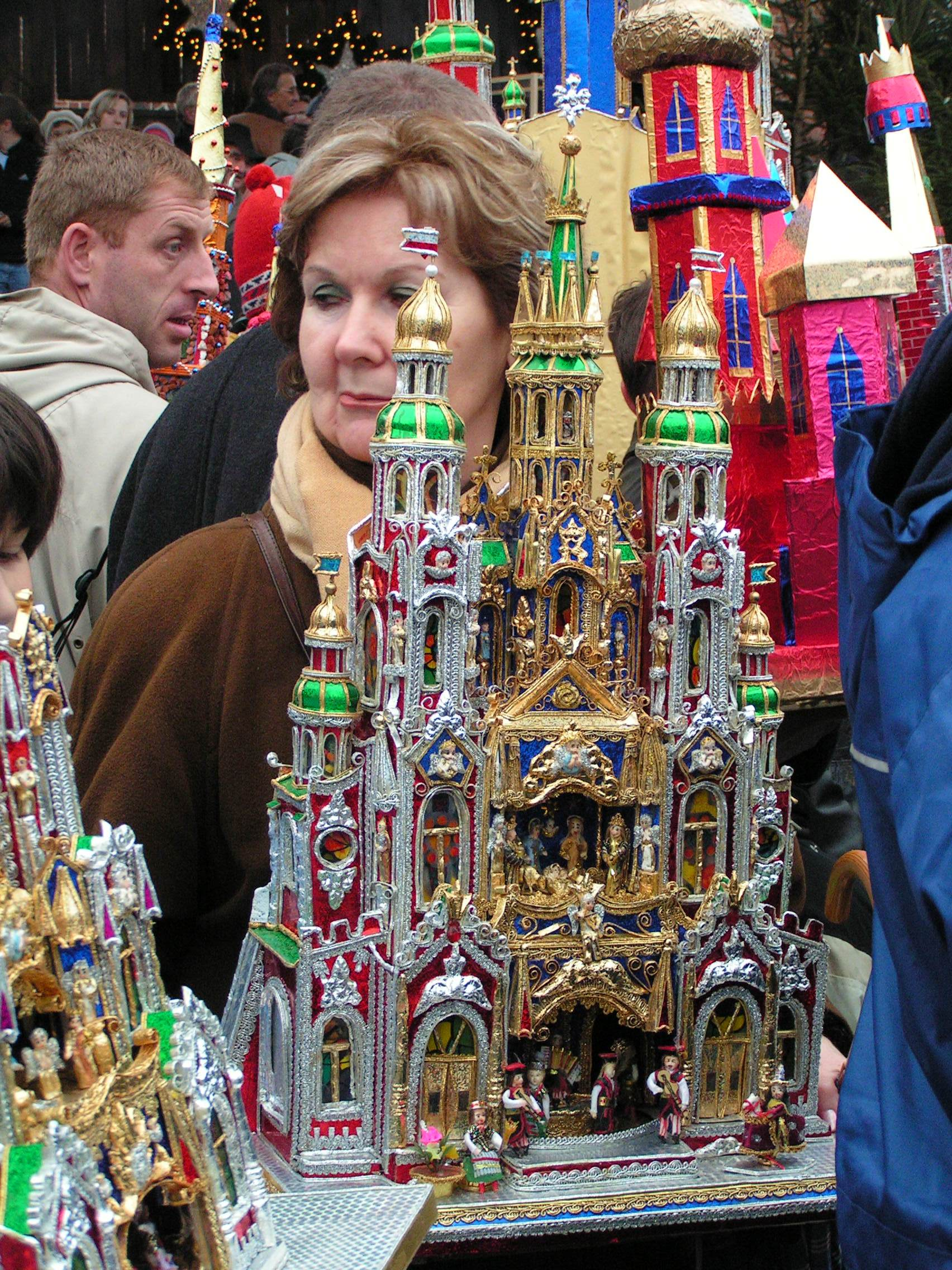
Nativity Cribs Festival

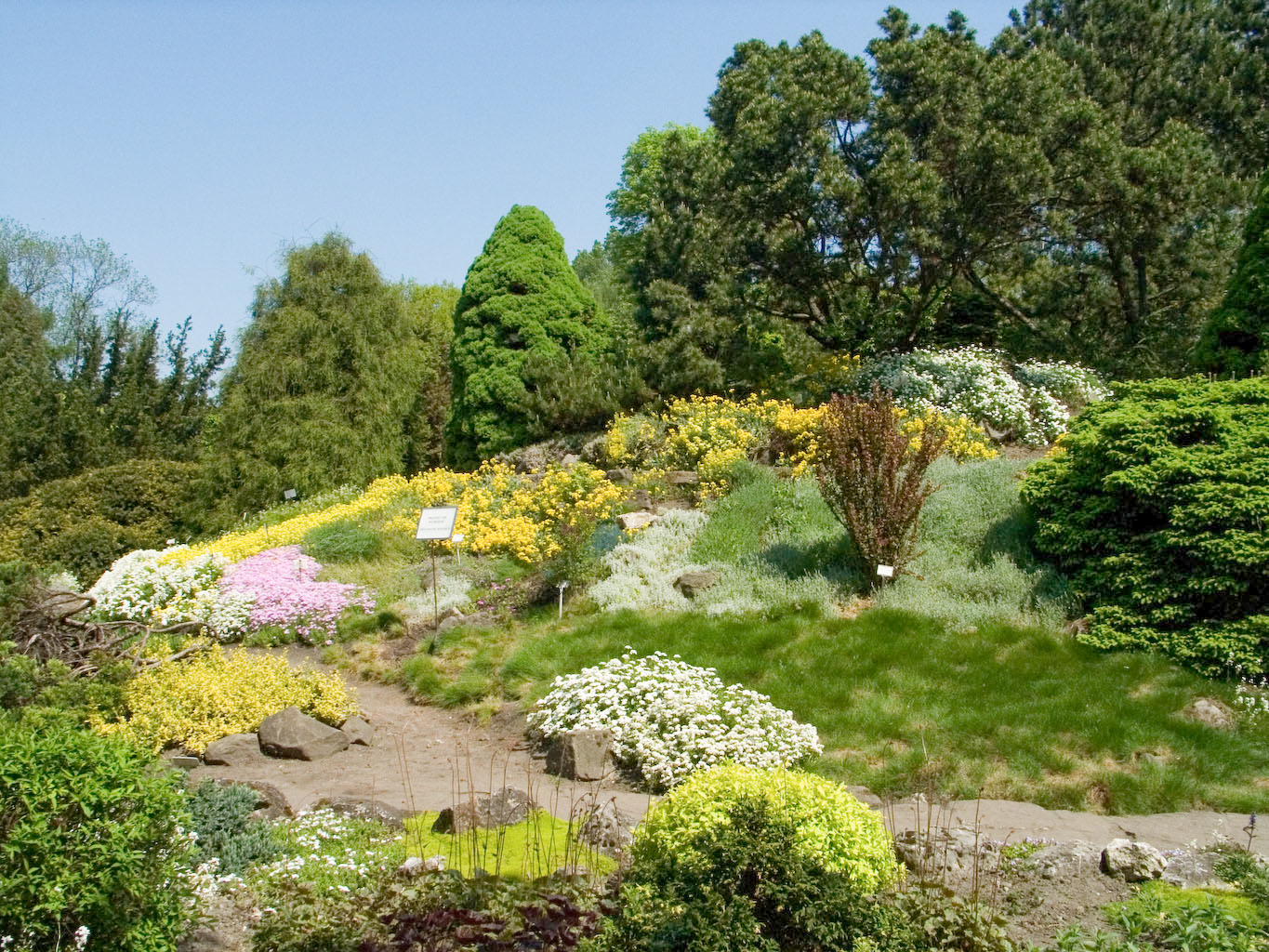
Botanical Garden in Kraków

- Collegium Maius Museum of the Jagiellonian University. The 15th-century Collegium Maius is the oldest building of the Jagiellonian University featuring ancient lecture rooms, communal halls, former professors' quarters, library and treasury with the Gothic sceptres of rectors and the golden 'Jagiellonian globe'. The exhibits include medieval science instruments, old globes, paintings, collectibles, furniture, coins and medals. (See also: Collegium Novum)
- Wieliczka Salt Mine, in continuous operation since the 13th century
- Cathedral Museum
- Museum of Archaeology
- Polish Aviation Museum
- Archdiocesean Museum
- Museum of Independence
- Armed Effort Museum (by appointment only)
- Museum of Ethnography
- Museum of Pharmacy of the Jagiellonian University
- Museum of Geology of the Polish Academy of Sciences
- Czartoryski Library
- Museum of the Home Army (AK)
- Museum of Photography
- Museum of Natural History
- Museum of Zoology
- Rydlówka Manor: museum of the Young Poland movement
- The Cricoteka Centre for Documentation of Tadeusz Kantor Art
- Museum of Urban Engineering a.k.a. Transportation Museum
- Galicia Jewish Museum
- Muzeum Katedry i Zakładu Anatomii UJ CM
- Palace of Art (See also: The Kraków Society of Friends of Fine Arts)

== Festivals ==
Kraków is home to many different and unique street festivals, parties and parades. Most famous are its Nativity Cribs Festival held every December, the Jewish Culture Festival held at the end of June, International Jazz Festival held in April, Lajkonik Parade during the spring, and a number of indoor festivals held throughout the year. The extended list of Kraków festivals includes:

- International Jazz Festival (April)
- International Film Festival (May)
- Equality March in Kraków (May)
- Juwenalia Student Festival (May)
- Lajkonik Parade (June)
- Enthronement of the Cock King (June)
- Wreaths (Wianki) Midsummer Festival (June 24)
- Summer in Krakow Festivals (June, July)
  - Summer Jazz Festival
  - Jewish Culture Festival (June 25 - July 3)
  - Krakow Summer Animation Days (July)
  - Festival of Military Bands
  - Street Theater Festival
  - Music in Old Krakow
  - Krakow Jazz Festival
- International Summer Festival of Organ Music (July - August)
- Folk Art Fair (August)
- International Competition of Contemporary Chamber Music
  (September 16–29)
- Organ Music Festival (October)
- Unsound Festival, electronic and alternative music (October)
- International Film Festival Etiuda&Anima, international film festival (November)
- Zaduszki Jazz Festival (November)
- Festival of Animated Film
- Christmas Market ('till December 26)
- Kraków szopka Nativity Cribs Festival (first Thursday of December)
- New Year's Party at the Main Square (December 31)

== Theatres ==
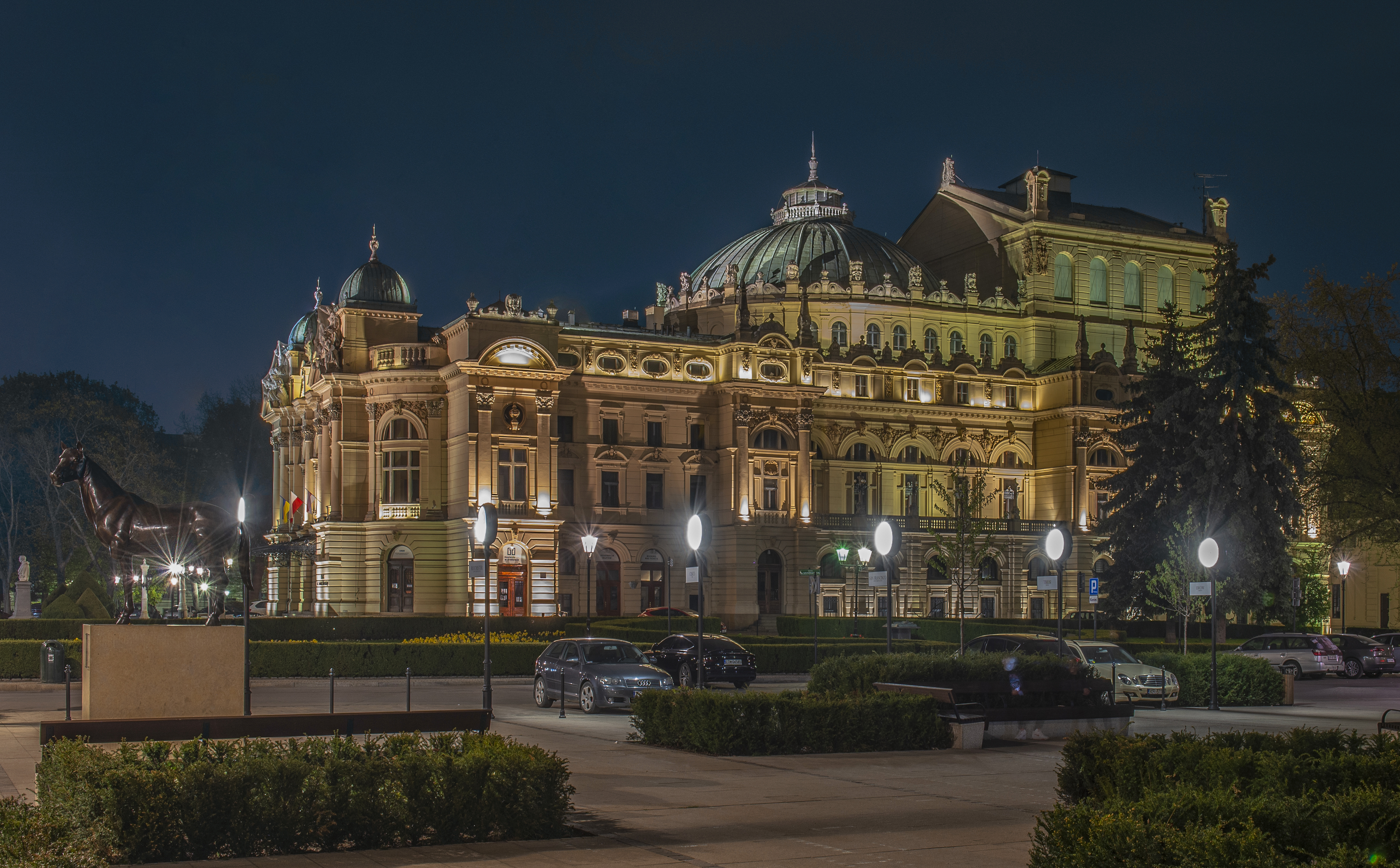
Slowacki Theatre in Krakow Old Town District

Kraków is home to one of nation's most active theatre scenes and some of the oldest continuing performing arts companies. It is considered to be the second largest centre for Polish theatre behind Warsaw. It is home to both acclaimed productions by companies such as the National Stary Theatre, and the emerging companies supporting new generation of local artists. Among established theatres in Kraków with permanent stages often in buildings of historic significance are:

- National Stary Theatre, a.k.a. The Old Theatre, at 1 Jagielonska St.
- Juliusz Słowacki Theatre, at 1 Sw. Ducha Square
- Bagatela Theatre, at 6 Karmelicka St.
- The Ludowy Theatre, a.k.a. The People's Theatre, at os. Teatralne in District Nowa Huta
- Groteska Theatre of Puppetry, at 2 Skarbowa St.
- Łaźnia Nowa Theatre in Nowa Huta
- The Krakow VARIETE Theatre

== Music ==
Opera Krakowska one of the leading national opera companies, stages 200 performances each year including ballet, operettas and musicals. It has, in its main repertoire, the greatest world and Polish opera classics. The Opera moved into its first permanent House in the autumn of 2008. It is in charge also of the Summer Festival of Opera and Operetta.

Cracow is home to two major Polish festivals of early music presenting forgotten Baroque oratorios and operas: Opera Rara and Misteria Paschalia. Meanwhile, Capella Cracoviensis runs the Music in Old Cracow International Festival.

Academy of Music in Kraków, founded in 1888, is known world-wide as the alma mater of the contemporary Polish composer Krzysztof Penderecki, and it is also the only one in Poland to have two winners of the International Chopin Competition in Warsaw among its alumni. The Academy organizes concerts of its students and guests throughout the whole year.

Music organizations and venues include: Kraków Philharmonic, home of the Kraków Philharmonic Orchestra as well as the chamber Capella Cracoviensis, Sinfonietta Cracovia (a.k.a. the Orchestra of the Royal City of Kraków), the Polish Radio Choir of Kraków, Organum Academic Choir, the Mixed Mariański Choir (Mieszany Chór Mariański), Krakow Academic Choir of the Jagiellonian University, the Krakow Chamber Choir, Amar Corde String Quartet, Consortium Iagellonicum Baroque Orchestra of the Jagiellonian University, the Brass Band of T. Sendzimir Steelworks, and Camerata Chamber Orchestra of Radio Kraków.

== Cultural centres ==
The City of Kraków is the largest public funder of the community arts initiatives among the city districts. Many neighborhoods in Kraków operate publicly sponsored cultural centres with the financial aid from the cultural department of the municipal government. Community centres with their many exhibitions, art classes, educational and music programs are perhaps the most noticeable cultural venues at a local level. They are paid for from the 4% of the budget of the city of Kraków (with revenue of 2,150 million złoty in 2006) allocated to culture and recreational facilities. Among the city's cultural centres are:

- Nowa Huta Cultural Centre, at Aleja Jana Pawła II 232
- International Centre of Culture, at Rynek Główny 25
- Old-Town Staromiejskie Cultural Centre for Youth, at ul. H. Wietora 13/15
- Białoprądnicki Manor Cultural Centre, at ul. Papiernicza 2
- Catholic Centre, at ul. Wiślna 12
- Rotunda Cultural Centre, at ul. Oleandry 1
- Jewish Cultural Centre, at ul. Meiselsa 17
- Teranga Centre of African Culture and Art, at ul. Kalwaryjska 48
- Kurdwanów Nowy Cultural Centre, at ul. Witosa 39

== Nightlife ==
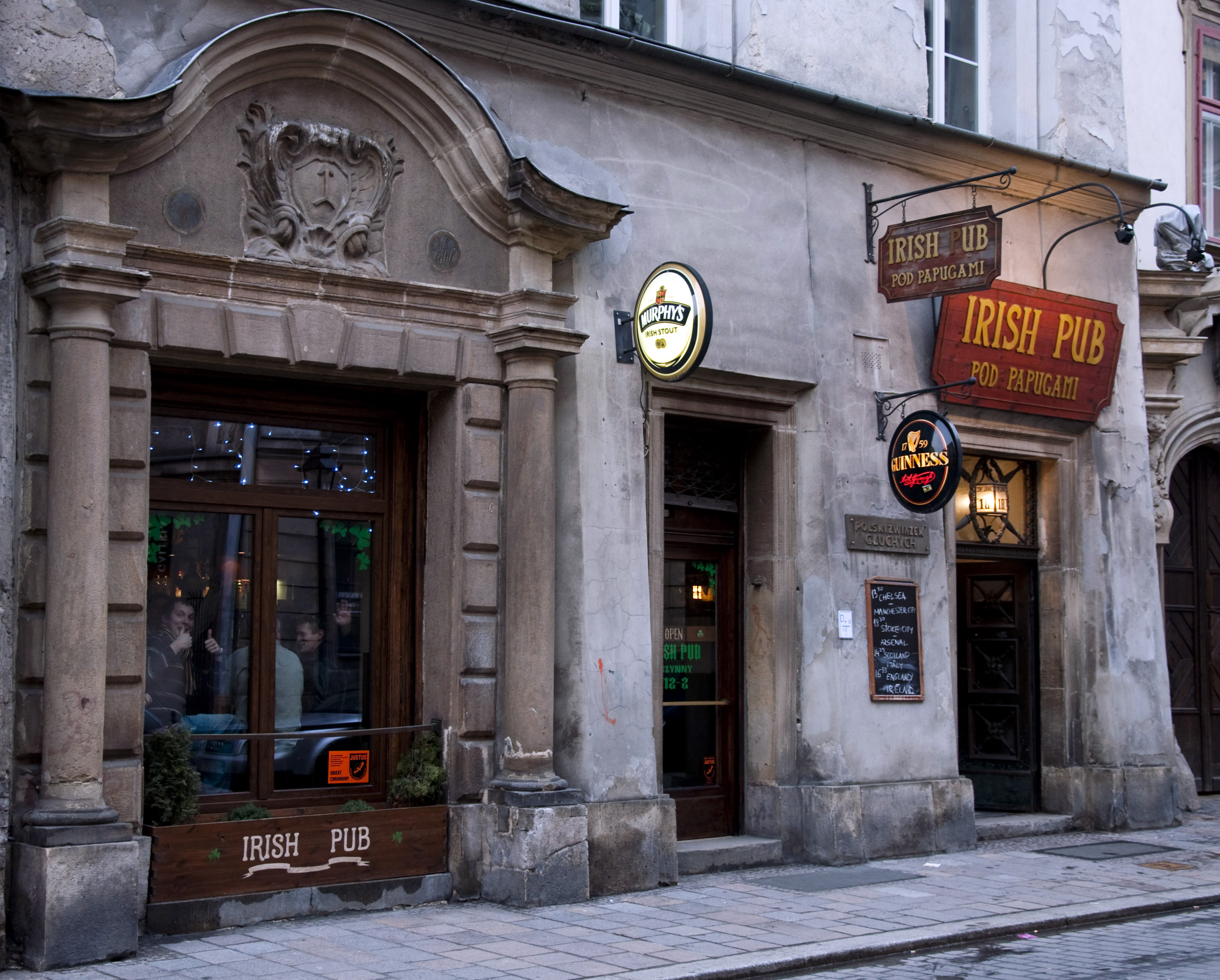
Irish Pub "Pod Papugami"

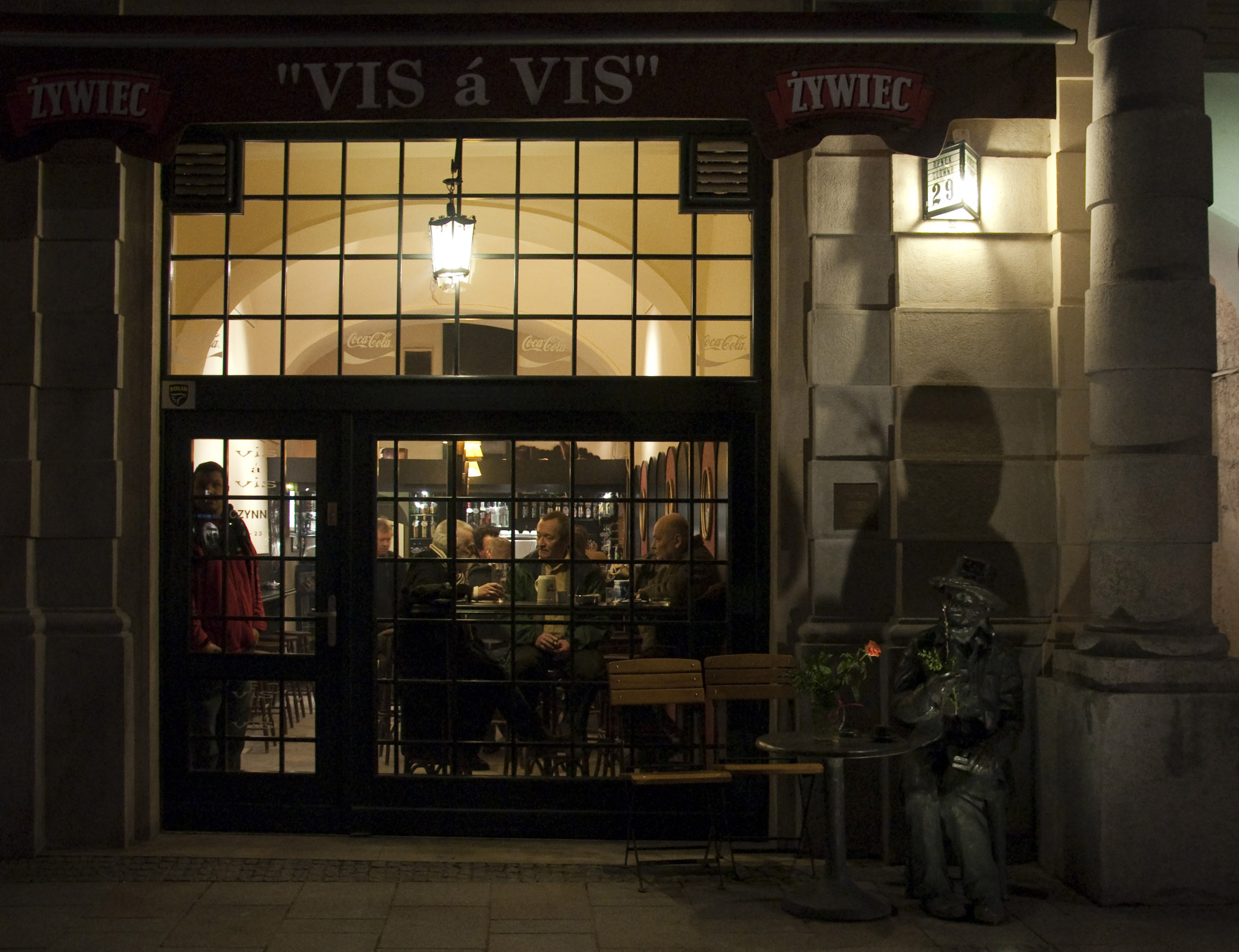
Famous bar "Vis-à-Vis" on Main Market Square

There are over a hundred pubs and bars in the vicinity of the Kraków Market Square alone, most in the cellars of historic buildings, each with its own intimate character and atmosphere. Many of the establishments are devoted to live music as well. Jazz clubs include: Harris Piano Jazz Bar, Jazz Club U Muniaka, Pod Jaszczurami Club, Kornet Jazz Club, U Louisa, and Piec Art Club. Popular places to drink, eat, and enjoy, are situated also in the nearby Kazimierz quarter. The main square is home to a melange of bars and shops where the hundreds of different Polish Vodkas can be tried out.

Friday and Saturday nights are the high points of the entertainment week. Live entertainment fits all tastes. Jazz remains very popular and there is no lack of places for fans of rock, modern pop, ballads, including classical music. A number of restaurants in the centre of Kraków can seat more than 100.

Among Jazz musicians with bands are: Reiner Trio, Beale Street Band, Boba Jazz Band, Aleksander Glondys Quartet/Quintet (formerly: Al’Mad), Jazz Band Ball Orchestra, Janusz Witko Quartet, Mr. Bober's Friends, Cracow Swing Quartet, Old Metropolitan Band, Marek Bałata Jazz Singer, Andrzej Cudzich, New Bone, Sebastian Bernatowicz, Jan Pilch, Karolina Styła, Overtime, Piotr Domagała, Ryszard Styła, Jorgos Skolias.

Kraków Klezmer groups include: Kroke and The Cracow Klezmer Band.

Selected Folk bands: Krakowiacy Song and Dance Company, Students Highlanders' Ensemble "Skalni", Retro-Circus-Folk Band "Vladimirska", Nowa Huta Song and Dance Ensemble, Highland Folk Group Hamernik, Children's Highland Folk Group Mali Hamernicy and Folk Dance Group Krakowiak.

== See also ==
- Events in Krakow
- Lesser Polish Way
