= Rybarski =

Rybarski (feminine: Rybarska) is a Polish surname. Notable people with the surname include:

- Jan Rybarski (born 1941), conductor and organist
- Roman Rybarski (1887–1942), Polish economist and politician
