= Museum of Nowa Huta =

- Established: 2005
- Location: Kraków, Poland
- Coordinates: 50.07724°N 20.03930°E
- Type: Local museum
- Manager: Maria Wąchała-Skindzier
- Director: Michał Niezabitowski
- Curator: Maria Wąchała-Skindzier
- Website: muzeumkrakowa.pl/branches/history-nowa-huta-quarter

The Museum of Nowa Huta is a branch of the Historical Museum of Kraków. This department was opened on 26 April 2005 by the Mayor of Kraków, Jacek Majchrowski. It contains temporary exhibitions related to the history and monuments of Nowa Huta, the youngest district of Kraków. This branch arranges lessons, lectures and organizes academic conferences related to this district. The museum is located on the ground floor in a 4-floor apartment building. The scouts' supply depot has been adapted to the needs of this branch and a modern audio-visual and exhibition room has been created.
