= Krzysztofory Palace Museum =

Museum in Kraków, Poland

Kraków Museum Krzysztofory Palace
- Muzeum Krakowa - Pałac Krzysztofory
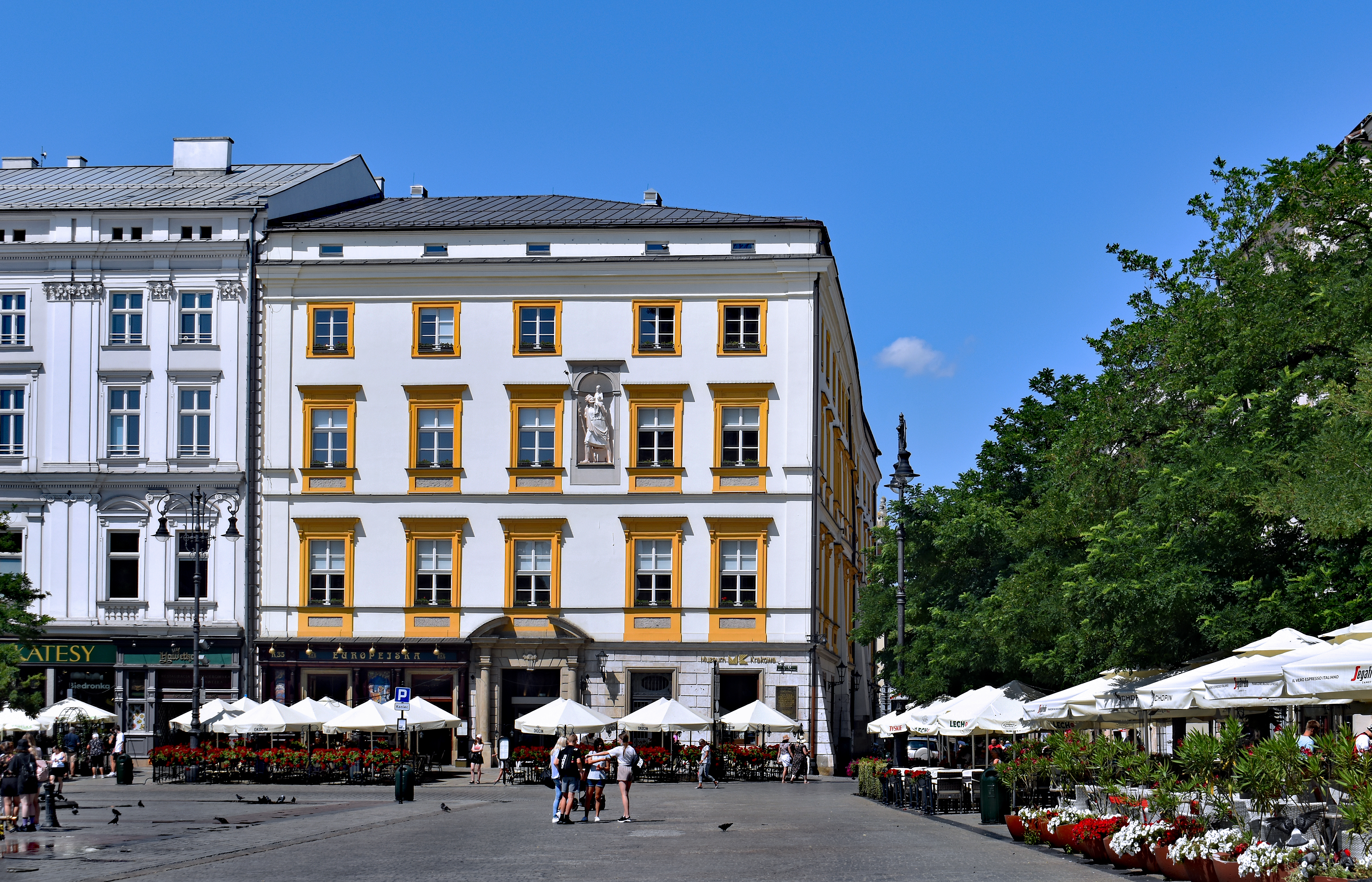
- Headquarters of the Historical Museum of Kraków
- Established: 1899
- Location: 35 Main Market Square; Kraków; Poland
- Coordinates: 50°03′46″N 19°56′11.5″E
- Type: City Museum
- Manager: Piotr Hapanowicz
- Director: Michał Niezabitowski
- Curator: Piotr Hapanowicz
- Website: muzeumkrakowa.pl/en/branches/krzysztofory-palace

The Krzysztofory Palace is the headquarters of Muzeum Krakowa, being transferred to the jurisdiction of this institution in 1965. The current exhibition at Krzysztofory Palace is "Krakow from the beginning, to no end". As the name suggests, it presents the whole history of Krakow from its beginnings in the prehistoric mythical King Krakus to the modern times, having the final piece of the exhibition always being changed according to the events in Krakow.

This exhibition includes many iconic pieces connected to Krakow, such as the Lajkonik costume, the traditional Krakow nativity scenes (including a life-size scaled version), mascarons; those particularly related to local institutions, such as the silver rooster of the Fowler Brotherhood from the 16th century, the ring and scepter of Krakow mayors from the same century, the counter of the Krakow Merchant Congregation from the 18th century, but also works signed with the names of Jan Matejko, Józef Mehoffer, Zofia Stryjeńska, Jacek Malczewski, Wojciech Weiss and Wlastimil Hoffman.

Besides this exhibition, the historic interiors of the renovated palace include a library and archive, educational, administrative, commercial, gastronomic spaces and a conference hall. Also in these renovated premises there are events like concerts, literary meetings, debates, lessons and educational workshops.

The opening of the “Krakow from the beginning, to no end” exhibition is the last element of the project implemented by the Museum of Krakow “Krzysztofory anew – Complete Museum: modernization and renovation of the Krzysztofory Palace along with adapting its functions to the implementation of the tasks of a modern, multifunctional museum facility”. 85% of the investment (over PLN 29 million) was implemented thanks to the European Funds, namely Priority Axis VIII – Protection of Cultural Heritage and Development of Cultural Resources under the Infrastructure and Environment Operational Programme 2014–2020. The remaining 15% of the investment costs were covered by the Municipality of Krakow.
