= Rynek Underground =

Museum in Kraków, Poland

- Historical Museum of Kraków Rynerk Underground
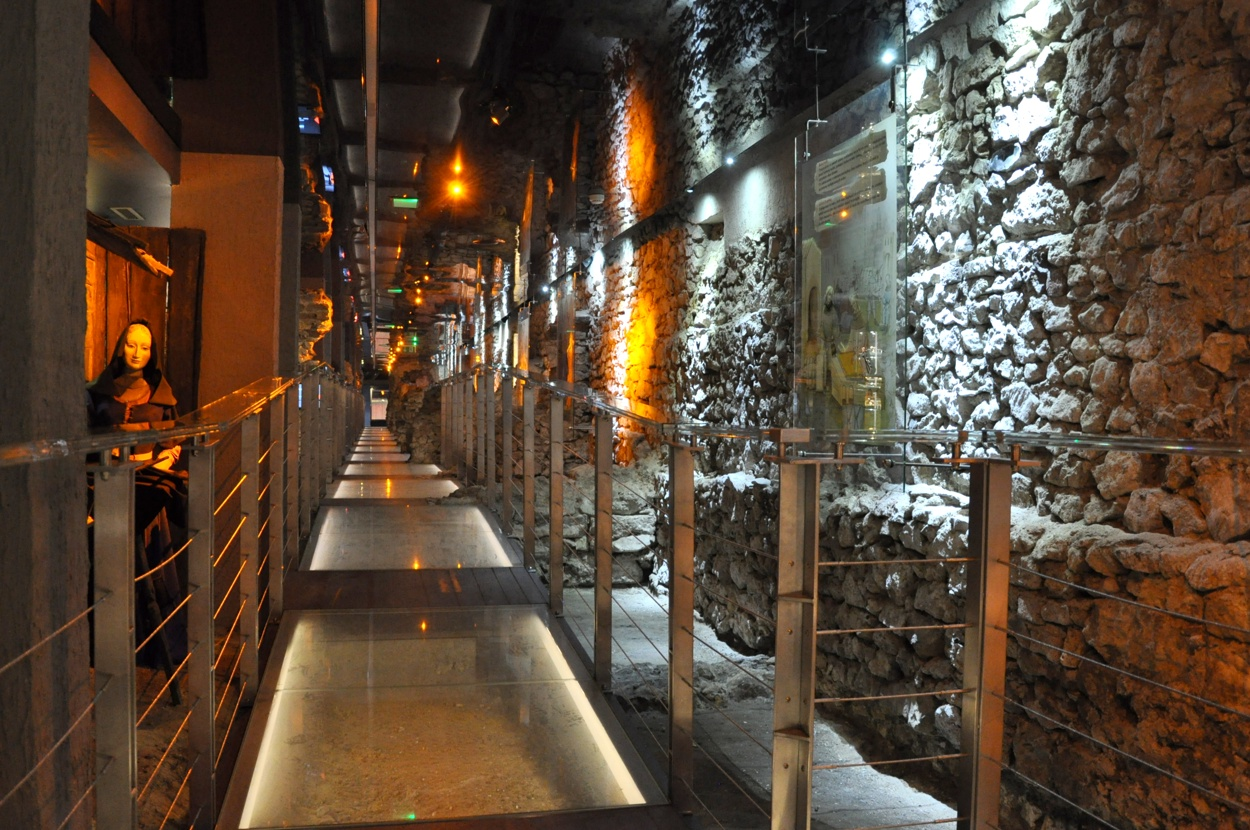
- Branch of Historical Museum of Kraków
- Established: 2010
- Location: Kraków, Poland
- Coordinates: 50.06202°N 19.93776°E
- Type
- Collection size
- Visitors
- Manager: Łukasz Walas
- Director: PL:Michał Niezabitowski
- Curator: Łukasz Walas
- Public transit access: Miejskie Przedsiębiorstwo Komunikacyjne w Krakowie how to get there, see external links
- Website: http://www.mhk.pl/branches/rynek-underground

The Rynek Underground museum of Kraków is situated below the market square of the city. The museum is approximately 4000 square meters in size.

Work on the museum first began in 2009 with a budget of 38 million złotys, equal to approximately 9.3 million United States dollars (2023). The museum was opened on September 24, 2010. The main exhibit "In the Footsteps of Krakow's European Identity" was launched three days after the museum's opening, on September 27, 2010.

== Exhibits ==
The main exhibit, "In the Footsteps of Krakow's European Identity", uses holograms constructed by using projectors, alongside fog machines and screens to recreate the atmosphere of Kraków seven hundred years ago. A 693 kg medieval piece of lead called the "loaf" is displayed along with other items such as everyday historical items, currency, figures and sculptures, games, weapons, and tools. The exhibition also includes a catalog of three-dimensional models of these objects, available via touchscreens.

Adjacent to the multimedia exhibit and underneath the Kraków Cloth Hall lie the medieval tracts viewed underfoot through glass walkways.

This part of the museum includes remains of medieval constructions, including:

- A reconstructed 12th-century workshop
- Former waterworks (aqueducts)
- The remains of burned settlements dating from the eleventh century
- A reconstruction of a medieval merchant's stall
- A map depicting distant trade routes
