= Historical Museum of Kraków =

Museum in Kraków, Poland

Kraków Museum

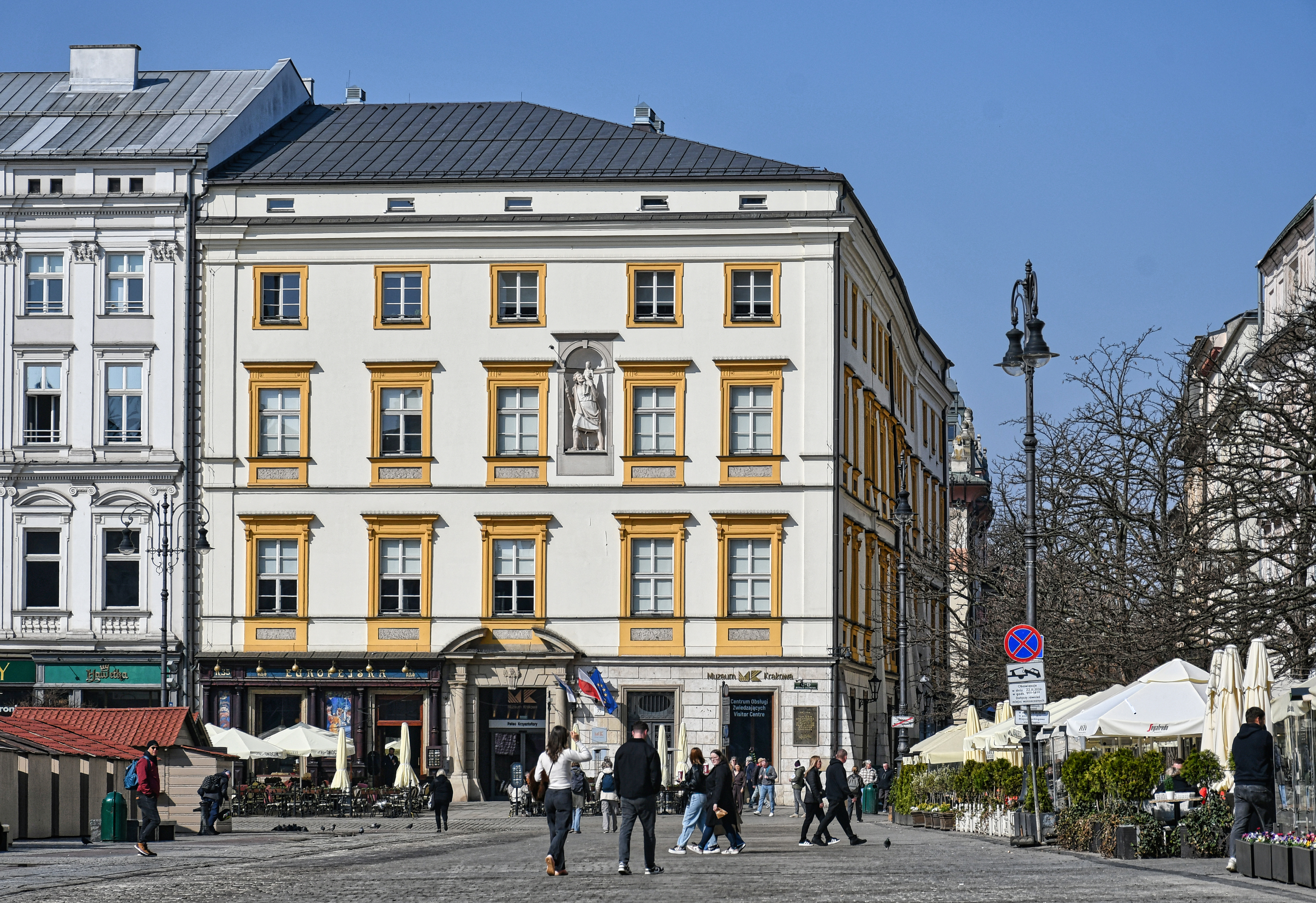
- Krzysztofory Palace at the Main Market Square, Kraków
- Established: 1899
- Location: 35 Main Market Square; Kraków; Poland
- Coordinates: 50°03′46″N 19°56′11.5″E
- Type: National museum
- Manager: Piotr Hapanowicz
- Director: Michał Niezabitowski
- Curator: Piotr Hapanowicz
- Website: https://muzeumkrakowa.pl/en

The Historical Museum of the City of Kraków (Polish: Muzeum Historyczne Miasta Krakowa) in Kraków, Poland, was granted the status of an independent institution in 1945. Originally, it was a branch of the Old Records Office of Kraków, in operation from 1899.

The museum's main location is the baroque Krzysztofory Palace.

== Organization ==
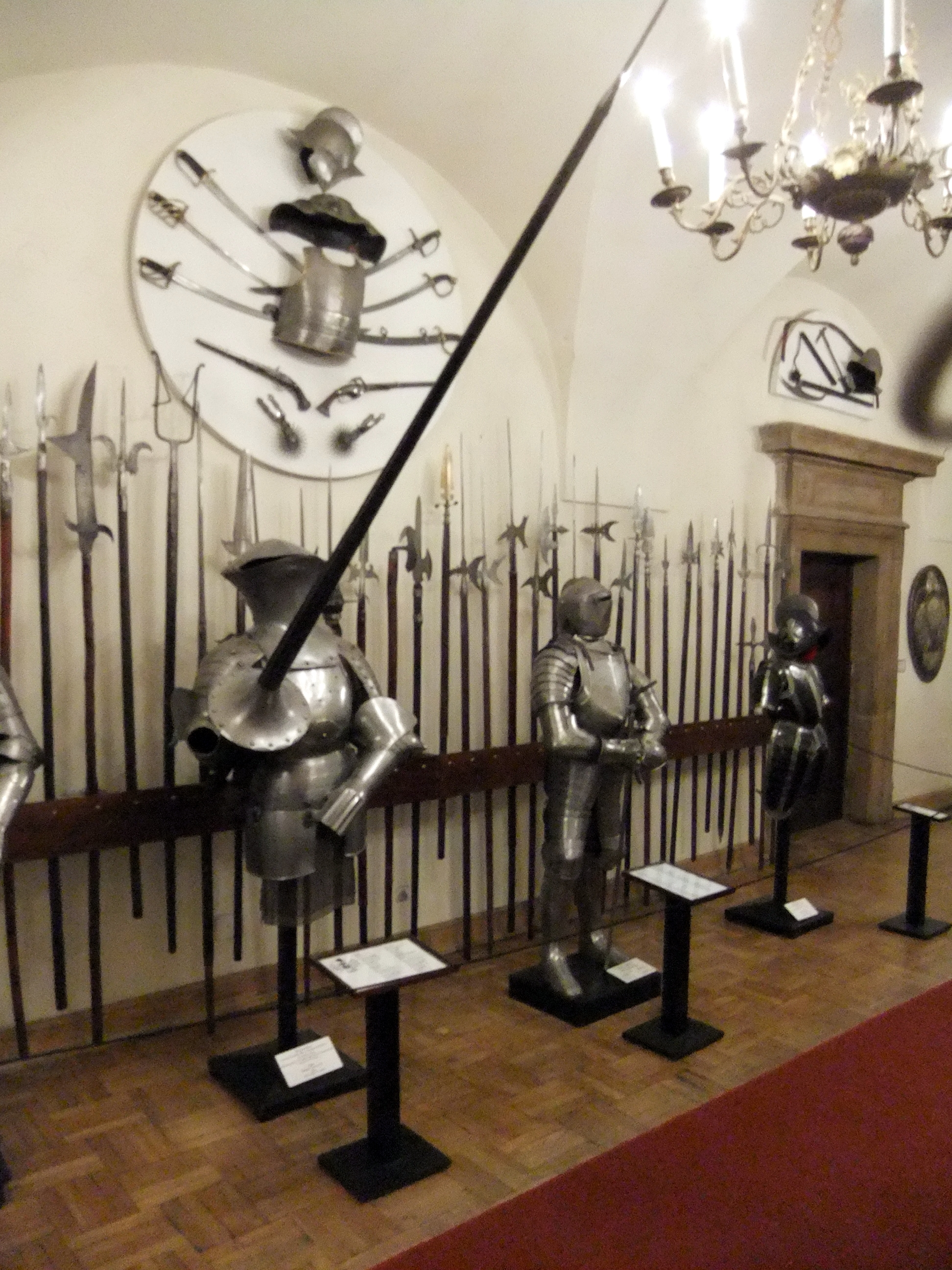
Exhibition inside the museum

The Historical Museum is made up of 14 divisions scattered around the city, including its main branch as well as Old Synagogue, Schindler's Factory, Under the Eagle Pharmacy, Pomorska street Gestapo prison, Hipolit Manor, Town Hall Tower, Barbakan, Defensive Walls, Celestat, Muzeum of Nowa Huta, Zwierzyniecki Manor, Under the Cross Manor, and the Main Market Square tunnels. The divisions preserve and display artifacts of the history of the city, the history of Jews, the history of the theatre and many others.

The museum holdings include sixteenth through twentieth century city maps, paintings, prints, photographs, guild objects and works by Kraków artists and artisans, as well as portraits of nobility from the sixteenth to the twentieth century; fourteenth through twentieth century weapons; a collection of sixteenth through twentieth century clocks; famous Kraków nativity scenes (szopka); artifacts related to theatre; Judaica; items commemorative of the Polish uprisings of the nineteenth century and of World War I and II.

The museum houses a permanent exhibit of the History and Culture of Kraków, a collection of the militaria (projectiles, firearms, defense and sharp weapons), clocks and watches. The Town Hall Tower in the Main Market Square is the venue of the Photographs of the Market Square exhibition.

Since 1999, under the museum's jurisdiction is the Barbakan, one of the best known examples of medieval defense structures in Poland, whose interior is made accessible to tourists each summer.

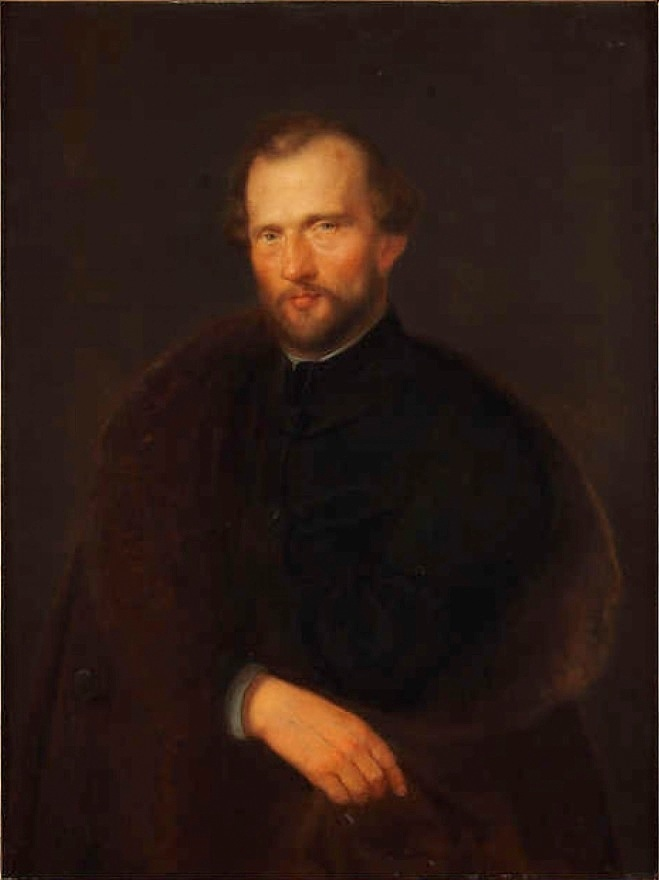
Portrait of Mikołaj Zyblikiewicz by Wojciech Stattler, at the Historical Museum of Kraków

== Museum branches ==
- Krzysztofory Palace Museum (permanent exhibition: Cyberteka. Kraków − time and space)

Main branch location at: Krzysztofory Palace on Main Market Square (Rynek Główny) 35, Kraków

- The Old Synagogue (permanent exhibition: The history and Culture of Jews in Kraków)
- Oskar Schindler's Factory (permanent exhibition: Kraków – the time of occupation 1939–1945)
- The Eagle Pharmacy (permanent exhibition: Tadeusz Pankiewicz's Pharmacy in Kraków Ghetto)
- Pomorska Museum, Gestapo prison (permanent exhibition: Cracovians against terror 1939-1945-1956)
- The Hipolit House (permanent exhibition: Bourgeois house)
- Town Hall Tower
- The Barbican museum (Barbakan)
- City Defensive Walls (temporary exhibition: Defence route Defence Walls - Barbakan - Celestat)
- Celestat (permanent exhibition: Brotherhood of the Rooster in Kraków and City defence)
- The History of the Nowa Huta Quarter (temporary exhibition - about Nowa Huta)
- The Zwierzyniec House
- Rynek Underground (permanent exhibition: Following the traces of European identity of Kraków)
- The Cross House (under renovation as of March 2008 - closed)
- Thesaurus Cracoviensis
- The Podgórze Museum (permanent exhibition: In the Shadow of Krak's Mound)
- KL Plaszow (temporary exhibition: Former KL Plaszow)

== See also ==
- Culture of Kraków
- Archaeological Museum of Kraków
