= Pomorska Street =

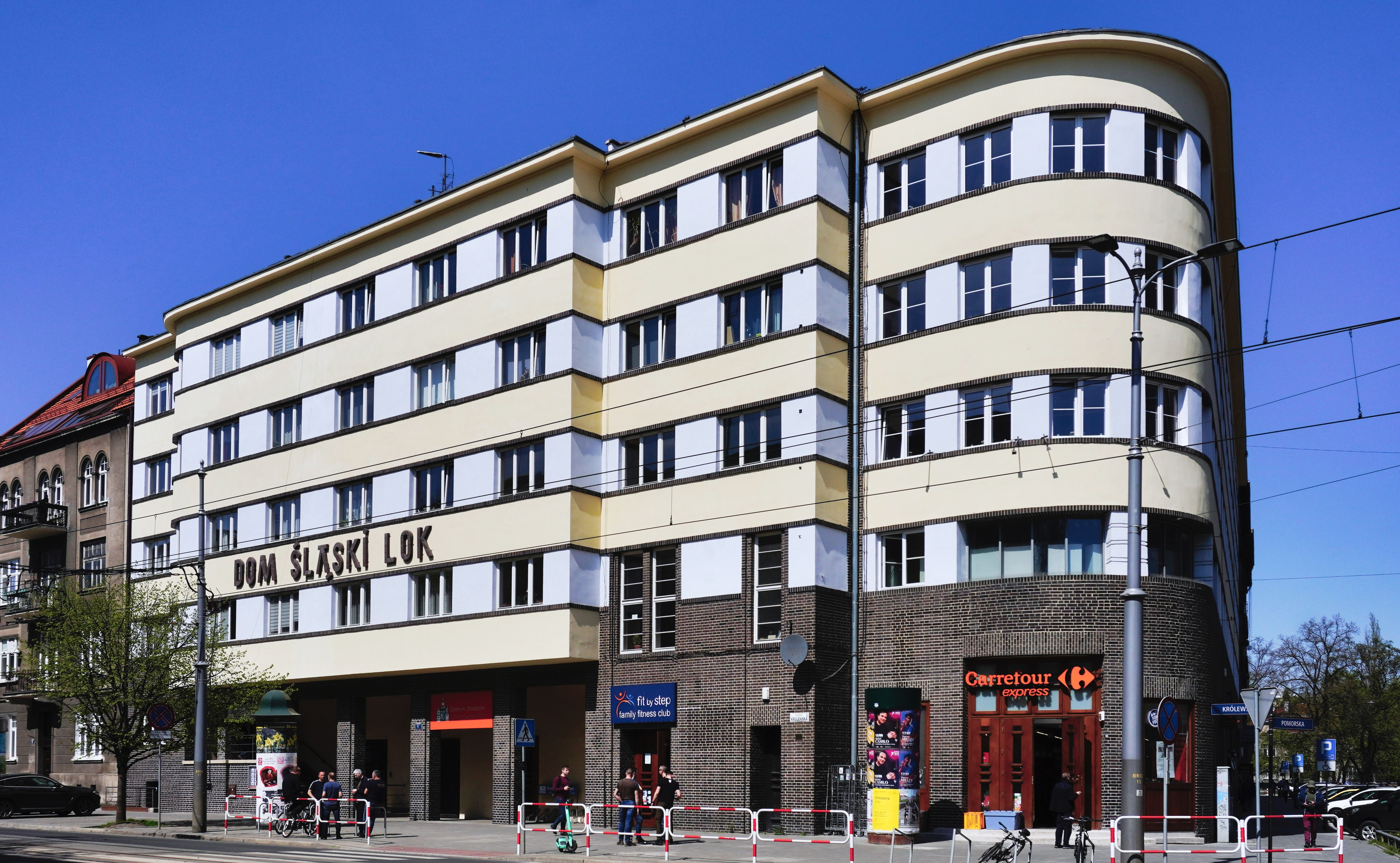
- Branch of the Historical Museum of Kraków
- Established: 1899
- Location: Kraków, Poland
- Coordinates: 50.07080°N 19.92479°E
- Type: History museum
- Manager: Monika Bednarek
- Director: Michał Niezabitowski
- Curator: Monika Bednarek
- Public transit access: Miejskie Przedsiębiorstwo Komunikacyjne w Krakowie how to get there, see external links
- Website: www.mhk.pl/branches/pomorska-street/

Pomorska Street is a building also known as Silesian House (In Polish: Dom Slaski) in Kraków, Poland. The word "Pomorska" was for the Kraków 1940s generation a synonym for Gestapo headquarters and operations.

== Building ==
The building was originally built in the late 1930s for students from the Silesian region to live in Kraków.

It was used as offices during the occupation of Kraków by Nazi Germany's SS during World War II, and there is evidence of probable subsequent usage by the NKVD in the 1940s and early 1950s.

The building has now multiple usage including hostels on its upper floors. Tourist information variously identifies the building as Silesian House, Pomorsk. However, the museum is only in the basement, entered by the inner courtyard.

== Museum ==
The basement of the building was a place of interrogation and killings, and has been preserved as a memorial to Polish martyrs; the wall outside the entrance has a commemorative sculpture. The basement museum is now a branch of the Historical Museum of the City of Kraków – its name is "Muzeum Historyczne Miasta Krakowa – Ulica Pomorska".

There are two sections – the exhibition of "occupied Kraków" (Kraków w latach 1939–1956) and the "gestapo cells". The execution cell has "Dulce et Decorum est Pro Patri mori!" inscribed on its wall.

At least one of the 108 Martyrs of World War Two was known to have been interrogated at this location, and Polish General Stanislaw Rostworowski was killed in the building on 11 August 1944.

The branch of the Historical Museum of the City of Kraków at 2 Pomorska Street in the Silesian House was founded in 1981. Its primary purpose is to take care of historical places of tortures of many thousands of Poles during World War II – the former detention cells of Gestapo in Kraków. Those cells, kept in their former shape, are proof of the tragic days of German occupation in 1939–1945. However, the most important themes of Kraków's history of this period are presented in the permanent exhibition "People of Kraków in times of terror 1939-1945-1956".

For many years the museum has researched Kraków's history from the period of the German occupation and Stalin's time. For two years the museum collaborated with the Little Poland History Fans Society "Rawelin". The purpose of this collaboration is popularization of the Kraków's history of the times. In November 2006 together they opened the air-raid shelter.

The building at 2 Pomorska Street was built between 1931 and 1936 by the initiative of Western Territories Defense Society. There was a pupils' hostel and a hostel for Silesian youth visiting and studying in Kraków (therefore the name "Silesian House").

From 13 September 1939 until 17 January 1945, the building was occupied by German police formations and was the Headquarters of the Security Police and Security Service for the Kraków's District.

After the war, Silesian House was turned over for administration to the League of National Defense, which, as time passed, became the formal owner of the building. Since 1981, it is the only national memorial site from the World War II period in Kraków which has museum status.
