= Church of the Holy Virgin Mary of Lourdes =

Roman Catholic church in Kraków, Poland

- Kościół Najświętszej Maryi Panny z Lourdes
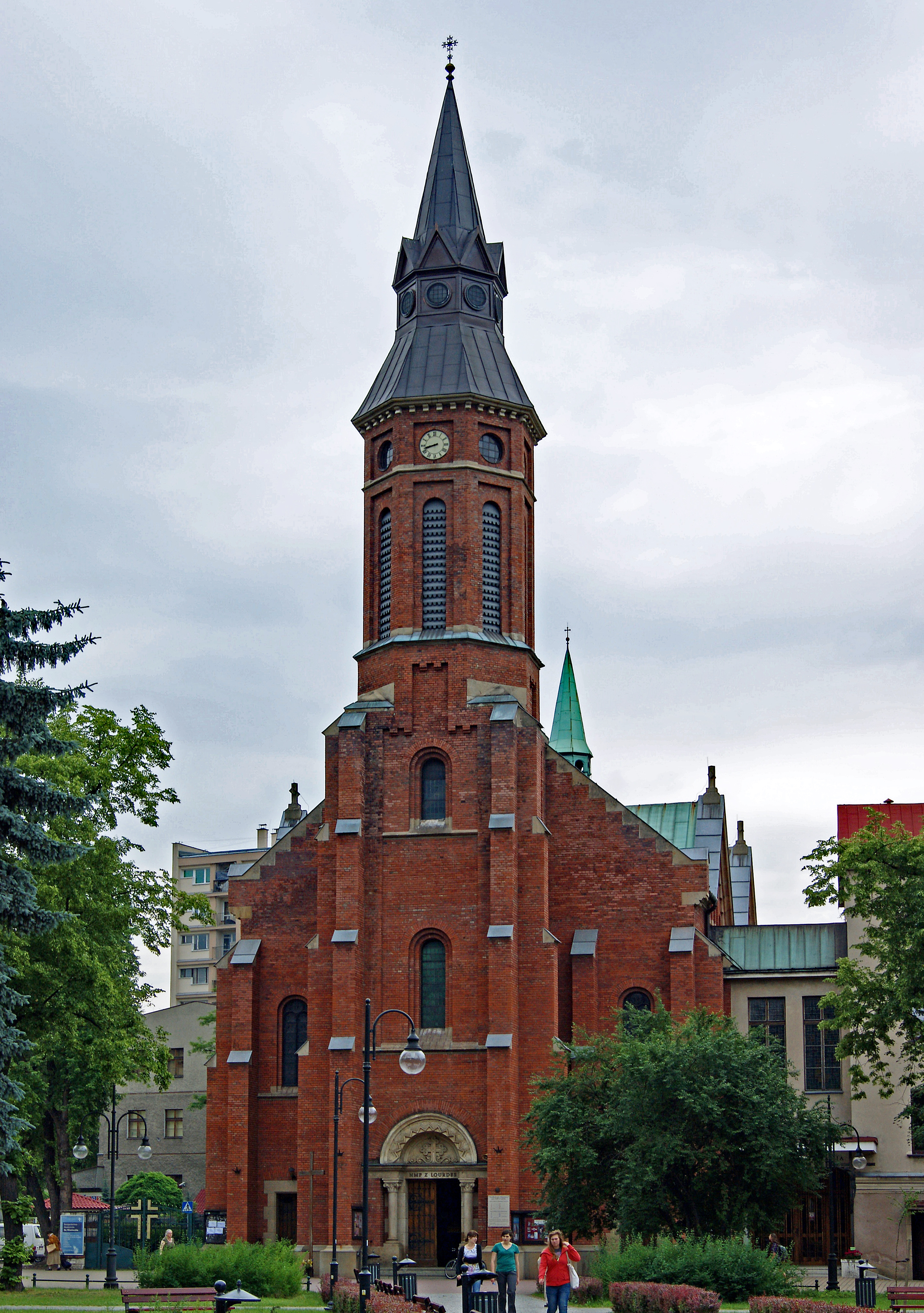
- View from the west.
- Church of the Holy Virgin Mary of Lourdes
- 50°04′16.3″N 19°54′46.2″E
- Location: Kraków
- Address: 37 Misjonarska Street
- Country: Poland
- Denomination: Roman Catholic

The Church of the Holy Virgin Mary of Lourdes (Polish: Kościół Najświętszej Maryi Panny z Lourdes) is a historic Roman Catholic parish and conventual church of the Lazarists located at 37 Misjonarska Street in Łobzów, the former district of Kraków, Poland.

== History ==
The corner-stone for the construction of the church was laid on June 25, 1892, although the first Congregation of the Mission already existed in nearby Stradom district in the second half of the 17th century, augmented by the Missionary house built at Kleparz in 1861 with the Seminary founded in 1878. The red-brick church, designed by architect Stefan Żołdani in the Gothic Revival style, was completed in two years under the direction of Cardinal Albin Dunajewski.

The parish was founded on January 1, 1923. Two more parishes were established further apart in Communist Poland. The church was upgraded and repainted several times. Side-altars were added and the presbytery was enlarged. The figure of Our Lady of Lourdes featured at the main altar, and carved in wood, is an exact copy of the Mother of God from the Grotto of Apparitions at Lourdes in south-western France, a major place of Roman Catholic pilgrimage and miraculous healings visited by John Paul II in August 2004.

== Architecture ==
The church building has a total length of 42.9 metres, with a width of 16.5 m, and a height of 20.8 m (to the top of metal roof) or 45.5 m to the top of the steeple. It consists of a nave with two aisles. The aisles are separated from the nave by a row of pillars and columns. The central nave is 8.5 m wide, with a height of 16.5 m. The aisles are 2.5 m wide. The church has three altars, and a pipe organ by the entrance, supported by metal columns. It was built originally in the 19th century by Otto Rieger of Silesia.

== Mariański Choir ==
The church is home to the Mariański Choir (Polish: Mieszany Chór Mariański), founded in 1932 by Rev. Józef Orszulik during the interwar years,. It specializes in the music of the Renaissance and Baroque periods, but also performs Medieval and contemporary choral works. The mixed voice choir performs the music of J.S. Bach, W.A. Mozart, J. Haydn, G.F. Handel, as well as Polish composers F. Nowowiejski, A. Koszewski, J. Świder, W. Kilar, J. Łuciuk, H.M. Górecki and others. The choir performs and makes commercial recordings of Christmas carols annually. The proceeds from the sale of CDs are used to support charity actions by the Congregation of the Mission.

The Mariański Choir gives regular concerts, including some at the church itself. It performs at ceremonial functions during national holidays. Also, it participates in festivals across Europe and North America. It has made over 35 foreign trips including tours of Italy (with a performance at Castel Gandolfo), Germany, Belgium, Denmark, Czech Republic, United States, Hungary, and Lithuania. The group has released several recordings, notably collections of traditional songs popular with the audience during Christmas.

Mariański Choir, Vola Vola Vola
Music sample from song by Guido Albanese

The choir has received several prestigious awards including the 2012 First Place award at the Lesser Poland competition of choirs in Niepolomice, the Third Place award at the International Festival of Choirs in 2011, the Bronze Medal of Cracoviae Merenti competition (for overall accomplishments), as well as the Silver Thread and Trophy at the 19 International Festival of Advent Music in Prague in 2009, among others.

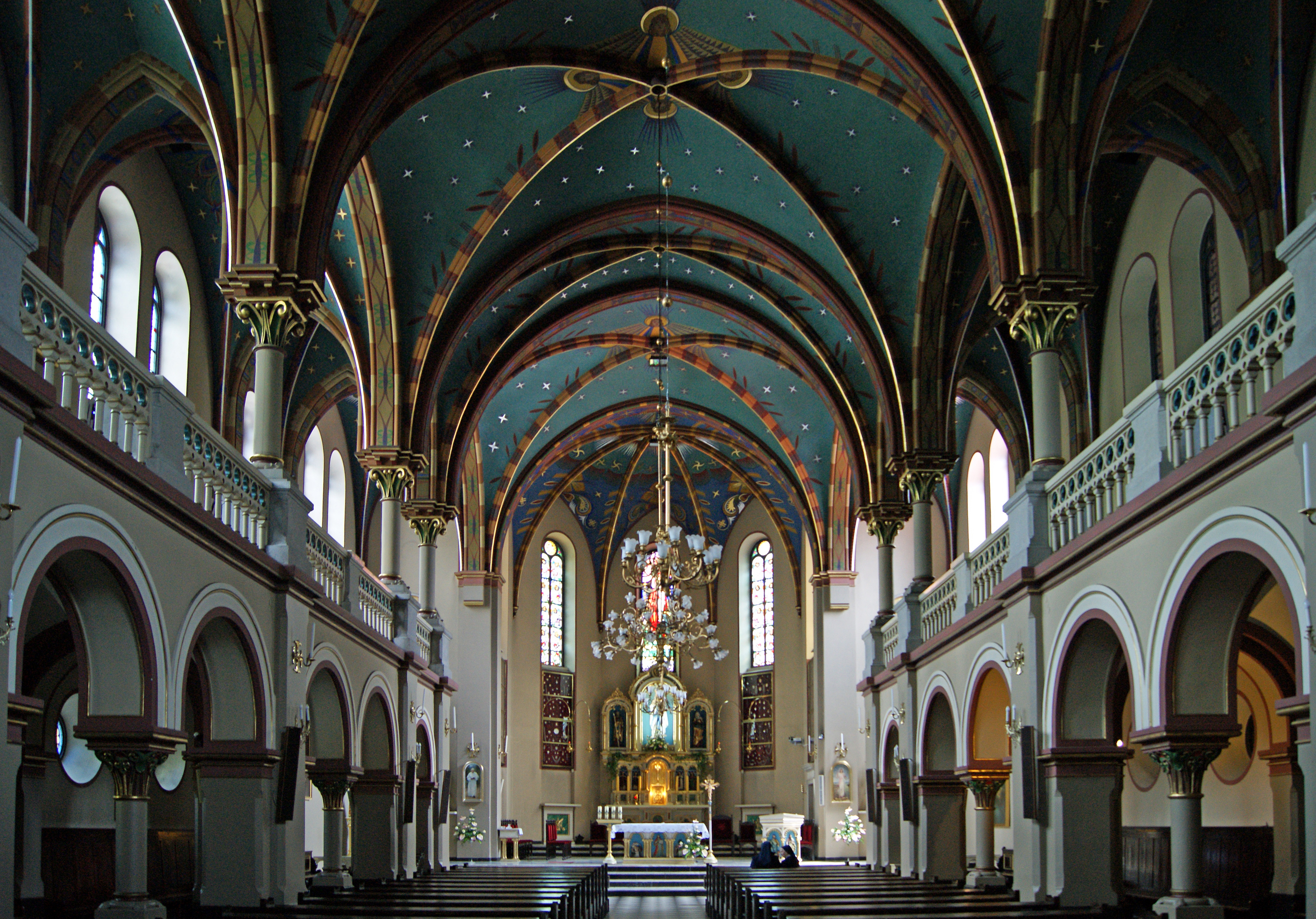
Interior

== Notes and references ==
- Media related to Church of Blessed Virgin Maria from Lourdes in Kraków at Wikimedia Commons
- Parish homepage at Misjonarska.org.pl (in Polish)
