= Town Hall Tower =

Tower in Kraków, Poland

- Wieża ratuszowa
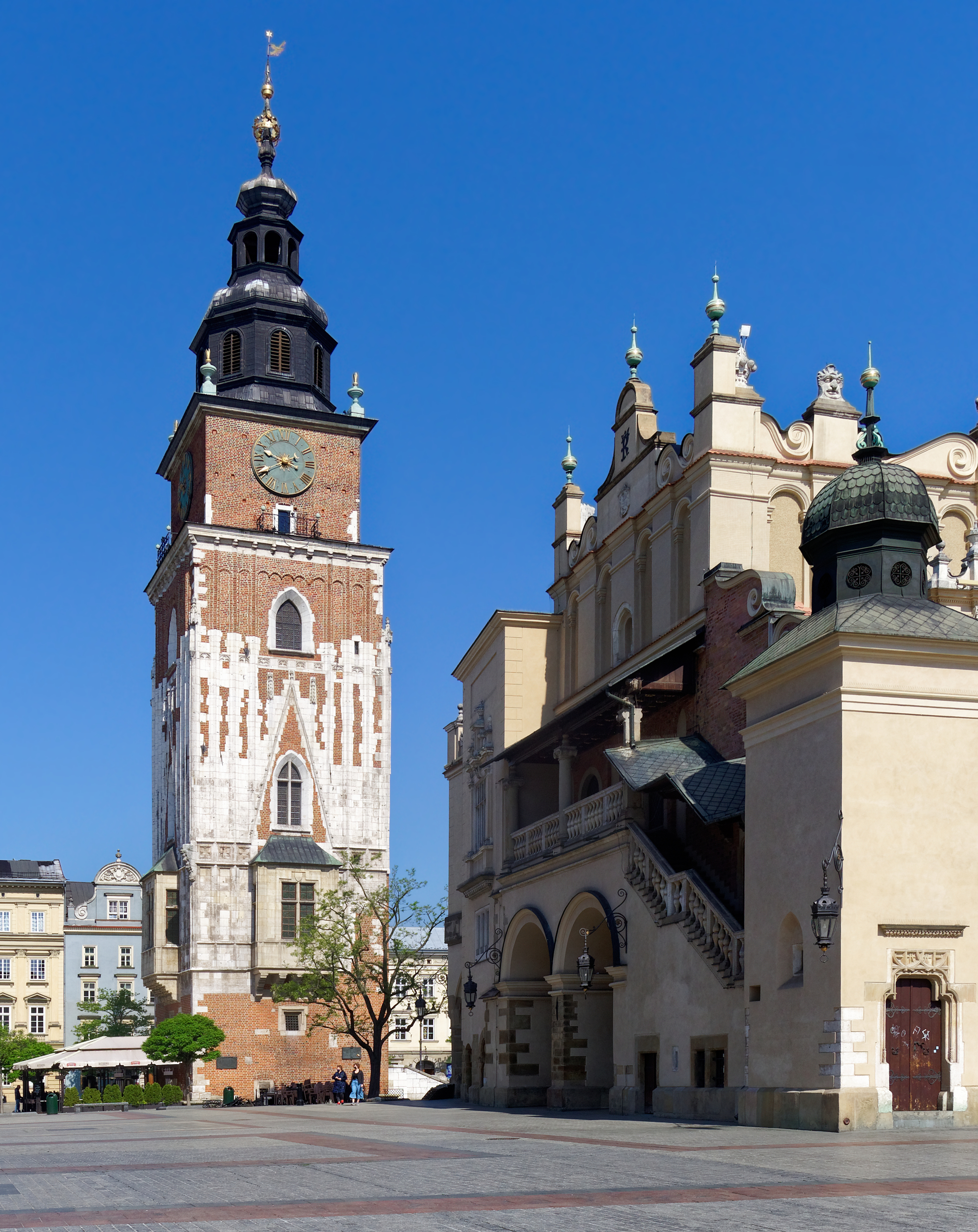
- The tower in 2020
- Location: 1 Main Market Square; Kraków; Poland
- Coordinates: 50.06150°N 19.93640°E
- Website: http://www.mhk.pl/branches/town-hall-tower

UNESCO World Heritage Site
- Type: Cultural
- Criteria: iv
- Designated: 1978
- Part of: Historic Centre of Kraków
- Reference no.: 29
- Region: Europe and North America

Town Hall Tower (Polish: Wieża ratuszowa) is one of the main focal points of the Main Market Square in the Old Town of Kraków, Poland.

The Tower is the only remaining part of the old Kraków Town Hall, demolished in 1820 as part of the city plan to open up the Main Square. Its cellars once housed a city prison with a medieval torture chamber.

In 1967, after a complex conservation which underlined its Gothic ancestry, the tower was put under the management of the Historical Museum of Kraków.

== History ==
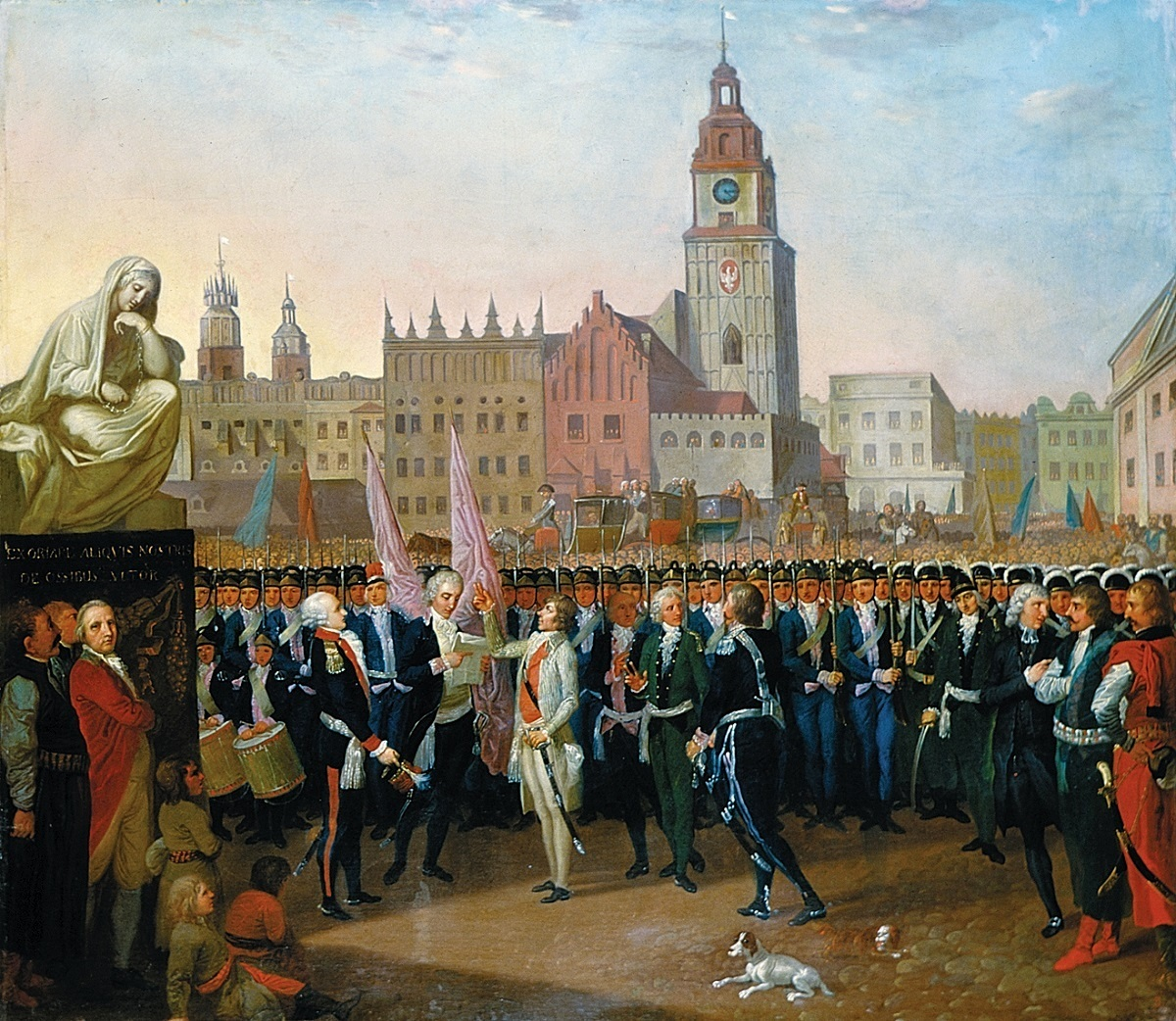
The red brick Town Hall with white bastion still standing on a 1797 painting by Franciszek Smuglewicz

Built of stone and brick at the end of the 14th century, the massive Gothic tower of the early Town Hall stands 70 metres tall and leans just 55 centimetres, the result of a storm in 1703. The top floor of the tower with an observation deck is open to visitors.

The original Gothic helmet adorning the tower was consumed by fire caused by a lightning in 1680. The ensuing reconstruction of the tower took place between 1683 and 1686. The work was directed by the royal architect Piotr Beber, who designed the new and imposing Baroque helmet, which survived only until 1783. At that time, the helmet began to crumble, and was replaced by a smaller structure (right) sponsored by Archbishop Kajetan Sołtyk.

The entrance to the tower is guarded by a pair of stone lions carved at the beginning of the 19th century. They were brought to Kraków from the Classicist palace of the Morstin family in Pławowice during the renovations of 1961–1965, during which the bay windows on the second floor of the tower were incorrectly reconstructed by a local TV personality, architect Wiktor Zin. Over the entrance is the original Gothic portal with the city coat-of-arms and the emblem of Poland. For many years the basement beneath the tower has been used as the performance space called the Stage beneath the Town Hall of the renowned Teatr Ludowy.

The tower serves as one of many branches of The Historical Museum of the City of Kraków featuring permanent display of photographs of the Market Square Exhibition.

== Town Hall Tower today ==
The Town Hall Tower is today one of the focal points on the Krakow Main Square.

From the highest floor, visitors can admire a wonderful panoramic view of Krakow. Additionally, in the middle of the deck, there is an old clock mechanism that visitors have the opportunity to examine from inside. The mechanism of the clock is controlled by radio waves receiving the signals from the transmitter in Mainfligen, which gives it the accuracy of the atomic time standard. In the event of a power failure, the clock stops and sets back automatically to the correct time when the power is back on. Also, the clock sets a time change itself in accordance with daylight saving time.

== Gallery ==
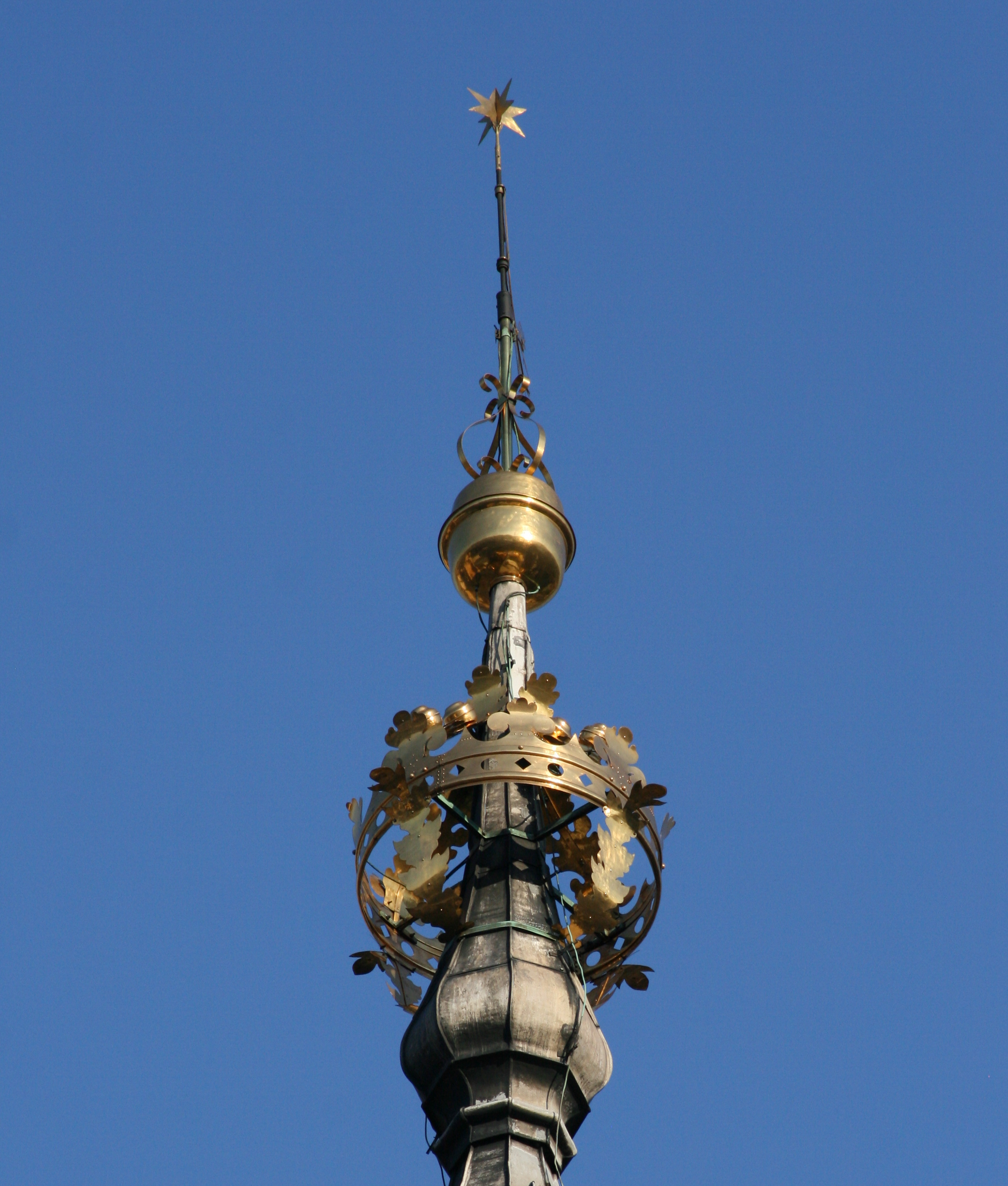
Detail of the crown atop the spire.

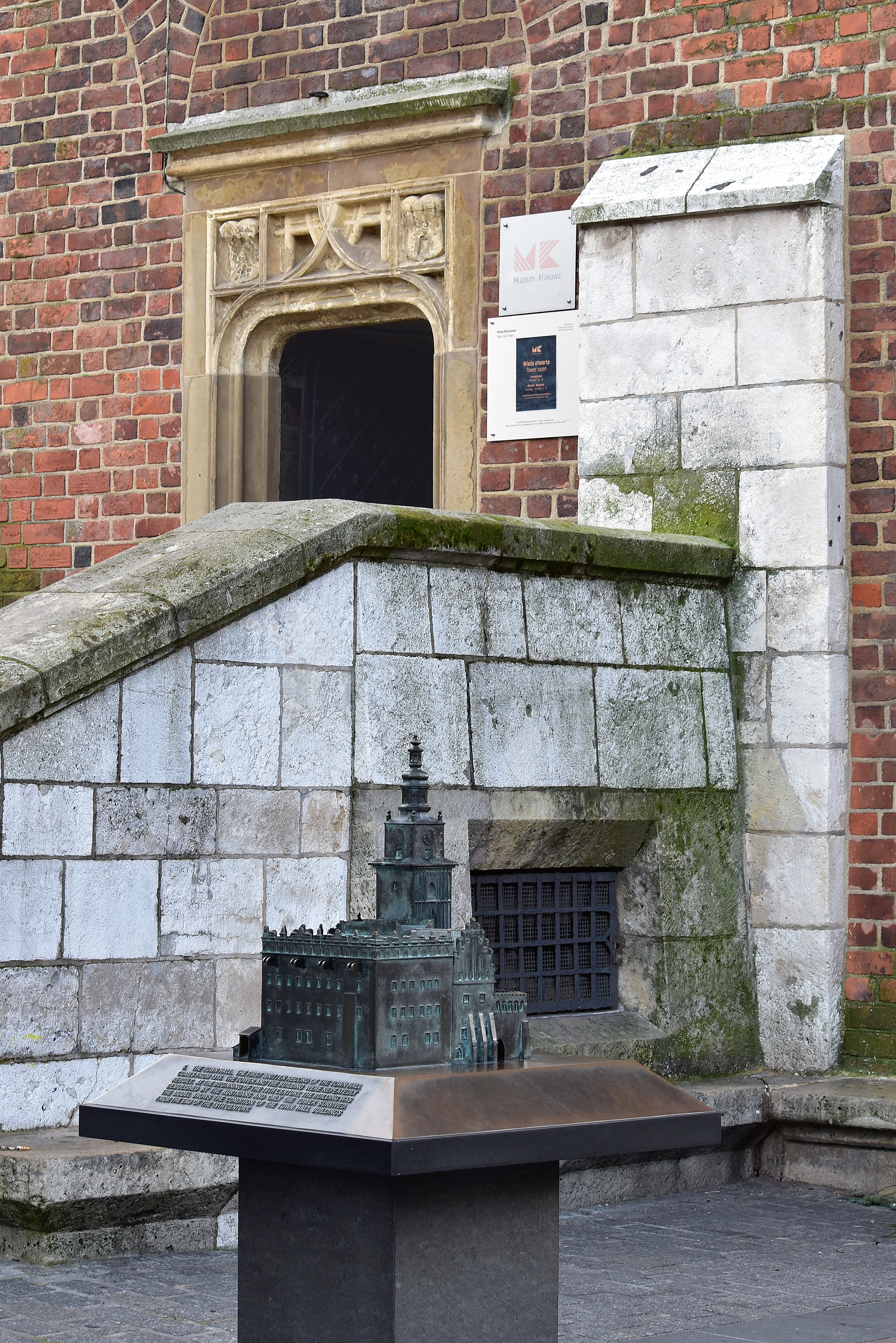
Entry to the tower with a scale model.

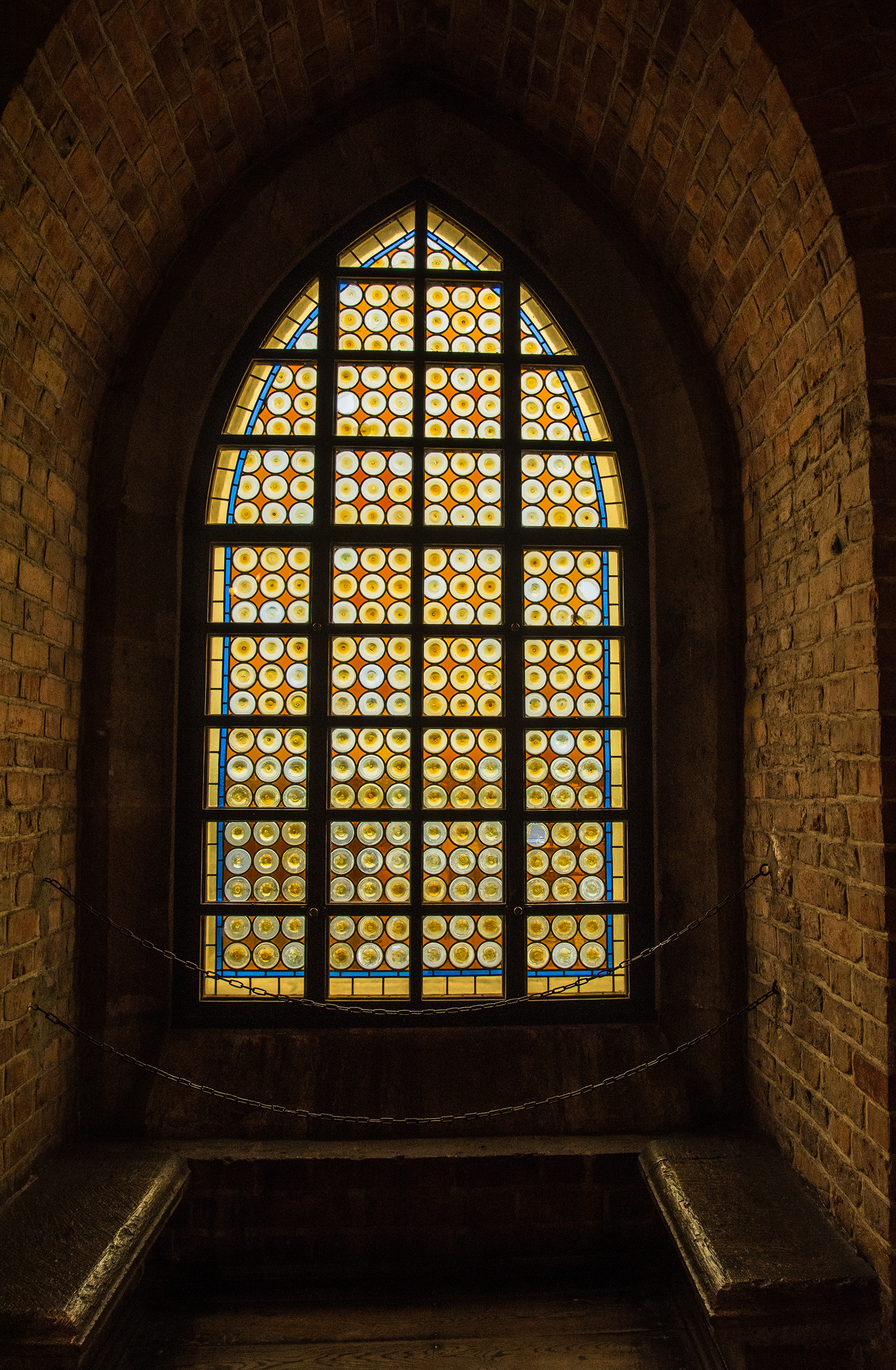
One of the stained glass windows.

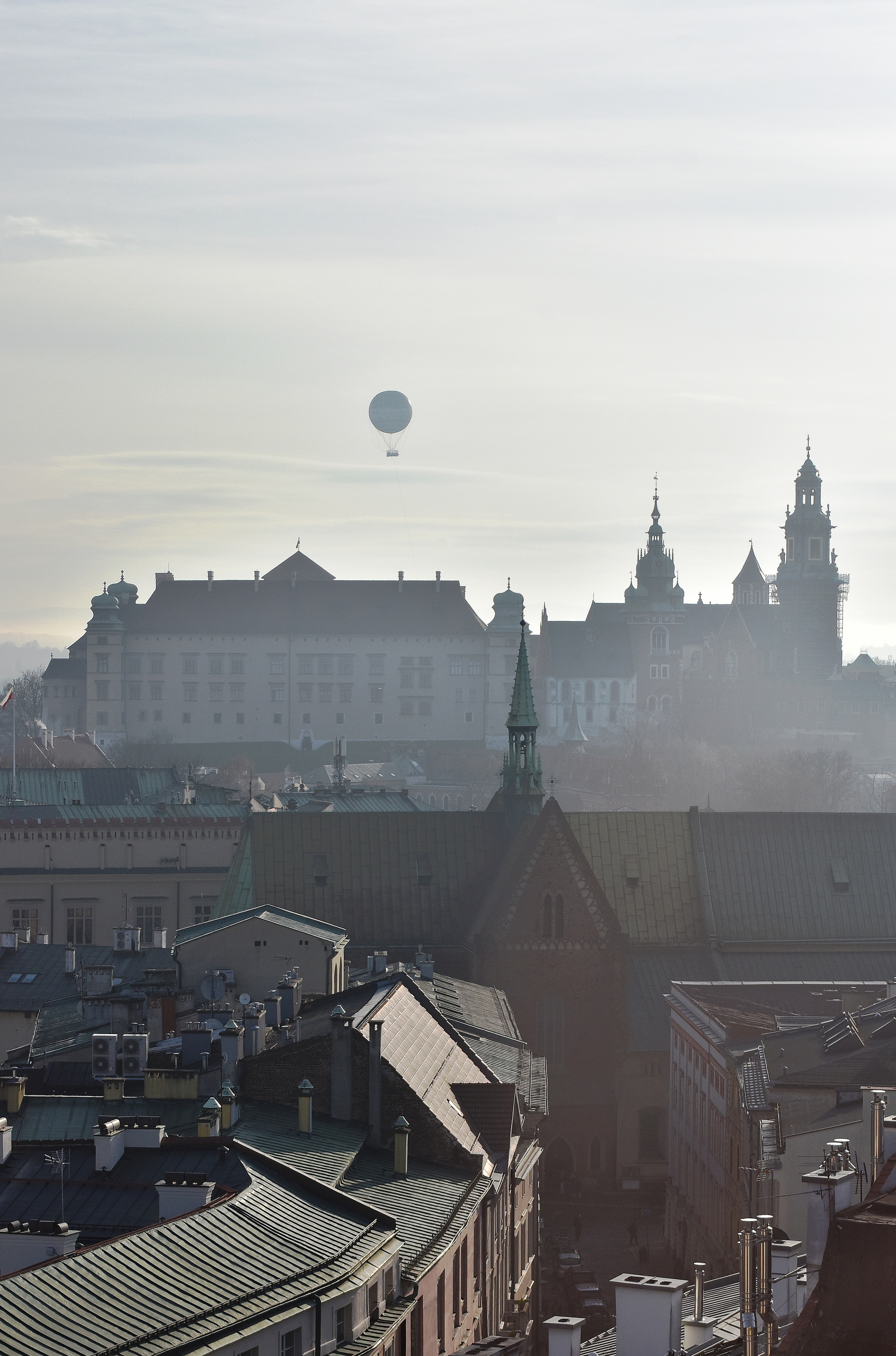
View of Wawel Castle from the balcony.

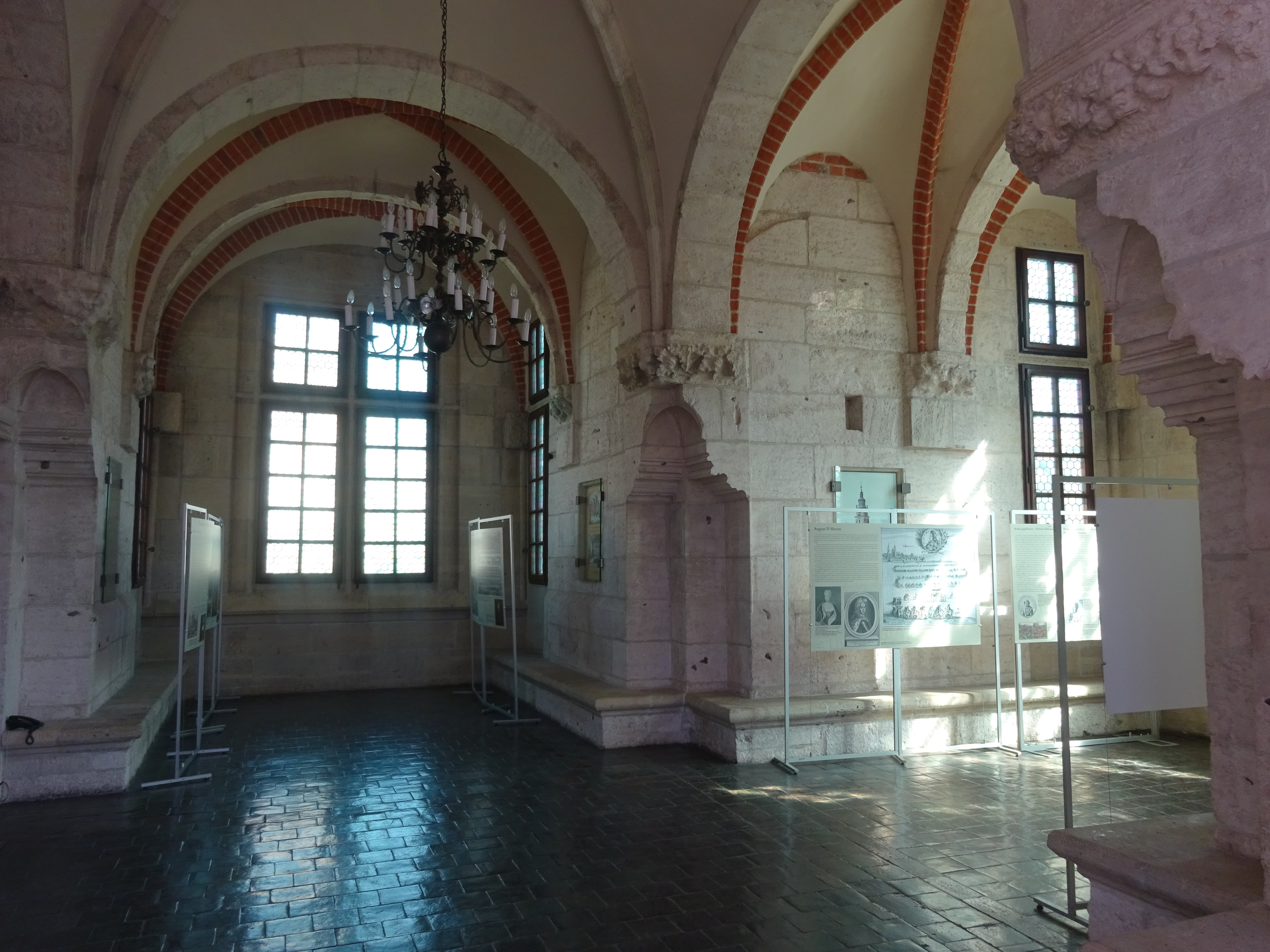
One of the exhibition chambers.

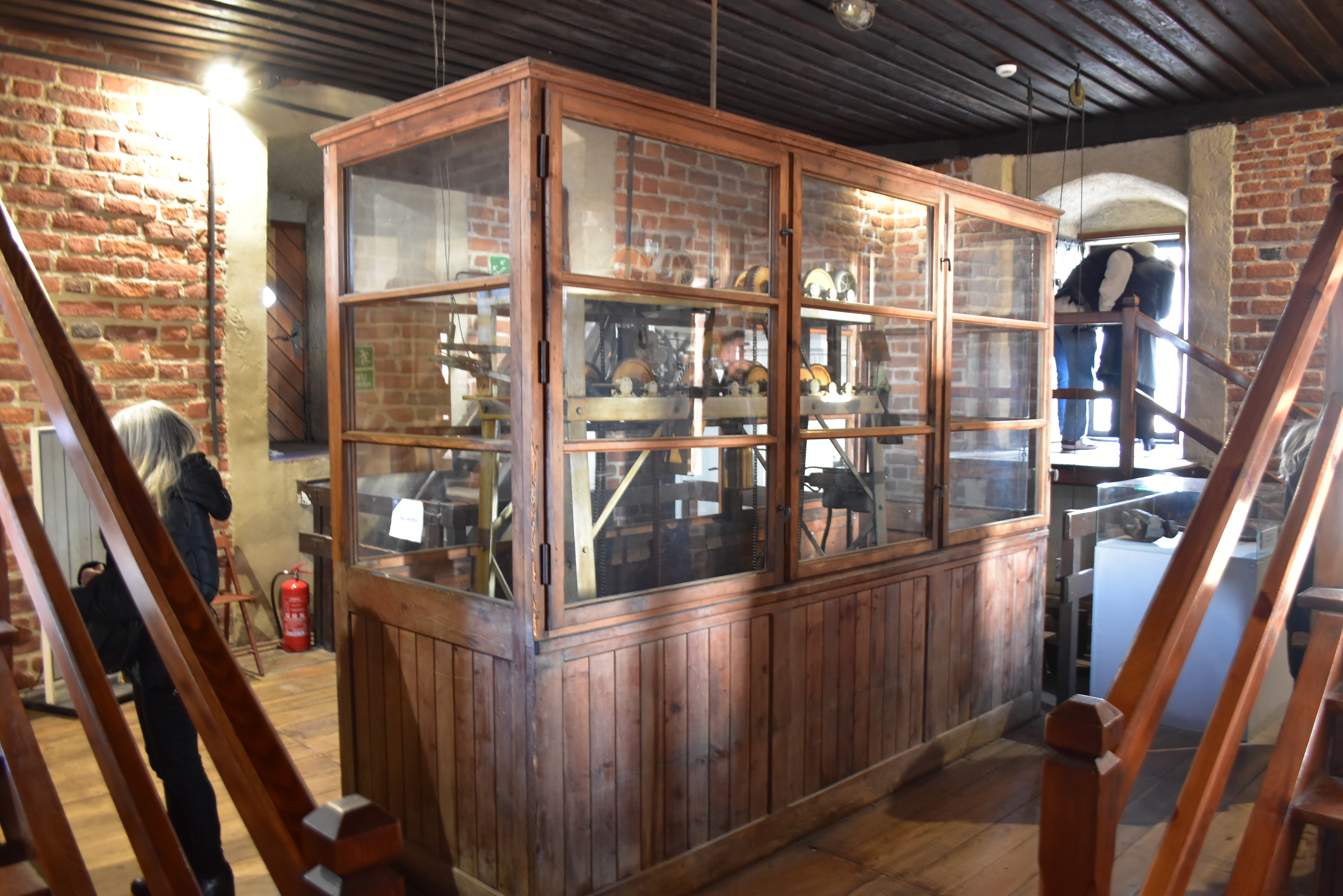
Tower clock mechanism.
