= Mariański Choir =

Background information
- Also known as: Maryan Choir (Polish: Chór Mariański)
- Origin: Kraków, Poland
- Genres: Sacred and classical music
- Years active: 1932
- Website: www.chormarianski.krakow.pl

The Mariański Choir (Polish: Chór Mariański), also known as the Maryan Choir, is a mixed choir based at the Lazarite Church of the Holy Virgin Mary of Lourdes in Kraków, Poland. The choir's repertoire includes works of great masters, religious compositions of Polish and foreign composers, international songs and folk songs, and fragments of operas and musicals.

Mariański Choir was founded in 1932. Since 1968, the group has been led by conductor Jan Rybarski. Members of the choir have varying levels of experience ranging from several months to over 40 years. Recently the choir toured in Lyon, Nice, Rome, and Vienna.

== Conductor ==
Jan Rybarski (b. 1941), conductor and organist, graduated from the Secondary School for Organists in Przemyśl and the Music High School in Kraków. His tutors were Idzi Ogierman-Mański, Józef Radwan and Jerzy Kurcz. In 2001 he received a doctoral degree in directing from the Academy of Music in Kraków.

Rybarski has been a lecturer of music conducting at the Pontifical Academy of Theology in Kraków. He is an Artistic Director of the Polish Federation of Choirs and Orchestras in Kraków and teaches organ and choral music. In recognition of his contribution to local culture and art, Rybarski received the Kraków Voivode Prize in 1995 and the Medal of the National Education Committee in 2003.

== Awards ==
Mariański Choir, "Vola Vola Vola"
Music sample from song by Guido Albanese

The choir has won many awards. The Grand Prix prizes and the first place awards include a gold medal at the Polish Festival of choral song in Katowice, a Grand Prix at a competition dedicated to Pope John Paul II in Kraków, and festivals of Christmas carols at Myślenice and in Prague. Prizes were won at festivals in Misdroy, Caecilianum (2000) and in Warsaw (2004), Loretto and Gorizia in Italy, Košice, Ilava, Mogilev, and in Frankfurt am Main and Berlin.
