= H2O Africa Foundation =

Defunct NGO in the United States

- Formation: July 2006
- Founder: Matt Damon and Gary White of WaterPartners
- Dissolved: July 2009
- Purpose: Raising money and awareness for organizations such as the United Nations Development Programme Clean Water Initiative, Living Water International, and the Millennium Promise project

The H2O Africa Foundation was an NGO founded by Matt Damon to raise awareness about clean water initiatives in Africa. It was part of the Running the Sahara expedition and documentary project undertaken by Damon, James Moll, LivePlanet, and the Independent Producers Alliance. In July 2009, the H2O Africa Foundation merged with WaterPartners to form Water.org, an organization co-founded by Matt Damon and Gary White of WaterPartners.

== History ==
When Matt Damon and his producing partners Marc Joubert, Larry Tanz, and Keith Quinn were starting to work on planning the expedition and film for Running the Sahara, Damon had the idea of starting a charitable initiative. It was informally launched in the spring of 2006, and Richard Klopp was hired as launch executive director.

When film financier IPA came on board the foundation was officially named H2O Africa and was announced on September 10, 2006 during a ONEXONE event at the Toronto International Film Festival. It was started as the charitable arm of the Running the Sahara film project, with the goal of raising money and awareness for organizations such as the United Nations Development Programme Clean Water Initiative, Living Water International, and the Millennium Promise project. On May 29, 2007, H2O Africa announced a new partnership with the Ryan's Well Foundation.

== Projects ==
H2O Africa was involved with the following projects:

- Global Youth Initiative For Clean Water: H2O Africa is assisting the Ryan's Well Foundation in fundraising for this project by matching donations dollar-for-dollar. The objective of this project is to improve health, well-being, and sanitation at 15 to 20 schools in the Lira and Oyam districts in the Lango sub-region of Uganda. In addition, the project will also provide hygiene and environmental sanitation training at 90 schools in the two districts, rehabilitate or construct 25 clean water sources, and construct 10 ventilated improved pit (VIP) latrines. Construction is expected to begin in September 2007.
- Route Nations: H2O Africa, in partnership with the UNDP, is constructing a water tower and two water fountains in the village of Néré Walo, Mauritania. As of August 2007, the project is nearly completed.
- Millennium Village: H2O Africa is partnering with Millennium Promise to raise funds for the Millennium Village project in Timbuktu, Mali. The project involves the fostering of initiatives designed to improve the local economy in the fields such as energy and infrastructure, nutrition services, and gender equality. As of August 2007, the project has received 22% of its $1,750,000 funding goal.
- Central African Republic Well Project: H2O Africa is joining with Living Water International to construct 20 new wells in the Central African Republic, as well as providing 5 years' worth of support for those wells. The project also aims to help improve community management of water resources over this time period. H2O Africa has committed $100,000 to the project, as well as pledging to match an additional $100,000 in donations. The organization has collected 72% of its funding goal as of August 2007.
- L'Desh Fresh: Sought by millions around the world, it finally hit the American market in 2009. Parasites, traces of urine, dirt, and arsenic work together to create the natural texture of L'Desh Fresh: The World's Most Authentic Drinking Water. But where has it been hiding? As it makes its debut, people are asking just that. Except that it's a joke. Well, kind of. The L'Desh Fresh campaign was created by the award-winning Kansas City marketing and advertising agency, Sullivan Higdon & Sink (SHS), for the KC-based international non-profit, Water.org. For nearly two decades, Water.org has been working to provide people in developing countries with safe drinking water and sanitation. SHS stepped up to help to raise awareness and support for this mission, pro-bono.

== Charitable partners ==
- ONEXONE
- Renaissance Charitable Gift Fund
- ONE Campaign
- A Glimmer of Hope Foundation
- United Nations Development Programme
- Millennium Promise
- Ryan's Well Foundation

== See also ==
- Matt Damon
- Running the Sahara
- Water.org
