= The Nobelity Project =

- Formation: 2005; 20 years ago
- Legal status: Non-Profit Organization
- Purpose: Education
- Headquarters: Austin, TX, U.S.
- Founder: Turk Pipkin
- Website: Nobelity.org

The Nobelity Project is a nonprofit organization based in Austin, Texas, USA. It was founded by Christy and Turk Pipkin in 2005, while producing the film Nobelity. Their mission is to increase access to quality education and better the lives of children across the globe. The Nobelity Project's programs relate to educational and environmental progress. Their films include Nobelity (2006), One Peace at a Time (2009), and Building Hope (2011). In 2010, the Pipkins spoke at this TED conference.

The Nobelity Project has partnered with numerous organizations over the past two decades, including but not limited to Care, A Glimmer of Hope Foundation, Concern Worldwide and Architecture for Humanity. And more recently, with Dedan Kimathi University of Technology (DeKUT) for college scholarships, Start A Library Trust creating libraries in rural Kenyan schools, and BookSpring increasing literacy for low income families in Central Texas - just to name a few.

== Documentaries ==
=== Nobelity ===
Nobelity is a film that looks at the world through the eyes of nine Nobel Laureates. The film follows filmmaker Turk Pipkin’s personal journey to find enlightening answers about the kind of world our children and grandchildren will know. Filmed across the U.S. and in France, England, India and Africa, Nobelity combines the insights of nine distinguished Nobel winners with a first-person view of world problems and the children who are most challenged by them. The film features Steven Weinberg, Jody Williams, Ahmed Zewail, Rick Smalley, Wangari Maathai, Sir Joseph Rotblat, Dr. Harold Varmus, Desmond Tutu, and Amartya Sen. It was premiered at the SXSW film festival in Austin in 2006.

=== One Peace at a Time ===
One Peace at a Time is the sequel to Nobelity. Turk Pipkin again takes his camera and embarks on a journey around the world. The film looks at solutions to the problems of the previous film and at those who are making a difference, including the Bangladeshi creator of the micro-loan system Muhammad Yunus, Thailand's premier family planner Mechai Viravaidya, and The Miracle Foundation, among many others. The film underlines the idea that each generation has a responsibility to involve themselves in the world and to help make it sustainable for the generation that comes next. It was premiered in Austin on April 14, 2009.

=== Building Hope ===
Building Hope is the sequel to One Peace at a Time. After rebuilding a rural Kenyan primary school, Turk Pipkin and The Nobelity Project agree to help build the area’s first high school, including the award-winning RainWater Court, classroom building, science and computer labs, and a library. Through drought, flood and fundraising challenges, Building Hope chronicles the construction of Mahiga Hope High, and the connection between a thousand people in the U.S. and an African community working to create a better future for their children.

== Programs ==
=== Nobelity in Schools ===
Nobelity in Schools brings the films of the Nobelity Project to classrooms across the U.S. and abroad, to inform students about problems faced by the world and motivate them to become involved, through the words of Nobel laureates in the films. DVDs of the films are available to any teacher that requests one.

=== Kenyan Water Project ===
Seeing the stark poverty of a village in Kenya was a primary motivator behind the formation of the Nobelity Project. Students at the St Joseph's Mahiga Primary School had to walk for an hour to reach a stream to get drinking water and suffered illnesses from the unpurified water. The Kenyan Water Project was able to build a pump and provide running water to the school, and provide the classroom with supplies including some computers.

=== Mahiga Hope High School ===
In 2009, The Nobelity Project began construction on Mahiga Hope High School in rural Kenya. It is the first high school in the area of Mahiga near Nyeri. The school held its grand opening on October 1, 2010. The Nobelity Project is also building a science building for the school along with organic gardens to be completed in fall 2010. Construction of the school earned the Nobelity Project a nomination for Architecture for Humanity's book, Design Like You Give a Damn 2, a collection of writings about projects designed to benefit humanity.

=== Mahiga Rainwater Court ===
In 2009, Nike, Inc. awarded The Nobelity Project, in partnership with Architecture for Humanity, a "Game Changers Award", an architectural grant to build a multiple purpose game, performance and rain water collection facility. It is an athletic facility for Mahiga Hope High, as well as providing a community center for Mahiga. It also provides the schools only source of drinking water. The Mahiga Rainwater Court held was opened in conjunction with the school's grand opening.

=== Mahiga Hope Library ===
In 2010, construction began on the Mahiga Hope Library. This library will provide books to the whole community of Mahiga. This unique library consists of books donated by individuals along with personal inscriptions in each book, part of their book drive 1,000 Books for Hope. The book drive received contributions from individuals and school groups and the library will also provide text books and reference books in English and Swahili.

== Sources and external links ==
http://nobelity.org/ http://nobelitythemovie.com/ http://gamechangers.architectureforhumanity.org/proposals/rainwater_court_mahiga_hope_high_school http://www.austin360.com/movies/pipkins-living-by-a-charitable-pact-518890.html http://architectureforhumanity.org/node/1506 http://www.austinwomanmagazine.com/Articles/2009/10_OCT/54_Christy_Pipkin.html https://www.nytimes.com/2010/06/29/business/29flier.html?_r=2&ref=todayspaper http://www.lasplash.com/publish/Entertainment/cat_index_nyc_events/One_Peace_At_A_Time_-_A_Turk_Pipkin_Nobility_Project_Film.php
