= When Angels Sing =

When Angels Sing may refer to:

- When Angels Sing (novel), a 1999 novel by Turk Pipkin
- Angels Sing, a 2012 Christmas family drama film, adapted from the novel
