= One Peace at a Time =

- Directed by: Turk Pipkin
- Written by: Turk Pipkin
- Produced by: Christy Pipkin; Matt Naylor
- Starring: Willie Nelson; Turk Pipkin; Muhammad Yunus; Cameron Sinclair; Steve Chu; Caroline Boudreaux
- Edited by: Jason Chrien; Matt Naylor; Chet Hirsch
- Music by: David Rice
- Distributed by: Monterey Media
- Release date: April 14, 2009
- Language: English

One Peace at a Time is a film by Turk and Christy Pipkin. It was produced by The Nobelity Project and was premiered at the Paramount Theatre in Austin, Texas, USA, on April 14, 2009. It is the sequel to the film Nobelity. It has been shown in various countries.

== Summary ==
Building on his film, Nobelity, Turk Pipkin continues his global journey of knowledge and action with One Peace at a Time. While Nobelity dealt with global problems, One Peace at a Time focuses on specific solutions, directed toward providing basic rights to every child. Among the solutions Pipkin chronicles are the model Indian orphanages of The Miracle Foundation, the family planning initiatives of Thailand’s Population and Community Development Association and its founder, Mechai Viravaidya, Ethiopian water projects carried out by A Glimmer of Hope Foundation, and Architecture for Humanity’s global challenge to design housing affordable for communities most in need in areas as diverse as the Himalayas, the Amazon basin, and the slums of Nairobi.

== Screenings and awards ==
Won the Audience Award for World Cinema Documentary at the Maui Film Festival

Premiered at the Arclight Cinema in Hollywood, California.

Shown at the Heartland Film Festival.

Shown at the Hollywood Theatre (Portland, Oregon) and Auckland, New Zealand as part of the Architecture for Humanity Haiti reconstruction fund.

Shown at the 2009 Eugene International Film Festival

== Appearances ==
The film stars Turk Pipkin's long-time friend Willie Nelson. It also features the insights of Muhammad Yunus, the first economist to win the Nobel Peace Prize, Sugata Mitra, instigator of the experiment known as Hole in the Wall or Minimally Invasive Education, Cameron Sinclair, founder of Architecture for Humanity, Caroline Boudreaux founder of The Miracle Foundation, and Steve Chu, winner of the Nobel Prize in Physics and former U.S. Secretary of Energy.

== Production ==
With the 2006 film Nobelity, The Nobelity Project turned a spotlight on some of the most pressing problems facing human populations. In an attempt to find and document some of the inspiring efforts underway to begin to meet these challenges, Turk Pipkin spent three years filming One Peace at a Time. In the process, he traveled to five continents and 20 countries, once again interviewed Nobel Laureates, and worked with diverse organizations such as CARE, A Glimmer of Hope Foundation, Architecture for Humanity, and the Population and Community Development Association.

== Reception ==
The Austin Chronicle rated the film 3 out of 5 stars.
