= WaterPartners =

American nonprofit organization

WaterPartners International
- Formation: 1990
- Type: Developmental aid organization
- Executive Director: Gary White

WaterPartners International was an American nonprofit developmental aid organization tasked with the specific purpose of providing safe drinking water and sanitation to people in developing countries. Founded in 1990, it has since provided safe drinking water and sanitation to more than 200 communities in eight countries – Bangladesh, El Salvador, Ethiopia, Honduras, Guatemala, India, Kenya, and the Philippines. The organization's co-founder and current executive director Gary White is also a founding board member of the Global Water Challenge and Water Advocates.

In July 2009, WaterPartners International merged with H2O Africa to form Water.org, co-founded by Matt Damon and Gary White.

== Approach ==
WaterPartners' approach to implementing water projects involves four key components:

1. forging partnerships with local partner organizations in the countries it serves
2. involving the community at each stage of the project
3. selecting technology appropriate to the local community and their particular situation
4. integrating all projects with health and hygiene education.

The organization conducts monitoring, evaluation, and original research programs. It has initiated third-party evaluations of its programs to determine how it is fulfilling its mission.

WaterPartners' stated vision is to work towards providing safe drinking water to everyone in the world. Currently, approximately one in six people on earth lack access to safe source of drinking water. More than two billion people lack access to basic sanitation.

== WaterCredit ==
WaterPartners projects were funded through grants, loans, or a combination of the two. Its loan program is called WaterCredit. It uses the concept of microcredit to fund water sanitation projects.

WaterPartners received grants from organizations such as the PepsiCo Foundation, The Michael and Susan Dell Foundation, and Open Square Foundation (previously called the Agora Foundation).

== See also ==
- International development
- Water Credit in India
- Water supply and sanitation in Bangladesh
- Water supply and sanitation in El Salvador
- Water supply and sanitation in Ethiopia
- Water supply and sanitation in Guatemala
- Water supply and sanitation in Honduras
- Water supply and sanitation in the Philippines
