= Nobelity =

- Directed by: Turk Pipkin
- Written by: Turk Pipkin
- Produced by: Turk Pipkin; Christy Pipkin; John McCall
- Starring: Turk Pipkin; Ahmed Zewail; Jody Williams; Amartya Sen; Wangari Maathai; Joseph Rotblat; Richard Smalley; Desmond Tutu; Steven Weinberg
- Edited by: Chet Hirsch
- Distributed by: Monterey Media
- Release date: 20 March 2006
- Language: English

Nobelity is a feature documentary which looks at the world's most pressing problems through the eyes of Nobel laureates, including Desmond Tutu, Sir Joseph Rotblat, Ahmed Zewail and Wangari Maathai.

The film interviews each of the nine Nobel Prize winners discussing their vision for the world over the next 50 years.

Nobelity was premiered at the 2006 SXSW Film Festival and was the first of several sold-out screenings at Austin's 1,200-seat Paramount Theatre. The film has continued to be shown in theaters, at universities and schools, and in community centers and churches, as well as being released on DVD. Nobelity was written and directed by writer, actor and filmmaker Turk Pipkin and produced by Christy Pipkin, in association with The Nobelity Project.

== The Laureates ==
=== Steve Weinberg, Nobel Prize in Physics, 1979 ===
Steven Weinberg holds the Josey Regental Chair in Science at the University of Texas at Austin, where he is a member of the Physics and Astronomy Departments. His research on elementary particles and cosmology has been honored with numerous prizes and awards. In 1979, he received the Nobel Prize in Physics for his development of a field theory that unifies the weak and electromagnetic nuclear forces within the atom.

In 1991, Weinberg was presented the National Medal of Science. In 2004, he received the Benjamin Franklin Medal for Distinguished Achievement in the Sciences of the American Philosophical Society, with a citation saying he is "considered by many to be the preeminent theoretical physicist alive in the world today".

Among his many writings on theoretical physics are several books for scientists and lay readers alike, including The First Three Minutes, an eye-opening look at the origins of social commentary, and for his views on the essential role of science in society. Many of his writings on these and other subjects have appeared in The New York Review of Books.

"Science can tell you how to achieve certain things if you want to achieve them," Dr. Weinberg told Turk Pipkin during their conversations for Nobelity, "but it can’t tell you what you ought to achieve. There is an unbridgeable gulf between questions of what is and questions of what ought to happen."

Weinberg also works closely with the Union of Concerned Scientists, an independent non-profit alliance of more than 100,000 concerned citizens and scientists which augments scientific analysis with innovative thinking and committed citizen advocacy to build a cleaner, healthier environment and a safer world.

=== Richard E. Smalley, Nobel Prize in Chemistry, 1996 ===
Dr. Richard E. Smalley was awarded the Nobel Prize in Chemistry for his discovery of the Buckministerfullerene or Buckyball, a unique molecular structure of 60 carbon atoms. Some of the strongest materials ever discovered, carbon nanostructures are currently being used in numerous practical applications.

Smalley's interest in science began in his early teens, and he has been an eloquent spokesman for the need to educate a new generation of scientists to find solutions to the world's problems. "Be a Scientist — Save the World" was the title of his lecture on the great energy challenges we face in the coming decades. Finding a new source of clean and reliable energy," he argued, "would enable us to solve numerous other world problems, including the need for clean water and plentiful food."

"There are good things about challenges," Smalley told Turk Pipkin while filming at Smalley's office at Rice University. "Challenge brings forth the best instincts of our youth and ourselves, and urges us on to develop technologies that would otherwise not get developed, so I see this as a good opportunity for the nation to seize on, and frankly for the world."

After a long battle with leukemia, Smalley died at age 62 on October 28, 2005.

=== Dr. Harold E. Varmus, Nobel Prize in Physiology or Medicine, 1989 ===
Former Director of the National Institute of Health under President Bill Clinton, Dr. Harold E. Varmus is currently the President of Memorial Sloan-Kettering Cancer Center. A cancer biologist, Varmus is also a cyclist and an advocate for increased health care spending and medical research around the world.

"As a fraction of our gross national product, the U.S. is at the bottom of the 22 wealthiest nations on a list of donors," he pointed out to Turk Pipkin during filming for Nobelity. "Furthermore, only one-eighth of our foreign aid goes to health, and it doesn’t all go to the poorest countries."

In 1989, Varmus was awarded the Nobel Prize with J. Michael Bishop in recognition of their breakthrough research in identifying oncogenes, the discovery of which has dramatically improved our ability to understand and control cancer.

Varmus is also the co-founder of the Public Library of Science, a non-profit organization of scientists and physicians committed to opening the doors to the world's library of scientific knowledge by giving any scientist, physician, patient or student – anywhere in the world – unlimited access to the latest scientific research.

=== Jody Williams, Nobel Peace Prize, 1997 ===
Along with the International Campaign to Ban Landmines (ICBL), which she helped to found, Jody Williams was awarded the Nobel Peace Prize in 1997 for her work in the creation of an international treaty banning anti-personnel landmines. At the time of the ICBL's founding, tens of millions of mines were deployed around the world in 80 countries, and each year mines were claiming as many as fifty thousand new victims — most of them civilians, many of them children — who were crippled, maimed and blinded by mines.

The treaty has since been signed by 152 countries (but not the U.S.), and more than 1,100 square kilometers of land have been cleared, destroying 4 million anti-personnel mines, nearly 1 million anti-vehicle mines, and many more millions of pieces of unexploded ordnance. Adding to these accomplishments, 62 million stockpiled anti-personnel mines have been destroyed.

Williams is the chief strategist and spokesperson for the Campaign. She is a speaker on human rights, on the role of civil society in international diplomacy, and on individual initiative in bringing about social change.

"Every act you take on this planet contributes in one way or another to an outcome," says Jody. "When we launched the mine ban, we didn’t know what we would accomplish. But we did know it was the right thing to do."

=== Ahmed Zewail, Nobel Prize in Chemistry, 1999 ===
The Linus Pauling Professor of Chemistry at the California Institute of Technology, Ahmed Zewail was educated in his native Egypt before moving to America to attend Alexandria University and the University of Pennsylvania, where he received his PhD.

Zewail was awarded the 1999 Nobel Prize in Chemistry for his seminal work in the field of femtochemistry, which made it possible to observe molecular changes measured in femtoseconds, a measurement equal to a millionth of a billionth of a second. This work has expanded the understanding of molecular structure and the dynamics of matter, and has led to new fields of practical applications in technology and life sciences.

=== Wangari Maathai, Nobel Peace Prize, 2004 ===
The first environmentalist to be awarded the Nobel Peace Prize, Prof. Wangari Muta Maathai is the founder of Kenya's Green Belt Movement (GBM), a grassroots non-governmental organization (NGO) which has created opportunity and change in the life of rural African women and dramatically improved the Kenyan environment through the planting of 30 million trees.

=== Sir Joseph Rotblat, Nobel Peace Prize, 1995 ===
Born in Poland where he received his PhD, nuclear physicist and peace activist Sir Joseph Rotblat spent the past sixty years fighting against the proliferation of nuclear weapons. Along with Albert Einstein and Bertrand Russell, Rotblat was one of eleven scientists who in 1955 signed the Russell-Einstein Manifesto, a letter to the world calling for a total ban on nuclear weapons.

=== Amartya Sen, Nobel Prize in Economics, 1998 ===
Indian economist Amartya Sen is one of the world's leading authorities on human development, human rights and the causes of famine. Currently the Lamont University Professor of Economics and Philosophy at Harvard University, Sen is the author of numerous books, including the landmark work, Development as Freedom, in which he demonstrates that famine is not caused by a lack of food, but by an inability to purchase or acquire food due to poverty or a lack of a variety of freedoms.

=== Desmond Tutu, Nobel Peace Prize, 1984 ===
Anglican Archbishop Desmond Tutu was awarded the Nobel Peace Prize for his role as "a unifying leader figure in the campaign to resolve the problem of apartheid in South Africa".

After the fall of apartheid, Tutu headed the Truth and Reconciliation Commission, which was widely credited with helping South Africa avoid revenge oriented bloodshed following the fall of apartheid.

== Festivals and awards ==
- Winner of the Audience Choice Award at the Tahoe/Reno Int'l Film Festival
- Official Selection Maui Film Festival
- Official Selection SXSW Film Festival
- Official Selection Global Peace Film Festival
- Official Selection Maui Film Festival
- Official Selection Lauderdale Int'l Film Festival
- Official Selection Sustainability Documentary Film Festival

== Current projects ==
While filming at a school in Kenya which had no water or electricity, Pipkin was inspired to join with his wife in a larger endeavor, the education and action charity, The Nobelity Project, dedicated to a better world for children everywhere. The Project has also produced a sequel to Nobelity, One Peace at a Time, which focuses on solutions to the problems chronicled in the first film. Proceeds from the films serve as an endowment for current and future education projects, including Mahiga Hope High School; A high school in rural Kenya built by the Nobelity Project, and the subject of their 3rd feature documentary Building Hope
