= Fred Miller (producer) =

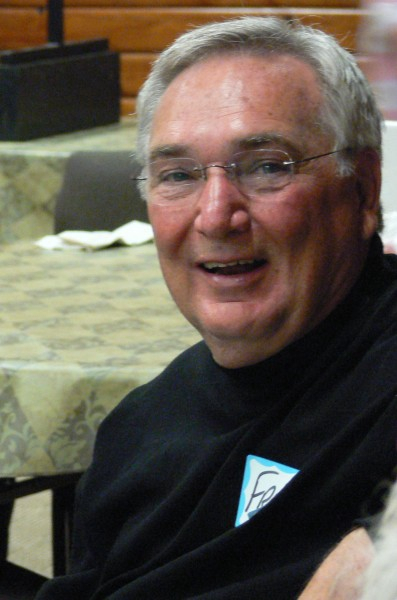
- Fred Miller, 2008.
- Born: Fred W. Miller; January 23, 1943 (age 83)
- Years active: 1969 - present
- Spouse: Kathryn Buffington Miller (1967-present)

Fred W. Miller is an American media producer, teacher and consultant.

== Personal life ==
Born in East Texas to Rupert and Era Miller (January 23, 1943), he was raised in Texas. His father was a minister who served several congregations in the state.

He is married to Kathryn Buffington Miller (1967) and has one son, Browning Blake Miller (born 1972). Miller and his wife reside in Austin, Texas.

== Education and early career ==
Miller attended Baylor University and studied Communications, graduating with a Bachelor of Arts in 1966. Following his graduation from Baylor and marriage to Kathryn Buffington, Miller entered the Metropolitan Urban Study Program in New York City directed by Bill Webber of East Harlem Protestant Parish. While participating in the study program, Miller also worked for WCBS NewsRadio 880. In 1968, the Millers moved to Austin, Texas where Miller served as an associate minister of First Baptist Church. It was there in March, 1969 that Miller met Peter, Paul and Mary and convinced them to allow him to make a documentary of their music and activism. That documentary, called The Song is Love, was among the first films made on Peter, Paul and Mary. The film, shot and directed by Tobe Hooper, aired on PBS for ten years starting in Easter 1970. The Song is Love was a major fund-raising event for PBS during the seventies.

Miller then began developing curriculum for the Texas Education Agency, using role-playing games and short “trigger” films to teach Career Education. During the seventies, Miller assisted Warren Skaaren in starting the Texas Film Commission. Miller also began developing feature films with John Heyman of World Film Services, Inc.

== Career ==
Filmmaker Al Reinert approached Miller in 1986 to assist in completing one of Reinert’s projects, For All Mankind. The film documents the Apollo missions from 1968 to 1972. In 1989, For All Mankind was selected as the Audience Favorite and the Grand Jury Winner at the Sundance Film Festival and was nominated for an Academy Award. The film participated in many major film festivals in 1989 and 1990.

In the early 1990s, Miller and a team of educators and sociologists designed a program for IBM called “The Advancement of Women.” Miller chose Rosabeth Kanter’s classic male and female stereotypes as the basis for humorous “trigger” videos. In addition to producing and directing the five videos, called “Perceptions”, Miller traveled to many of the IBM plants facilitating two-day workshops for IBM executives.

Texas Entertainment News! was founded by Miller in 1995 to combine broadcast television and Internet streaming. Though the show was top-rated, the lack of broadband users in 1995 prevented its growth and it was canceled after one season.

That same year Miller received the W. R. White Meritorious Service Award from Baylor University.

In 1999 Miller joined Lloyd Walker at Human Code, Inc., a digital-content studio that built web sites, developed computer games and created broadband programming. Human Code was eventually sold to Sapient.

In 2000, Miller produced and directed A Most Significant Journey, one of the first high definition traveling showcases presented in major cities across America. The 35-minute HD show gave a first hand look of what it was like to be a student at Baylor University in 2000.

The Comical Sense Company (now The Trevor Romain Company) was founded by Miller, Trevor Romain and Woody Englander in 2003 with the goal of promoting social and emotional fitness for elementary school children through animated programming. The Trevor Romain Show is seen on PBS. Some of the awards it has received are: Cine Golden Eagle, a top Telly, and the Oppenheim Gold DVD Award. Miller retired from the company in 2007.

Miller, along with producers Elizabeth Avellán and Shannon McIntosh, recently produced Turk Pipkin's Christmas novel When Angels Sing as a feature film under the title Angels Sing. The movie stars Harry Connick, Jr., Connie Britton, Willie Nelson, Kris Kristofferson and Lyle Lovett. Tim McCanlies is the director. The movie was released in theaters by Lionsgate.

Miller's newest movie is the feature film When We Last Spoke, based on the novel of the same name by Marci Henna. The movie stars Melissa Gilbert, Corbin Bernsen and Oscar and Emmy-winner Cloris Leachman, among others.

Miller continues to mentor and encourage young media producers, and has a longstanding relationship with Baylor University and Texas State University.

== See also ==
- For All Mankind
