= Building Hope =

- Directed by: Turk Pipkin
- Written by: Turk Pipkin
- Produced by: Christy Pipkin; Matt Naylor
- Starring: Willie Nelson; Turk Pipkin; Wangari Maathai; Auma Obama; Cameron Sinclair
- Edited by: Molly Conway
- Distributed by: Monterey Media
- Release date: 12 March 2011 (SXSW)

Building Hope is a film by Turk and Christy Pipkin. It was produced by The Nobelity Project and premiered on March 12 at the 2011 South by Southwest festival in Austin, Texas. It is the sequel to the film One Peace at a Time.

== Summary ==
After rebuilding a rural Kenyan primary school, Turk Pipkin and The Nobelity Project agree to help build the area’s first high school - including the award-winning RainWater Court, classroom building, science and computer labs, and a library. Through drought, flood, and fundraising challenges, Building Hope chronicles the construction of Mahiga Hope High, and the connection between a thousand people in the U.S. and an African community working to create a better future for their children.

== Mahiga Hope High School ==
In 2009 The Nobelity Project began construction on Mahiga Hope High School in rural Kenya. It is the first high school in the area of Mahiga near Nyeri. The school held its grand opening on October 1, 2010. The Nobelity Project is also building a science building for the school along with organic gardens to be completed in the fall of 2010. Construction of the school has earned the Nobelity Project a nomination for Architecture for Humanity's book, Design Like You Give a Damn 2, the sequel to Design Like You Give a Damn, which is a collection of writings about projects taking place around the world designed to benefit humanity.

== Screenings and awards ==
- Building Hope premiered on March 12 at the 2011 South by Southwest film festival. The film won the festivals' Lone Star Audience Award.
- Winner of the 2011 Best Documentary Award at the Maui Film Festival.
- Dove Family Seal of Approval
- Public Premiere on April 6, 2011 at The Paramount Theatre in Austin, TX.
- Premiered in New York at the Tribeca Cinemas on July 25, 2011.
- San Diego Film Festival
- Aspen Film Festival
- Nairobi Film Festival
- Napa Film Festival
