= Janji =

Running clothing company

- Industry: Running clothes
- Founded: May 3, 2012
- Founder: Michael Burnstein and David Spandorfer
- Headquarters: Boston, U.S.
- Website: runjanji.com

Janji is an independent athletic clothing company based in Boston. The company donates some of its proceeds to charities dedicated to improving access to clean water and advertises itself as being responsible and socially-conscious.

== History ==
Janji was founded by David Spandorfer and Michael Burnstein when they were students at Washington University in St. Louis. The original name of the business was "Edele." They changed the name, co-founder David Spandorfer said, because people could not figure out how to pronounce "Edele" and often confused the name with Adele. "Janji," its current and permanent name, means "promise" in Malay.

In 2010, Spandorfer and Burnstein won $15,000 in the Youthbridge Social Enterprise and Innovation Competition (SEIC) at Washington University; in 2011, they won an additional $20,000 from the UCCS Sports/Outdoors Business Plan Competition.

In May 2012, Janji launched their first product line at Big River Running, a specialty running store in St. Louis, Missouri. This first product line released shirts and shorts designed based on the flags of Haiti and Kenya.

== Charities ==
Janji works with partner organizations based in the countries they sponsor, with a focus on charities and nonprofits dedicated to providing water to developing nations. In an interview with a local newspaper in Brookline, Massachusetts, Michael Burnstein, co-founder, emphasized that Janji looks for organizations that provide "innovative" and "proven" solutions to the global water crisis.

- In Haiti and Kenya, Janji works with water.org.
- In Peru and Rwanda, Janji works with Living Water International.
- In Tanzania, Janji is partnered with MSABI.
