= Childless =

- Directed by: Charlie Levi
- Written by: Charlie Levi
- Produced by: Graham Leader
- Starring: Barbara Hershey; Joe Mantegna; Diane Venora; James Naughton
- Cinematography: Dan Stoloff
- Edited by: Michael Rafferty
- Music by: John Petersen
- Production companies: Childless; Granite Films
- Distributed by: Monterey Media
- Release date: September 13, 2008 (Boston)
- Running time: 90 minutes
- Country: United States
- Language: English

Childless is a 2008 American drama film written and directed by Charlie Levi and starring Barbara Hershey, Joe Mantegna, James Naughton and Diane Venora.

The sudden passing of a teenage girl unsettles the four adults in her life. Jarred by this glimpse of mortality, they struggle to understand – or justify – the current state of their own lives. As each gets ready for the funeral, they speak their private thoughts directly to the camera, leaving it up to the viewer to make sense of these off-kilter, self-serving, yet frequently humorous accounts of the family story. By the end of the day, more than a teenager has been put to rest. Hope beckons.

== Cast ==
- Barbara Hershey as Natalie
- Joe Mantegna as Richard
- Diane Venora as Mary
- James Naughton as Harvey
- Natalie Dreyfuss as Katherine
- Jordan Baker as Edith

== Accolade ==
The film won the Visionary Award at the Boston Film Festival.
