= MSABI =

Tanzanian NGO focused on water sanitation, hygiene, and education

- MSABI logo
- Established: 2009
- Founder: Dale Young
- Staff: 73
- Website: msabi.org

MSABI is a non-governmental organization founded by Dale Young in 2009 in Ifakara, Tanzania. Its projects focus on water sanitation, hygiene, and education.

== Name and history ==
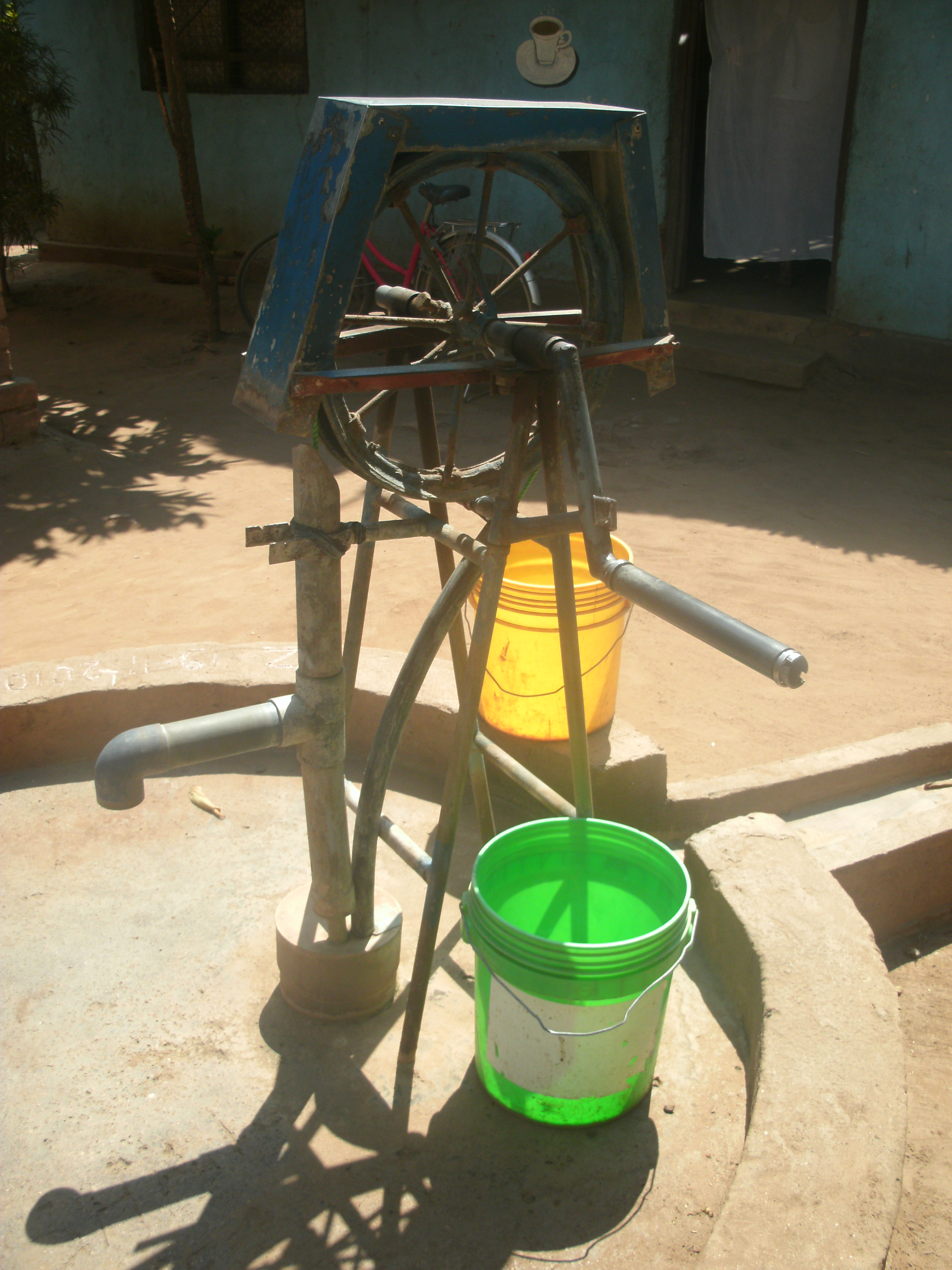
MSABI pump at a water point in Ifakara, Tanzania

Engineer Dale Young moved to Tanzania in 2007 with his partner who was conducting malaria research. He founded MSABI in 2009 after witnessing a cholera outbreak that resulted from unclean drinking water. The name stands for Maji Safi kwa Afya Bora Ifakara, which translates to "Safe Water for Better Health Ifakara." MSABI's projects focus on installing water pumps, distributing filter pots, building latrines, and educating people on sanitation and hygiene.

The aim is to combat diarrhoea, cholera, typhoid, and trachoma, which all may be caused from poor quality drinking water.

MSABI partners with Engineers Without Borders (UK) for surveying, drilling, manufacturing, and capacity building projects. EWB UK also provides international training courses at MSABI.

MSABI has provided more than 60 water points and more than 1,400 filters which together serve more than 17,000 users.

Janji works with MSABI.

== Ceramic water filters ==
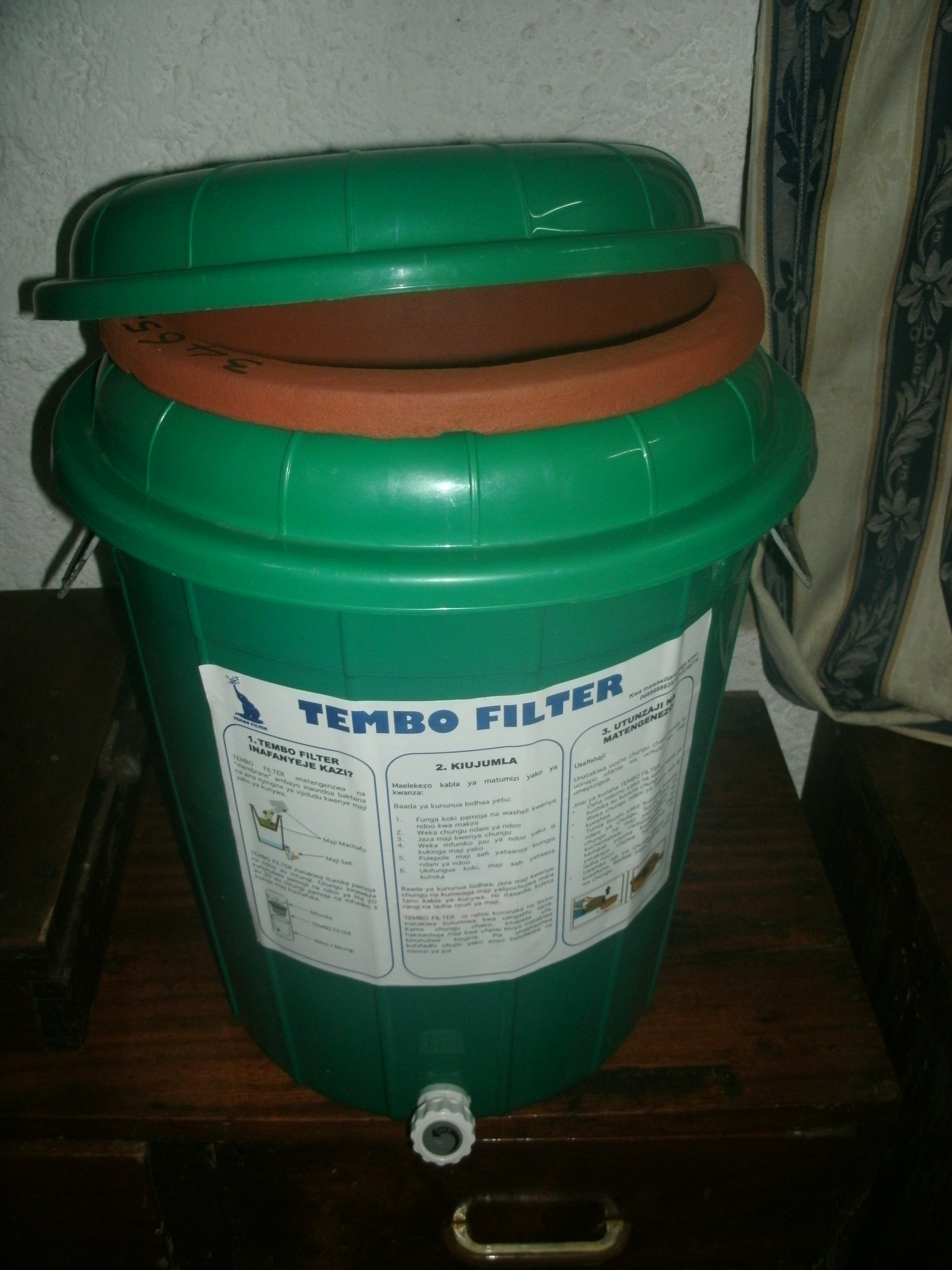
MSABI Tembo ceramic water filter pot

MSABI produces and distributes ceramic water filters, which are branded Tembo filter pots. The filters cost the equivalent of $18 USD. They are manufactured by the Upendo Women's Group in collaboration with MSABI. MSABI currently has a production capacity of 3,600 filter pots per year. These filters help remove iron and manganese known to be found in water in the area.
