= Gary White (engineer) =

American nonprofit founder and CEO

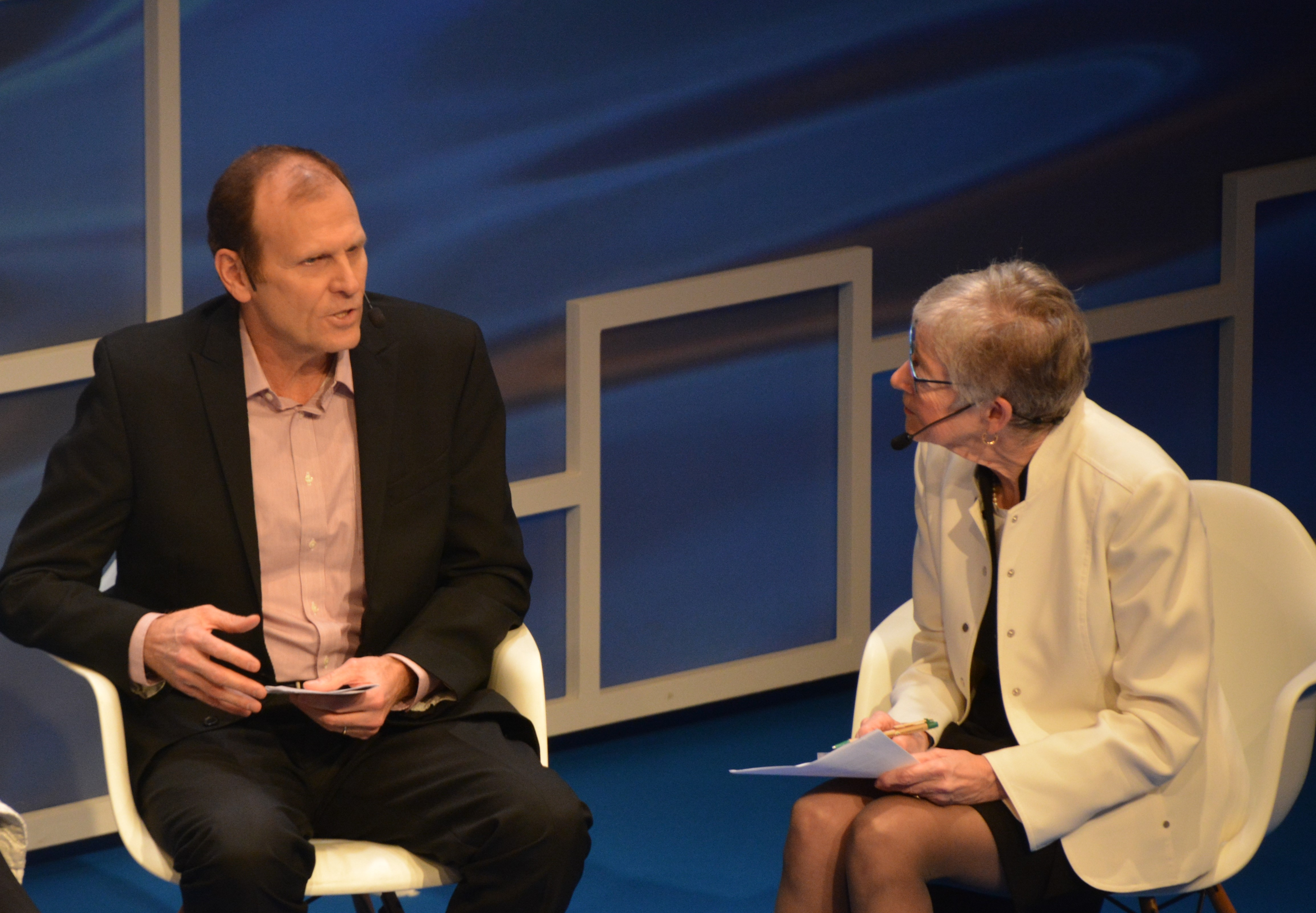
Gary White interviewed by Maude Barlow at the event "Water Matters" at the Nobel Week Dialogue 2018 in Stockholm

Gary White is the CEO and co-founder of Water.org.

White earned a B.S. and M.S. in Civil Engineering from Missouri University of Science and Technology in 1985 and 1987, respectively, and also holds an M.S. in Environmental Engineering with an emphasis on water supply and sanitation in developing countries, from the University of North Carolina at Chapel Hill .

In 1990, he co-founded WaterPartners, an American nonprofit developmental aid organization focused on universal access to safe drinking water and sanitation for people in developing countries. In July 2009, WaterPartners merged with Matt Damon's H2O Africa Foundation to create Water.org.

White is a founding member of the Global Water Challenge , the Millennium Water Alliance , and Chairman of the Steering Committee for WASH Advocates.

in 2009, White was named an adviser to the Clinton Global Initiative and in 2011, White and his co-founder Matt Damon were included in the Time 100 list of the world's most influential people . He was the recipient of the 2012 World Social Impact Award from the World Policy Institute, was named one of the Schwab Foundation Social Entrepreneurs of 2012 and was named one of Missouri University of Science and Technology's 28 Alumni of Influence. In 2017, White was awarded the Forbes 400 Lifetime Achievement Award for Social Entrepreneurship.

In 2022, Gary White and fellow Water.org co-founder, Matt Damon, authored The Worth of Water. The book invites readers to match hope with resources, to empower families and communities with safe water, and to end the global water crisis for good.
