= For All Mankind (film) =

1985 documentary film by Al Reinert

- Film poster
- Directed by: Al Reinert
- Produced by: Betsy Broyles Breier; Al Reinert; Ben Young Mason; Fred Miller
- Edited by: Susan Korda
- Music by: Brian Eno; Roger Eno; Daniel Lanois
- Distributed by: Apollo Associates
- Release date: November 1, 1989
- Running time: 80 minutes
- Country: United States
- Language: English

For All Mankind is a 1989 documentary film made of original footage from NASA's Apollo program, which successfully prepared and landed the first humans on the Moon from 1968 to 1972. It was directed by Al Reinert, with music by Brian Eno. The film, consisting of footage from Apollo 7 through Apollo 17, was assembled to depict what seems like a single trip to the Moon, highlighting the beauty and otherworldliness of the images by only using audio from the interviews Reinert conducted with Apollo crew members.

== Production ==
The idea for this documentary film began in 1979 after Reinert had researched a story about the Apollo program for Texas Monthly and learned that huge amounts of high-quality footage had been shot by the astronauts, only to be archived by NASA without ever being seen by the public. Although he initially thought that making a documentary about the missions would be relatively straightforward, it would be ten years before the final film was released.

Reinert and editor Susan Korda sifted through six million feet (1.8 million meters) of footage and 80 hours of NASA interviews to create the documentary. To copy the original film held at the Johnson Space Center, Reinert had to take an optical printer and scan each frame from the original 16mm film and enlarge to 35mm. It took him 18 months to copy the 80 minutes of film used in the documentary. Most of the footage used is of the astronauts and mission control during the Apollo program, but Reinert also used some footage from Project Gemini, such as Ed White's spacewalk from Gemini 4 (including the infamous lost glove), and a shot used to represent Trans Lunar Injection (TLI) that is in fact also footage from a Gemini mission re-entry.

Thirteen of the original Apollo astronauts were interviewed by Reinert. Among those providing narration are Jim Lovell (Apollo 8 and Apollo 13), Michael Collins (Apollo 11), Charles "Pete" Conrad (Apollo 12), Jack Swigert (Apollo 13), and Ken Mattingly (Apollo 16).

== Title ==
The title of For All Mankind comes from the lunar plaque left by the Apollo 11 astronauts:

Here men from the planet Earth
First set foot upon the Moon
July 1969, A. D.
We came in peace for all mankind

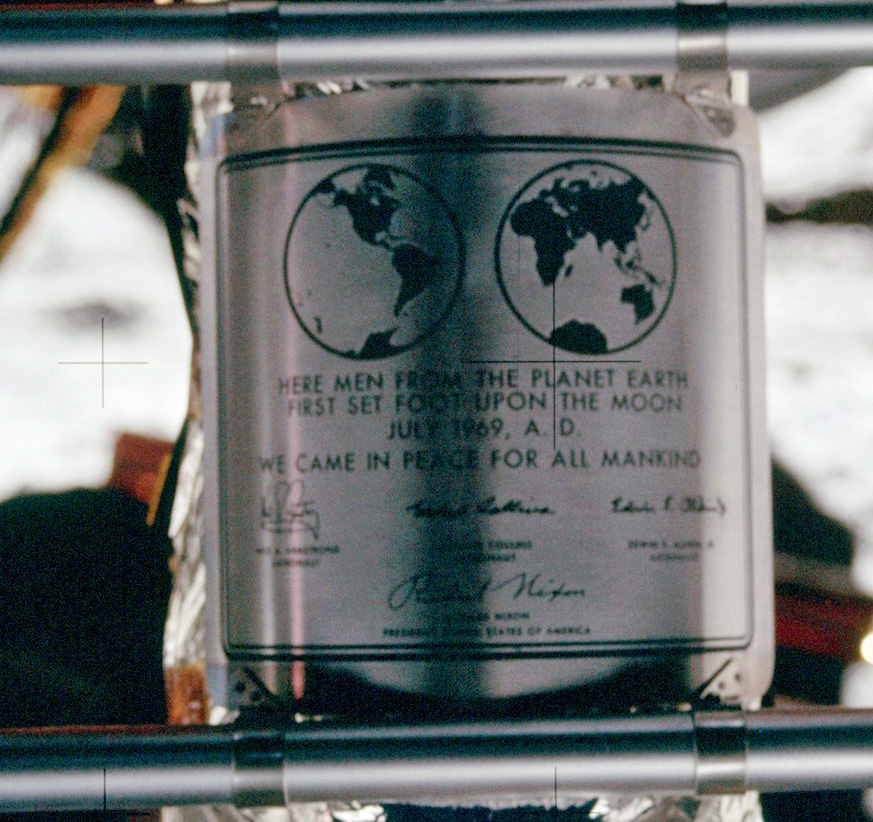
Apollo 11 lunar plaque.

The excerpt of President John F. Kennedy's Address to Rice University on the Nation's Space Effort on 12 September 1962 that is included in the film is slightly altered to better conform to this title. Kennedy said:

"The exploration of space will go ahead, whether we join it or not, and it is one of the greatest adventures of all time ... We set sail on this new sea because there is new knowledge to be gained and new rights to be won, and they must be won and used for all people ... We choose to go to the Moon. We choose to go to the Moon in this decade and do the other things, not because they are easy, but because they are hard ...."

Reinert dubbed over "people" with "mankind", the audio of which was taken from a different Kennedy speech.

== Specific views ==
Several unusual or memorable views are included:

- The fires of the Bedouin tribes in the Sahara, seen as dots of light in the extreme darkness.
- Sunrise over the edge of the Earth.
- A space-walk floating in silence over the Earth, despite travelling at an equivalent airspeed of 25,000 knots (46,000 km/h; 29,000 mph).
- A floating tape recorder providing music to the astronauts during periods of weightlessness, in particular when playing the theme from the Stanley Kubrick science fiction classic 2001: A Space Odyssey (1968).
- The first picture of the Earth seen as a whole circle from space "floating in a blackness beyond perception."
- Trying to prevent food from floating off during meals.
- The first close-up pictures of the Moon.
- Travelling around the far side of the Moon, including the "Earthrise" as our planet came back into view.
- The Apollo Lunar Module calmly drifting down at a low angle to the surface of the Moon, then burning its engines for a more vertical landing.
- Touchdown in the Sea of Tranquility: "The Eagle has landed."
- The first footstep onto the Moon by Neil Armstrong.
- David Scott dropping a feather and a hammer on the Moon to prove Galileo's prediction that, if there is no atmosphere, any two objects dropped from the same height at the same time will hit the ground together.
- Erecting the Stars and Stripes on the surface of the Moon.
- Gathering rocks and soil samples from the surface of the Moon.
- An astronaut tripping and speculating on his vulnerability should the suit be ruptured.
- Astronauts singing and hopping around on the lunar surface.

== Soundtrack ==
The film's original score was written, produced, and performed by Brian Eno, his brother Roger and Daniel Lanois and released as an album entitled Apollo: Atmospheres and Soundtracks in 1983 (at that time, the planned film project was named Apollo). By the time of the film's release in 1989, some of the tracks included on the album had been replaced by other pieces by Eno and other artists. These additional tracks can be found on the album Music for Films III.

== Home media ==
The Criterion Collection released For All Mankind on DVD in 2000, on both DVD and Blu-ray Disc in 2009, and on Ultra HD Blu-ray in 2022. All three releases feature two subtitle tracks, the first of which displays the name of the mission each shot came from and the name of each person shown on screen and the second of which also contains traditional subtitles for the hard-of-hearing, which specify the name of each person heard on the soundtrack. They also include a commentary track by director Al Reinert and Eugene A. Cernan, commander of Apollo 17 and the last man to stand on the surface of the Moon. The 2009 and 2022 releases also includes a making-of documentary and several other featurettes.

== Reception ==
On the review aggregator website Rotten Tomatoes, 95% of 20 critics' reviews are positive, with an average rating of 8.2/10. Metacritic, which uses a weighted average, assigned the film a score of 79 out of 100, based on 11 critics, indicating "generally favorable" reviews.

== Accolades ==
For All Mankind was nominated for an Academy Award for Best Documentary Feature in 1990.

At the 1989 Sundance Film Festival, For All Mankind won both the Grand Jury Prize Documentary and Audience Award Documentary.

It won the International Documentary Association's Best Feature Award in 1989.

== See also ==
- Footprints on the Moon, a 1969 documentary film by Bill Gibson and Barry Coe, about the Apollo 11 mission
- Moonwalk One, a 1970 documentary film by Theo Kamecke
- Apollo 11, a 2019 documentary film by Todd Douglas Miller
- Apollo 11 in popular culture

Awards
Preceded by Beirut: The Last Home Movie	Sundance Grand Jury Prize: Documentary; 1989	Succeeded by H-2 Worker
