= International House, Melbourne =

International House
- University of Melbourne
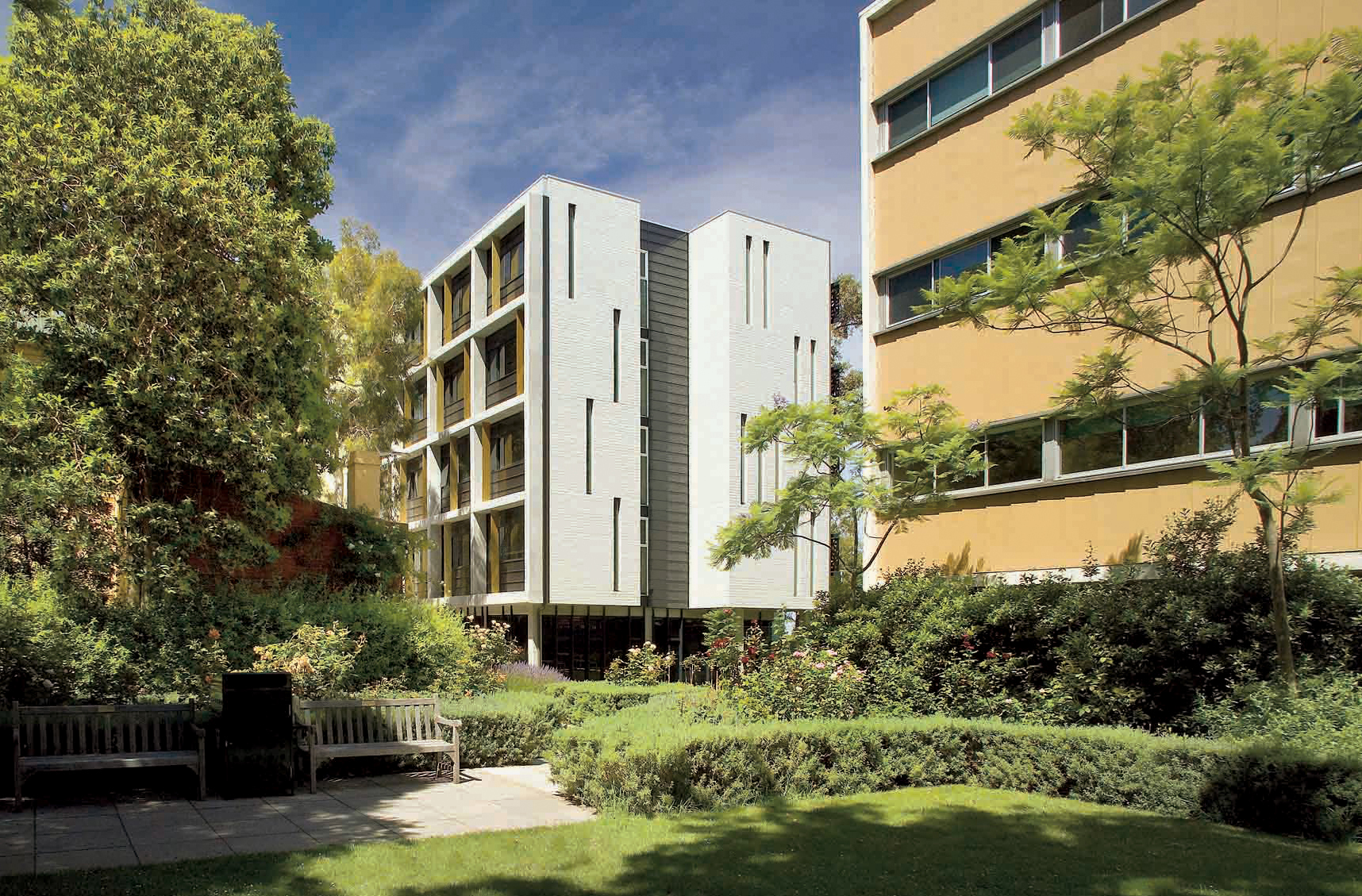

- Crest of International House
- Location: 241 Royal Parade; Parkville, Victoria
- Coordinates: 37°47′18″S 144°57′29″E
- Motto: Fraternitas
- Motto in English: Brotherhood
- Established: 1957
- Head: Dr Katherine Firth (Interim)
- Undergraduates: 283
- Postgraduates: 56
- Tutors: 10
- Website: ihouse.unimelb.edu.au

International House is a landmark institution within the University of Melbourne. Opened in 1957, it was the first International House in Australia and the first co-educational hall of residence at the University. Situated at 241 Royal Parade in Parkville, it provides co-educational accommodation to 350 undergraduate and graduate students who are attending the university and nearby tertiary institutions.

Still owned and operated by the University today, it maintains a direct link to the institution's academic mission. The House is a dedicated, scholar-focused community that emphasizes holistic development through pastoral care and peer mentoring, upholding a legacy of inclusion and global citizenship that has defined it for nearly 70 years.

== History ==
=== Colombo Plan ===
Shortly after the end of World War II, the Australian government invited university students from countries in South and Southeast Asia to study in Australia as part of an aid program called the Colombo Plan. Many of these students came to the University of Melbourne.

Various groups within and outside the University of Melbourne aimed to make these students feel welcome and assist them in forming friendships with Australian students. At the same time, racial misconceptions and general racism were common in the university.

=== Fundraising and establishment ===
The model for this new hall of residence was inspired by the International Houses Worldwide Movement and by International Houses that were already operating successfully in Europe and the United States. This marked the first such venture in Australia.

Fundraising by the student community and various community and women's groups began in the early 1950s and enjoyed wide community support. The Rotary Club of Melbourne was involved in establishing International House. This involvement has continued to the present.

The original site for International House, at 231–241 Royal Parade, was purchased in September 1953 for £13,500. Situated separately from the University campus and its ‘College Crescent’ of residential colleges, International House provided residents with the opportunity to spend more time 'at home' than at the university.

The hall began its first intake in 1957, welcoming forty-two men from Australia and overseas as an independent, multicultural, self-supporting residential hall owned and operated by the University of Melbourne. It was officially opened on 24 May 1958 by the Prime Minister of Australia, Sir Robert Menzies.

=== Admission of women ===
In 1972, International House became the first residential hall of the University of Melbourne to admit female residents. While the idea formed part of its original vision, the International House Council initially feared the inclusion of women might call into question the moral tone of the hall. In June 1971, the Council finally agreed to admit women the following year. Women and men initially occupied separate floors; however, mixed floors are now the most common type of housing.

== Coat of arms ==
Coat of arms of International House, Melbourne

The hall's arms are a blue and yellow shield containing three migratory birds in the lower segment, symbolizing the distance the students travel to live at International House. The image of Greek victory goddess Nike, derived from the University of Melbourne's coat of arms, watches over these birds protectively while offering an olive branch of peace.

=== Motto ===
Underneath the shield is the Latin word Fraternitas, meaning "brotherhood".

== Buildings ==
=== Ian Clunies Ross Wing ===
The Ian Clunies Ross Wing, commonly known as ‘Clunies’, was International House's first accommodation building. It was named in 1962 after the scientist Sir Ian Clunies Ross, the first chair of the International House Council. Clunies Ross was the Chair of Rotary International's Service Committee at the time and also a former Deputy Chancellor of the University of Melbourne.

=== Samuel Wadham Wing ===
The Samuel Wadham Wing was named after Sir Samuel Wadham, the second Chair of the International House Council. It was opened by (Lord) Richard Casey on 23 March 1963.

=== Scheps Wing ===
The Scheps Wing is a sixteen-sided, six-storey residence located at 207–215 Royal Parade. The land on which the Scheps Building stands was acquired by International House in 1965. However, the building was not completed and opened until 1972, which coincided with the admission of women to the International House.

=== Hilda Stevenson Building ===
The Hilda Stevenson Building is located on Leonard Street in Parkville. It was acquired by International House in 1966 and was initially known as the ‘Rudd Stevenson’ building before being renamed after Dame Hilda Stevenson, a generous benefactor to International House. Its acquisition enabled International House to expand the Dimmick Dining Hall northwards. This project was completed in 1970 after a fire destroyed the roof of the old dining hall.

Originally built for the Scottish stained glass merchant James Ferguson in 1886, the building had belonged to the Victorian Children's Aid Society Home before it was acquired by International House. The building was created in the gothic revival architecture style is interlaced with stained glass windows on the north and southern ends.

=== Greycourt ===
Originally built as a school (Carlton College) in 1881, Greycourt was acquired by International House in 1975. It was purchased from the Royal Melbourne Hospital, which had been using the building as nurses’ quarters.

The acquisition of Greycourt marked a pivotal moment in the development of International House. The hall's enrollment numbers surged to 245 students in 1975, positioning International House as the second-largest student residence at the University of Melbourne, behind Ormond College.

=== The Bob Fels Apartments ===
The Bob Fels Apartments are situated at 16–20 The Avenue, Parkville, and comprise 14 units. Acquired by International House in 1996, they were previously known as ‘The Avenue Apartments’ until being renamed after Mr. Robert Fels, a former Warden of International House who served from 1982 to 1997.

=== Dimmick Apartments ===
The Dimmick apartments are two flats adjoined to the back of the Dimmick Dining Hall above the kitchens. It started construction in 1956, and were opened in 1998.

=== Founders Building ===
Opened in February 2005, the Founders Building houses student apartments and the Angus Mitchell Library. The Founders Building was named in honor of the various groups and individuals who conceived the idea of establishing an International House in Melbourne and for those with a driving conviction and strong commitment that made it a reality. It is built on the site of the old International House squash courts, which existed at the site from 1969 to 2003.

=== Ida Scheps Wing (now the George Hicks Building) ===
Formerly known as the Ida Scheps Wing, the terrace house located at 19 –205 Royal Parade houses tutorial rooms and other informal study spaces. It was acquired by International House from the University of Melbourne in 1964. Until December 2014, it was named for the wife of donor Theodore Alexander Scheps.

=== George Hicks Building ===
The George Hicks Building was opened in January 2015 with the need to provide for graduate student accommodation. Planning began in 2009 and construction began in August 2013 on the site of the former multi-purpose court, which was relocated to the north-east corner of International House. It incorporates the former Ida Scheps Wing at 197 Royal Parade and provides 57 apartments, academic facilities and a café for use by the hall community.

== Heads of International House ==
Year	Head
1957–1959	Brian Jones
1960–1970	S.G. McL. Dimmick
1971–1972	Gilbert H. Vasey
1972–1981	John F. Hopkins
1982–1997	Robert M. Fels
1998–1999	Dr Brian Corbitt
2000–2003	Associate Professor Donald Stewart
2004–2014	Associate Professor Jane Munro AM
2015–2025	Dr Deborah Seifert AM
2026	Dr Eshan Arya (Acting until February) Dr Katherine Firth (Interim) - current

== Student life ==
International House has capacity for 283 undergraduate students, 56 graduate students and 17 residential academic staff. Nearly sixty percent of the students are international, from 51 countries. It consists of nine residential buildings with associated dining, educational and recreational facilities located within 1.5 hectares of gardens.

All International House students are a part of the two incorporated International House Student Clubs. The committee of these student clubs run most of the activities that take place at the hall.

=== Diversity ===
The largest single national group is Australian students who form around 40% of the population. International students living at the hall are from around 51 different countries. Approximately equal numbers of males and females studying a range of courses are accepted.

=== Angus Mitchell Library ===
The Angus Mitchell Library (also known at the International House Library) was named after the first Australian to become president of Rotary International (1948–1949).

=== Satadal ===
Satadal is the year book produced by International House students each year. The first Satadal was published in 1959, two years after the arrival of the first residents at International House. 'Satadal' is a Sanskrit word used to suggest unity in diversity, and harmony in multiformity because it means a hundred united petals of the Lotus.

=== Sporting activities ===
Sport is an important part of life at International House. Both undergraduate and graduate students participate in the University of Melbourne's Intercollegiate Sporting Program, including cricket, softball, squash, athletics, soccer, hockey, rowing, netball, AFL, volleyball, badminton, and swimming.

=== Thai Rural and Educational Development (TREAD) Program ===
The Thai Rural and Educational Development Program (formerly the Banana Project) is a development initiative run by students at International House in association with the Population and Community Development Association (PDA) in Thailand. As part of this program, students work to improve the living conditions, education and opportunities of people living in remote village in Thailand. The project was started by International House alumnus Khun Mechai Viravaidya.

=== Notable alumni ===
Khun Mechai Viravaidya http://www.mechaifoundation.org/

- Mr. Leigh Clifford
- The Hon Jenny Macklin

== Rotary involvement ==
Rotary has been a major supporter of International House since its beginning. The Rotary Club of Melbourne worked hard in the early 1950s to raise funds to establish the hall. Sir Angus Mitchell, President of Rotary International, had seen the value of International Houses overseas and encouraged the idea of establishing an International House in Victoria.

Robert Fels (Warden 1982–1997) established the Royce Abbey Room in the Grey Court Building, which provided a venue for Rotary meetings and ensured ongoing Rotary links. Now housed in the Hilda Stevenson Building, the room also showcases Royce Abbey's collection of memorabilia from his time as President of Rotary International from 1988 to 1989.

The Rotary clubs of Melbourne, Central Melbourne Sunrise, Altona, Gisborne, District 9800 and Rotary International have remained involved with International House through their support of Café International, fundraising, scholarships and through the donation of library and sporting equipment.
