= Philip Berber =

Irish businessman (born 1958)

- Born: 1958 (age 67–68); Dublin, Ireland
- Education: University College Dublin (B.Comm)
- Occupation: Entrepreneur
- Spouse: Donna Berber

Philip Berber is an Irish-born American technology entrepreneur, now engaged in philanthropy, international aid, social entrepreneurship and impact investing. He sold CyBerCorp, his online brokerage for day traders, to Charles Schwab for $488m in 2000. He and his wife Donna then formed and funded A Glimmer of Hope, pledging $100 million of Schwab stock to endow the foundation.

He is currently engaged with philanthropy in Austin - by way of Glimmer|Austin- supporting local innovate early-stage non profits and social ventures. Philip is also engaged with Berber Family Investments and BerberFam, their Family Office, and serves on the Glimmer Board.

== Early life ==
Berber was born in Dublin, Ireland in 1958. He attended Wesley College, Dublin and went to University College Dublin and studied Commerce (B Comm). He moved to London in 1979 and met his wife Donna a few years later. They moved to Houston, Texas in 1991, and to Austin in 1995 where they live with their three sons.

== Business recognition ==
Berber won the Entrepreneur of the Year award for Central Texas in 2000 and was a national finalist the same year. University College Dublin awarded him with the Outstanding Alumnus Award in 2009, and that year Wall Street Journal described Berber as the "real star at the Clinton Global Initiative".

== Giving ==
Berber is Chairman and co founder of A Glimmer of Hope, a family foundation and international NGO, formed and funded by Berber and his wife Donna in 2000.

BusinessWeek listed the Berbers at #40 amongst "the 50 most generous philanthropists" in 2002.

Barron's ranked the Berbers as sixth in the world on the list of "The 25 Best Givers" in 2009 and 7th in 2010.

The Berbers and Glimmer were featured in the book Richistan.

== Ventures ==
In 2011, Berber was involved at the early stages of Circuit of the Americas (COTA), which brought Formula One back to the US.
