= Ryan Hreljac =

Canadian activist

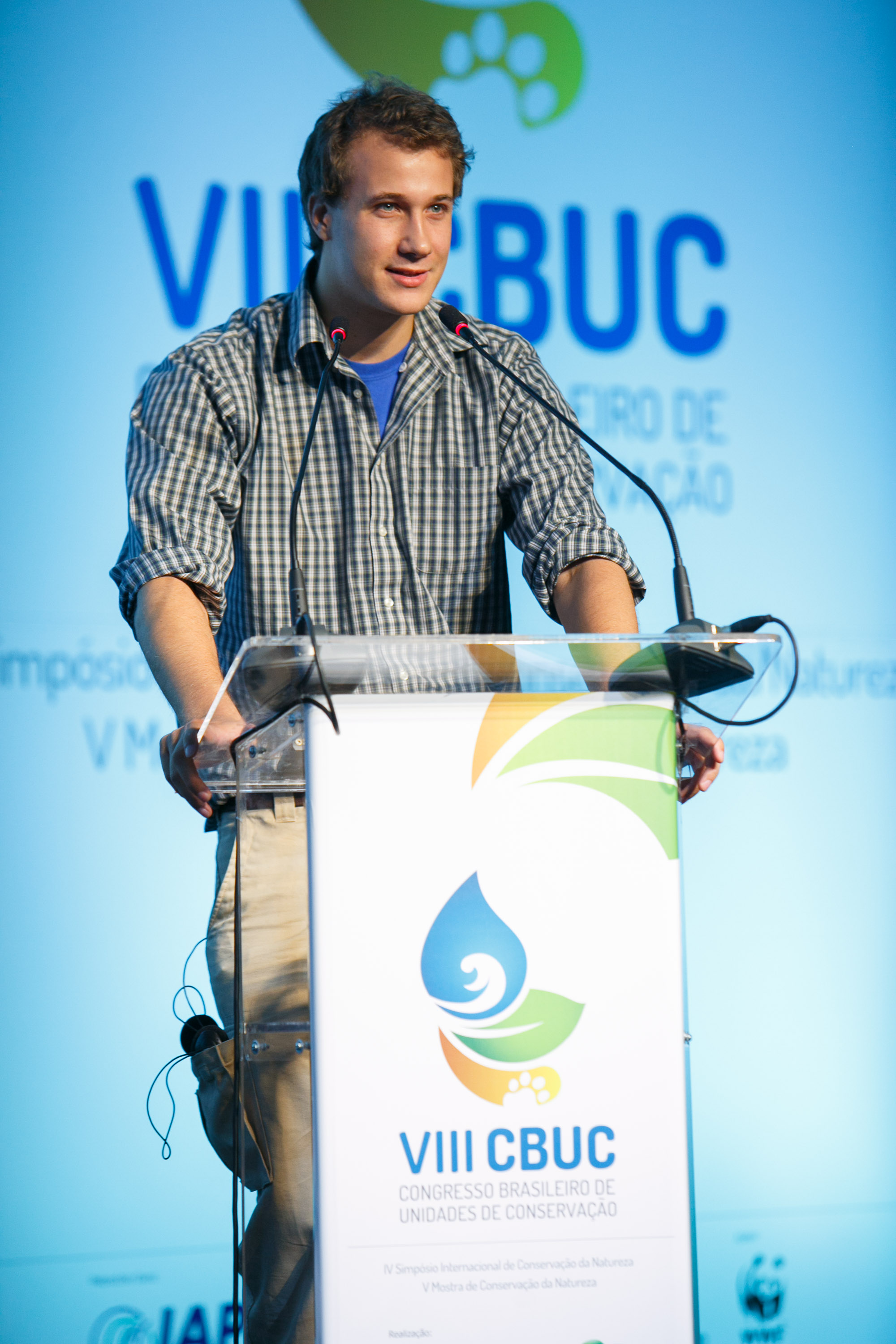
Ryan Hreljac speaking

Ryan Hreljac (/ˈhɜːrldʒæk/ HERL-jak) is a Canadian activist, who established the Ryan's Well Foundation to bring clean water and sanitation to people in developing countries. He has received numerous awards for his work, and he was the youngest person ever to be bestowed with the Order of Ontario.

== Early life and education ==
Hreljac is the son of Susan and Mark Hreljac of Kemptville, Ontario. He has three brothers: Keegan, Jordan and Jimmy (by adoption). Jimmy Akana was Hreljac's first pen pal from Uganda. Jimmy's parents disappeared during the country's civil war and he was raised by an aunt. He used to get up at midnight so that he could fetch water for his aunt before school. The two boys met during Hreljac's visit in 2000 to the Angolo Primary School in Uganda, where the first well that he funded was drilled. Jimmy was later abducted by a rebel group, Lord's Resistance Army, and then escaped to the home of an aid worker. The Hreljac family paid for his schooling for a couple of years and then brought him to Canada. Ryan and Jimmy both graduated from high school in June 2000. Ryan's family adopted Jimmy, and he became a Canadian citizen in 2007.

After his graduation from St. Michael's Catholic High School in Kemptville, Ontario, Hreljac graduated in 2013 from University of King's College in Halifax, Nova Scotia; his field of study was International Development and Political Science. Hreljac was employed by Youth Ottawa, a nongovernmental organization, after he graduated.

== Charitable fundraiser and activist ==
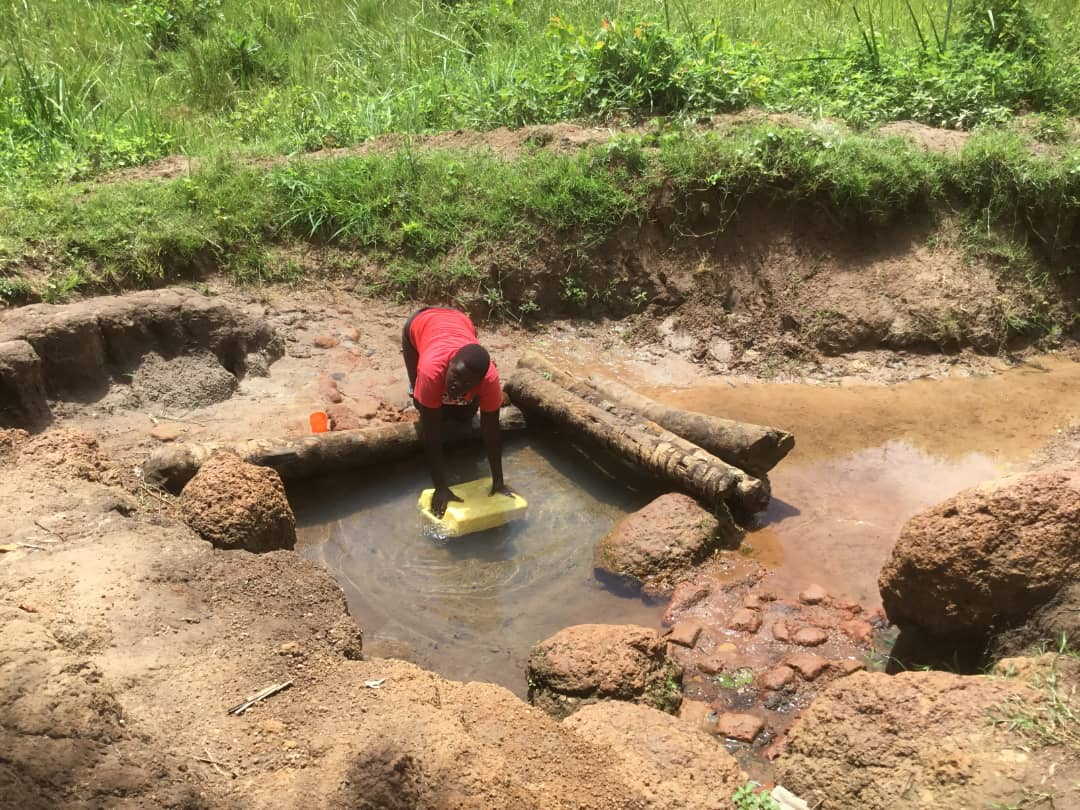
Collecting contaminated water from a source in project area, Uganda.

When he was six years old, Hreljac learned in school, during a lesson from his Grade One teacher, Nancy Prest, that many people in Africa have a very hard time getting access to clean water. Hreljac began raising money for those affected by the global water crisis by doing household chores, which netted him CA$70 over a four-month period. Doing more chores and fund-raising, within 12 months he had raised $2,000, which turned out to be the actual cost to build a well at that time, according to WaterCan, a non-profit organization that provides clean water to poor countries. In January 1999, he sent the money to WaterCan, who had the first well drilled in northern Uganda alongside Angolo Public School. It was built by the Canadian Physicians for Aid and Relief that year. In two years, he raised $61,000. The Canadian International Development Agency heard of Hreljac's efforts and matched $2 for every dollar that he raised. He told his story in many appearances in local and international media includingThe Oprah Winfrey Show.

In 2001, Hreljac founded Ryan's Well Foundation, a registered Canadian charity, to supply clean water in Africa and educate children about sanitation and safe water.

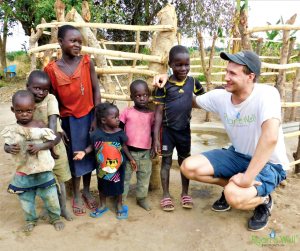
Ryan with children in project area in Uganda, August 2023.

The foundation's objective has expanded to build wells anywhere in the world. Millions of dollars have been raised for water and sanitation projects in Africa, Central America, and South Asia. According to the foundation, as of 2025, it has brought clean water to over 1.7 million people in 17 developing countries, through over 1,800 water and 1,300 sanitation projects. It has partners in 12 countries, including Burkina Faso, Ghana, Haiti, Kenya, Togo, and Uganda to identify the communities most in need of a water or sanitation project. It has worked with Rotary Clubs on well projects. By 2015, it completed 900 projects benefiting 824,038 people. Some of the projects were for rain harvesting tanks in areas—like Guatemala, Haiti, and India—where that was the optimal solution for safe water. The 1,000th well was dug in the fall of 2015 in northern Uganda, in a district neighboring the first well. Supporters of the foundation include Prince Charles, Matt Damon, Jane Goodall, and Oprah Winfrey.

Hreljac became assistant project manager at the foundation in January 2015, in preparation for a June 2015 opening for project manager. His on-the-job training included trips to Burkina Faso, Kenya, and Uganda to train locals how to maintain their wells. He has also traveled extensively—including Argentina, Brazil, Mexico, and Qatar—to speak about the foundation.

As of June 2023, Hreljac is executive director of the Ryan's Well Foundation, a position he has held since 2019. He still appears in media and presents to organizations and school classes worldwide.

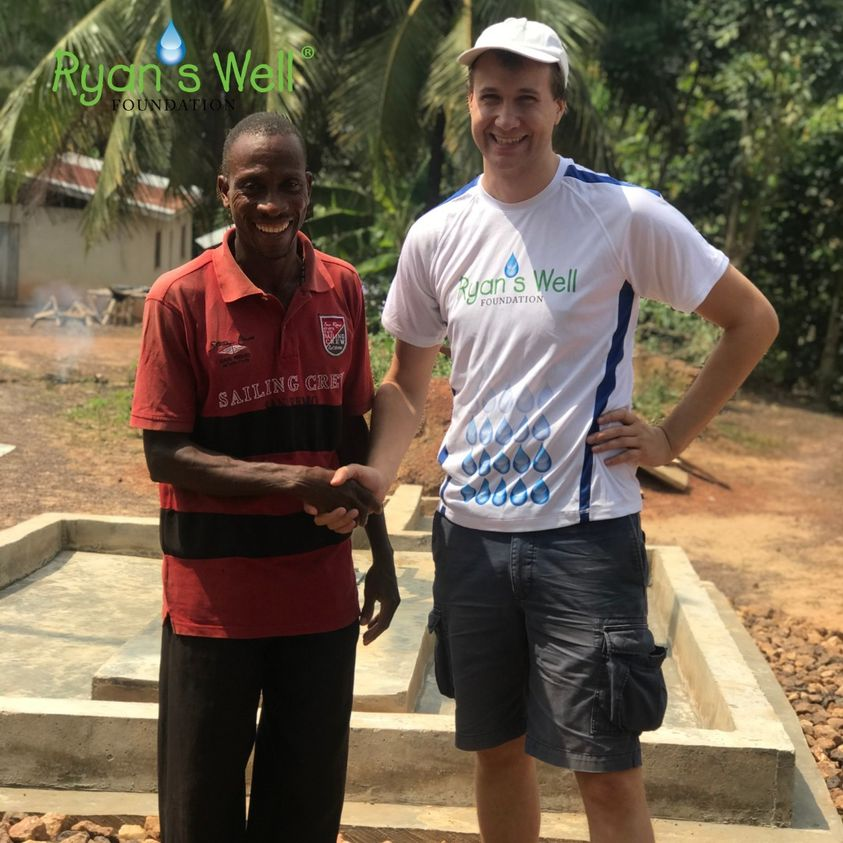
Ryan Hreljac with partner in Uganda, August 2023.

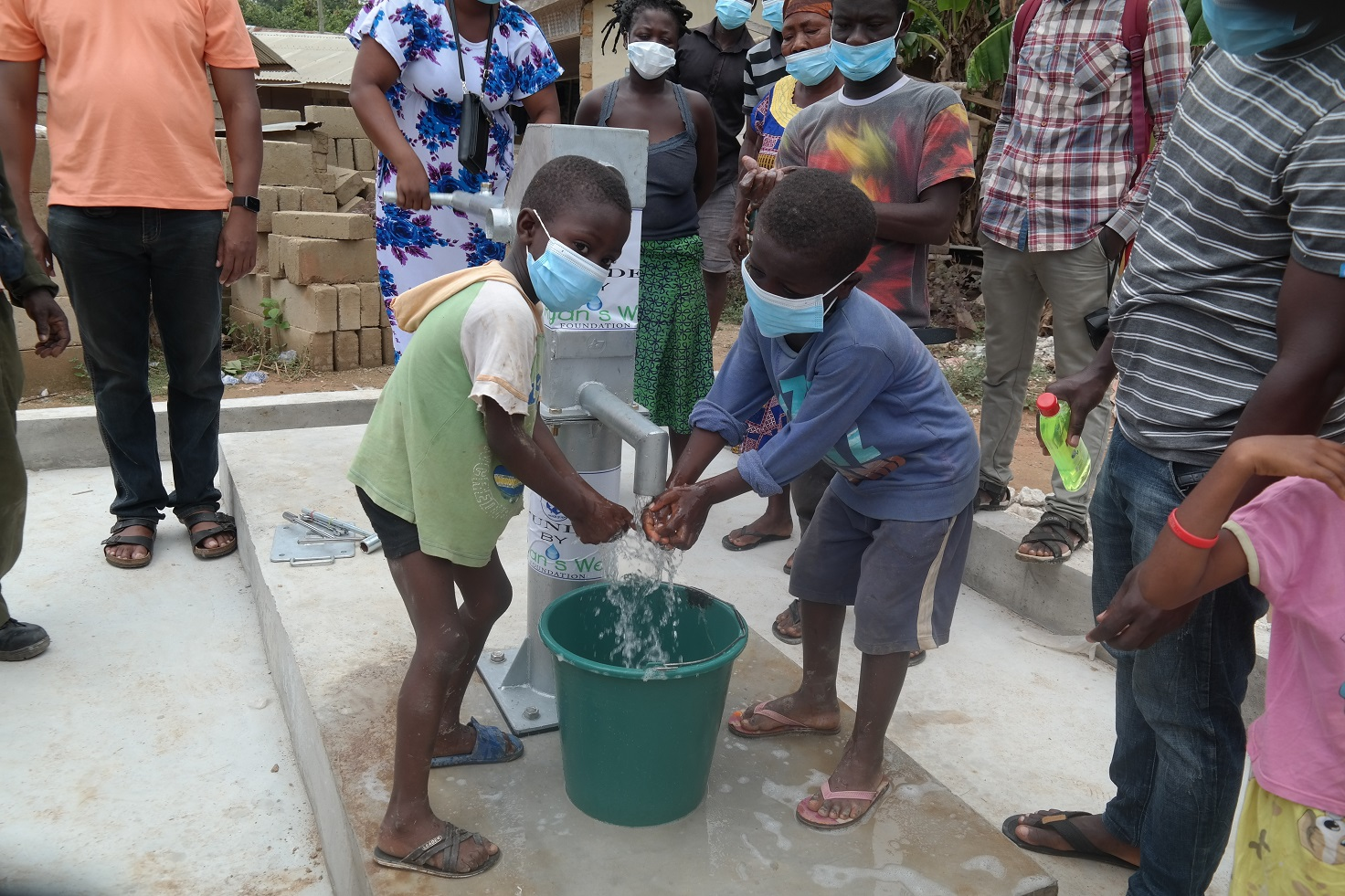
Children enjoying new, clean water source in Ghana.

== Recognition ==
Hreljac received the World of Children Awards in 2003, and a second time at the Montage Beverly Hills in April 2016 as an alumni winner. In 2004, he was named a Paul Harris Fellow. Hreljac was made a Lifesaver hero by The My Hero Project by late 2010.

He is the youngest person ever to receive the Order of Ontario. He has also been awarded the Canadian Meritorious Service Medal, the Duke of Edinburgh Gold Award, The Wolf Award, and Planet Africa's Nelson Mandela Humanitarian Award.

== In popular culture ==
=== Film ===
- Ryan's Well, directed by Lalita Krishna in 2001, tells the story of the first well.
- Blue Gold: World Water Wars, a documentary in 2008 in which Hreljac appears.
- Get Involved!, a television show in which Hreljac appears in 2008.
- Return to Ryan’s Well, a 2015 documentary, tells the story of Ryan Hreljac's return to his first well site at Angolo Primary School in Uganda and how the well changed the lives of the people in the area. The 27-minute film was also directed by Lalita Krishna. It was selected for the Planet in Focus Film Festival, one of the most significant environmental festivals that takes place in North America, that occurred in Toronto in October 2015.

=== Books ===
- The Water Princess is a book about a girl, Gie Gie, who walks with her mother each day to collect water. It is based upon the early life of Georgie Badiel, a model, who grew up in Burkina Faso. She established a foundation that partners with Ryan's Well Foundation to bring clean water to African communities.
