= Angels Sing =

- Directed by: Tim McCanlies
- Written by: Lou Berney
- Based on: When Angels Sing by Turk Pipkin
- Produced by: Elizabeth Avellán; Shannon McIntosh; Fred Miller
- Starring: Harry Connick Jr. Connie Britton; Chandler Canterbury; Fionnula Flanagan; Lyle Lovett; Willie Nelson; Kris Kristofferson
- Cinematography: Kamal Derkaoui
- Edited by: David Rosenblatt
- Music by: Carl Thiel; Scott Warren
- Production company: When Angels Sing
- Distributed by: Lionsgate
- Release dates: March 10, 2012 (United Kingdom); November 1, 2013 (United States)
- Running time: 90 minutes
- Country: United States
- Language: English

Angels Sing is a 2012 Christmas family drama film directed by Tim McCanlies and starring Harry Connick Jr., Connie Britton, Chandler Canterbury, Fionnula Flanagan, Lyle Lovett, Willie Nelson and Kris Kristofferson. It is an adaptation of Turk Pipkin's 1999 novel When Angels Sing.

== Plot ==
History professor Michael (Harry Connick Jr.) as a child loved Christmas, but as an adult is less than enthused about it. His family tries to get him, his wife and ten year old to also do Christmas with them at Thanksgiving, but he refuses.

Upset, his son David goes outside. There, Michael tells him the story of how he had his holiday spirit crushed. He and his brother David snuck out to go skating at the lake near their grandfather's. They suffered a tragic accident when they started racing. His brother realised the ice started to crack near the center, and he flung Michael to the edge, falling through himself.

Right after Michael and his wife are told the house they are renting has been sold, he has an accident mountain biking, caused by a reindeer, and is forced to walk his bike home. Seeing a house for sale, he stops and the owner Nick (Willie Nelson) invites him to come see it. Impulsively, he offers Michael the house for half of what it's worth, but under two conditions: Michael must accept immediately and upkeep it in line with the neighborhood.

As an adult, Michael still can't find the joy of Christmas, as he blamed himself for his big brother's death. So, their being barraged with carolers and holiday decorations upon their arrival, and for days and days makes him exasperated. He stockpiles them in the attic, as he refuses to put them up. Then, Michael's dad has a car accident while bringing David home. The child suffers a concussion, and his grandfather doesn't survive.

Michael's son David, facing the tragedy of his grandfather's death and blaming himself, motivates Michael to find his holiday spirit again. He gets a push in the right direction when he finds Nick again. He tells him that happy memories are the important ones. Michael seeks the help of his neighbor Griffin (Lyle Lovett) to help him decorate the house. Finally, David leaves his room, sees the lights and helps his dad turn them on. We see Michael's old home videos and see the face of Nick on the Santa he visits, the same who helps him find the joy of Christmas again.

== Cast ==
- Harry Connick Jr. as Michael Walker
- Connie Britton as Susan Walker
- Chandler Canterbury as David Walker
- Fionnula Flanagan as Ma
- Lyle Lovett as Griffin
- Willie Nelson as Nick
- Kris Kristofferson as The Colonel
- Dana Wheeler-Nicholson as Maggie
- Brennan Barker as Young Michael Walker
- Deborah Cole as Theresa
- Sara Hickman as Aunt Claire

== Soundtrack ==
Track list

Angels Sing

Soundtrack album by Various Artists
- Released: December 17, 2013
- Genre: Film soundtrack

No.	Title	Artist(s)	Length
1.	"Up On the Housetop"	Black Soot	2:11
2.	"Mistletoe on Death Row"	Dale Watson	1:58
3.	"Deck the Halls"	The Trishas	0:56
4.	"Christmas Time Is Here"	Kat Edmonson & Lyle Lovett with Mitch Watson	2:23
5.	"Family Bible"	Willie Nelson with Bobbie Nelson	3:01
6.	"Signals In the Dark"	Sahara Smith	3:41
7.	"Moses"	The Trishas	3:43
8.	"Christmas Time in Texas"	Dale Watson	3:54
9.	"Christmas Love"	Miss Lavelle with Guy Forsyth and Carolyn Wonderland	2:32
10.	"Silent Night"	Carolyn Wonderland and Guy Forsyth	1:17
11.	"Amazing Grace"	Willie Nelson with Bobbie Nelson	3:32
12.	"When I'm Home"	Harry Connick Jr. and Willie Nelson	3:30

== See also ==
- List of Christmas films
