= Monterey Media =

American video company

Monterey Media Inc.
- Company type: Independent film distributor
- Industry: Independent motion pictures distributor, DVD, Blu-ray
- Founded: 1979
- Founder: Scott Mansfield
- Headquarters: 125 Auburn Court #220, Westlake Village, California, United States
- Products: Films
- Owner: BayView Entertainment
- Website: greysshackfilms.com

Monterey Media Inc. (formerly The Monterey Movie Company) is an American independent film distribution company founded in 1979 by Scott Mansfield.

The company also had a home video company named Monterey Video in 1982, and was initially financed by Noel C. Bloom, and the titles were distributed by the Family Home Entertainment subsidiary of Caballero Control Corporation. Monterey is the second sub-label of NCB Entertainment, after FHE.

In 1987, Len Levy moved to Fries Home Video, an upstart distributor, taking its Monterey line with them, after cutting ties with International Video Entertainment, which received all 53 titles after five years. That year, in October, the Monterey Movie Company had signed a 22-title agreement with Forum Home Video, to launch its new Phoenix Video label and Scott Mansfield will provide the package, with Forum Home Video handling U.S. distribution of its titles, and the cassettes would range from $19.98-34.98.

After many years the company has now expanded from home video into independent theatrical distribution, film festivals, and other venues including television, digital delivery, and home entertainment markets.

Its first release was Deadly Games, a film made by Mansfield, who then released more titles under the Monterey label; early releases included a Dorsey Burnette tribute concert, a Sandahl Bergman aerobic dance video, Dynamite Chicken, a concert by The Tubes, Oh, Alfie!, The Werewolf of Washington, Can She Bake a Cherry Pie?, And Nothing But the Truth, Tomorrow, The Children of Sanchez, and Autumn Born. The company was also the exclusive distributor for All Grateful Dead concert videos/ DVDs for over 20 years, including The Grateful Dead Movie and Dead Ahead.

Currently, they distribute their films at festivals and events, in theaters, and on DVD and VOD, including feature films, documentaries, self-help videos, and PBS programs.

In 2019, Monterey was acquired by BayView Entertainment.

== Selected theatrical releases ==
Title	Release date
This Is Martin Bonner	August 14, 2013
Big Muddy	January 23, 2015
3 Nights in the Desert	February 6, 2015
Like Sunday, Like Rain	March 13, 2015
The Living	April 3, 2015
Childless	May 15, 2015
Runoff	June 26, 2015
Forever	September 25, 2015
Cut Snake	October 7, 2015
Sex, Death and Bowling	November 6, 2015
Yosemite	January 1, 2016
Of Mind and Music	February 12, 2016
Burning Bodhi	March 11, 2016
Memoria	April 8, 2016
A Beautiful Now	September 16, 2016
The Last Film Festival	September 16, 2016
No Pay, Nudity	November 11, 2016
A Month of Sundays	N/A 2016
Sophie and the Rising Sun	January 27, 2017
I Am Battle Comic	March 24, 2017
The Levelling	March 24, 2017
Looking for Grace	N/A 2017
The Sun at Midnight	N/A 2018

- 10 Questions for the Dalai Lama
- Childless (2015)
- A Farewell to Fools (2014)
- Approaching Midnight (2013)
- A Beautiful Now (2015)
- Between Us (2012)
- The Blue Butterfly
- Bracelet of Bordeaux (2009)
- Bringing Up Bobby (2012)
- Canopy (2013)
- The Cellar Door (2008)
- The Citizen (2013)
- The Cry (2008)
- Endgame (2010)
- The Endless Summer (1966)
- Eye of the Dolphin (2007)
- Girl on a Bicycle (2014)
- The Girl on the Train (2013)
- Gooby (2009)
- Half of a Yellow Sun (2014)
- Harvest (2011)
- Hey Hey It's Esther Blueburger (2010)
- Home (2009)
- How to Be a Serial Killer (2009)
- Humble Pie (2007)
- I Am Comic (2010)
- I Kissed a Vampire (2012)
- Karla (2007)
- Keyhole (2012)
- The Kitchen (2012)
- Leonie (2013)
- The Lesser Blessed (2009)
- Local Color (2009)
- Looking for Palladin (2011)
- Lovely, Still (2012)
- Meadowoods (2010)
- No God, No Master (2014)
- Nobelity (2006)
- One Peace at a Time (2009)
- Peel: The Peru Project (2006)
- The Red Baron (2008)
- Redwood Highway (2014)
- Restitution (2011)
- Ripple Effect (2007)
