= Al Reinert =

American film director (1947–2018)

- Born: Albert John Reinert; 1947; Tokyo, Japan
- Died: December 31, 2018 (aged 71); Wimberley, Texas, U.S.
- Education: Texas A&M University
- Occupations: Journalist, director, producer, screenwriter
- Years active: 1973–2018
- Spouse: Lisa Hart Carroll (m. 1989)

Al Reinert (1947 – December 31, 2018) was an American journalist, film director, screenwriter and producer. He co-wrote the screenplays for the Ron Howard film Apollo 13 and Final Fantasy: The Spirits Within, but is best known for directing and producing For All Mankind, an award-winning 1989 documentary about NASA's Apollo program. He died of lung cancer at his home in Wimberley, Texas on December 31, 2018.

== Early life ==
Reinert was born in Tokyo, Japan to American parents. He went to high school in Fort Worth, Texas and attended West Point for a year before dropping out with the aim of playing professional baseball. On a scholarship to Texas A&M, Reinert played ball and studied geology. When the lure of pro sports subsided, he turned his attention to student government, winning the college's student body presidency. His grade point average, however, was too low for him to serve. In 2024, the Former Journalism Students Association of A&M inducted him posthumously into its Hall of Honor. A plaque of Reinert hangs in the newsroom of The Battalion, Texas A&M's student newspaper.

After graduation, Reinert moved to Houston. In 1972, he was arrested on a marijuana charge. As part of his probation, Reinert was required to have steady employment. Although he had no experience in journalism, he convinced the Houston Chronicle's city editor to hire him as the night police beat reporter, a task he later characterized as "the lowest ranking job you could have as a reporter at The Chronicle or any newspaper."

== Journalism career ==
Reinert was a natural journalist. He soon worked his way up from crime reporting to covering politics, but his own left-leaning political views put him at odds with the newspaper's management. He was fired within a year. Shortly after the dismissal, William Broyles Jr., the founding editor of Texas Monthly, hired Reinert as a contributing editor for the new magazine.

Reinert's first story for Texas Monthly (So Long, Cosmic Cowboys, March 1973) was a nostalgic take on the heyday of NASA's human lunar landing Apollo program. The article set the tone for much of Reinert's future career. Other notable stories for the Texas-based magazine were Closing Down La Grange, a tribute to the Chicken Ranch, the "Oldest Continually Operating Non-Floating Whorehouse in the United States;" Billy Lee, an ode to the brilliant, but drug-addicted, political writer and staffer Billy Lee Brammer; and The Secret World of Walter Cronkite, a day in the life of "the most trusted man in America." The Chicken Ranch article was reprinted by The Washington Post.

Reinert also contributed to Rolling Stone, Esquire and The New York Times Magazine. For a brief time he served as press secretary to the flamboyant Texas Congressman Charlie Wilson.

== Film career ==
=== For All Mankind ===
Reinert's interest in space exploration led to the ambitious project For All Mankind. Although he had no film experience, his goal was to bring images previously seen only on television to film. It would take Reinert eight years to finish the documentary. He spent hundreds of hours interviewing former astronauts and culled through thousands of hours of NASA footage. To scale up the space agency's images, Reinert had to use an optical printer to scan each individual frame of the original 16mm film and enlarge it to 35mm. Brian Eno was commissioned to provide a soundtrack, which was combined with sound bites from the astronauts in a narration-free film.

The documentary received high praise. New York Post critic David Edelstein wrote, "It amounts to an ode to space travel, and it's awesomely beautiful." For All Mankind received an Academy Award nomination for Best Documentary Feature. It won the Grand Jury Prize for Best Documentary at the Sundance Film Festival.

=== Apollo 13 (1995) ===
In the mid-1990s, Reinert teamed up with his former editor Bill Broyles to write the screenplay for the space docudrama Apollo 13. Directed by Ron Howard and starring Tom Hanks, the movie dramatizes the aborted 1970 lunar mission. In 1996, the film was nominated for nine Oscars, including Best Adapted Screenplay, but Broyles' and Reinert's effort lost to Emma Thompson's work on Sense and Sensibility.

Reinert eventually moved to Los Angeles to continue his screen writing career. He would spend 15 years there. Projects included a two-year stint on an unrealized James Cameron movie about Mars, an uncredited rewrite on the 1998 film Armageddon and preliminary work on the 2013 film Gravity. He co-wrote and shared an Emmy Award for the 1998 HBO miniseries From the Earth to the Moon. During this time frame, Reinert also traveled to Japan, where he co-wrote the screenplay for the video game-to-film Final Fantasy: The Spirits Within.

=== An Unreal Dream: The Michael Morton Story ===
Tired of Los Angeles' "dehumanizing" film industry, Reinert sought a project that would take him back to Texas. The result was his first feature documentary since For All Mankind. The 2013 film, An Unreal Dream: The Michael Morton Story, told the tale of the wrongful conviction of a Williamson County man charged with murdering his wife. Morton spent nearly 25 years in prison before he was exonerated through DNA evidence. The documentary debuted at the SXSW Festival, where it won the Documentary Spotlight Audience Award. It was later picked up by CNN Films.

=== Audubon (2016) ===
In 2016, Reinert's film Audubon was released. Also known as Rara Avis: John James Audubon and the Birds of America, the documentary tells the story of John James Audubon, the 19th century ornithologist, naturalist and self-taught painter. It shows various locations in Audubon's life and interviews experts about his contributions to ornithology and the impact his art had on how nature was viewed. Reinert took the film across the U.S. where he showed it in private screenings at Audubon Society meetings and museums. The Public Broadcasting Service (PBS) has since aired the documentary several times and sells it in DVD format through the PBS website.

=== Above It All ===
At the time of his death, Reinert was working on another space-based documentary, Above It All, about the International Space Station. A sponsored project of the International Documentary Association, the yet-to-be-finished film is described as a "profound example of human cooperation...circling our planet every day. Men and women from 24 countries have flown on the International Space Station, living together in outer space for months at a time. Not only peacefully but constructively, resolutely pursuing a shared dream. It is the model for a hopeful human future, and Above It All is an effort to tell the story."

== Personal life ==
Reinert married the actress Lisa Hart Carroll in 1989. She is best known for her role as Patsy in the 1983 film Terms of Endearment.

Reinert lived in Central Texas. He died from lung cancer at his home in Wimberley, Texas on December 31, 2018.

== Awards and nominations ==
1989 International Documentary Association

- Won – IDA Award – For All Mankind

1989 Sundance Film Festival

- Won – Audience Award, Documentary – For All Mankind
- Won – Grand Jury Prize, Documentary – For All Mankind

1990 Academy Awards

- Nominated – Best Documentary, Features – For All Mankind (shared with Betsy Broyles Breier)

1996 Academy Awards

- Nominated – Best Writing, Screenplay Based on Material Previously Produced or Published – Apollo 13 (shared with William Broyles, Jr.)

1996 PEN Center USA West Literary Awards

- Won – Literary Award, Screenplay – Apollo 13 (shared with William Broyles, Jr.)

1996 USC Scripter Award

- Nominated – Apollo 13 (Shared with William Broyles, Jr.)

1996 Writers Guild of America, USA Awards

- Nominated – Best Screenplay Based on Material Previously Produced or Published – Apollo 13 (shared with William Broyles, Jr.)

2013 SXSW Film Festival

- Won – Audience Award – An Unreal Dream: The Michael Morton Story

== See also ==
- For All Mankind
- Apollo 13
