= Population and Community Development Association =

Non-governmental organization in Thailand

The Population and Community Development Association (PDA) is a non-governmental organization in Thailand. Its goal is to reduce poverty through both development initiatives and family planning programs. Originally called the Community-Based Family Planning Service, it was founded by Mechai Viravaidya in 1974. In the early 1970s, Viravaidya was the Minister of Industry but became frustrated with the government's inability to implement a national family planning policy. In his work with the government, he identified a direct correlation between Thailand's poverty and population growth. His immediate concern was the high population growth rate of 3.2%, which equated to approximately seven children per family. The population growth rate was an increasing concern for Thailand and Mechai Viravaidya because high growth rates restricted Thailand's ability to provide for its entire population and improve living conditions. By 2011, Thailand's population growth rate was only 0.566%. A sharp reduction in poverty has followed upon the reduction in family size, a reduction which can in significant part be attributed to the influence and programs of the PDA.

The Population and Community Development Association has concentrated on reaching rural towns and villages with family planning and development programs. It has operated on the belief that “local people are best suited to shape and sustain their own development.” Most of its programs empower communities on a micro level, utilizing a “bottom up” approach. As of 2009, the PDA had 18 regional centers which ran development programs in one-third of the country. Today, the organization consists of over 800 employees and 12,000 volunteers and is one of Thailand's most expansive and diverse NGOs.

Initially, the PDA sought to reduce population growth by focusing on efforts both to combat child mortality and to encourage family planning. Viravaidya deduced that family planning would not be widely adopted in Thailand if children did not survive. Therefore, his solution to controlling population growth, which was at 3.3%, was to target maternal and child healthcare. At the same time, the PDA made various methods of birth control accessible to rural populations. The PDA discovered that birth control pills were used by only 20% of the population because getting them required access to medical personnel. To target the remaining 80% of the country, the PDA invested in multiple initiatives - including the popularization of free condoms, increased access to birth control, incentives for women to not become pregnant, and slogans to encourage smaller families.

The Thai family planning programs met notable success. By 2015, total fertility had dropped to 1.5 children per woman. Following on the drop in unwanted fertility, the poverty rate dropped sharply; from 32.4% in 2003 10.9% in 2013.

== Mission and purpose ==
The original mission of the Population and Community Association was to supplement the efforts of the Thai government to reduce poverty by promoting family planning. To accomplish this, the PDA has focused on targeting remote rural communities where government outreach has not been viable. Realizing that a high population growth rate is a barrier to economic development, the PDA's focus has been on implementing family planning programs to lower the population growth rate. It has sought to do so through community-based, participatory approaches to educate and empower village residents. Since its inception, the program mission has expanded to include rural development and the improvement of overall health conditions. Engaging in a "people-centered approach," the PDA has worked to empower communities to identify its own needs and then work to improve conditions based on those needs - a form of self-help. Today, the PDA works to address a multitude of issues that affect poverty levels. Some of these activities include: health care, HIV/AIDS services and awareness, access to clean water resources, reliable means of income, environmental conservation, gender equality, youth education and services, democratic engagement, and small-scale business initiatives, including village owned banks providing micro-credit loans.

== Founder ==
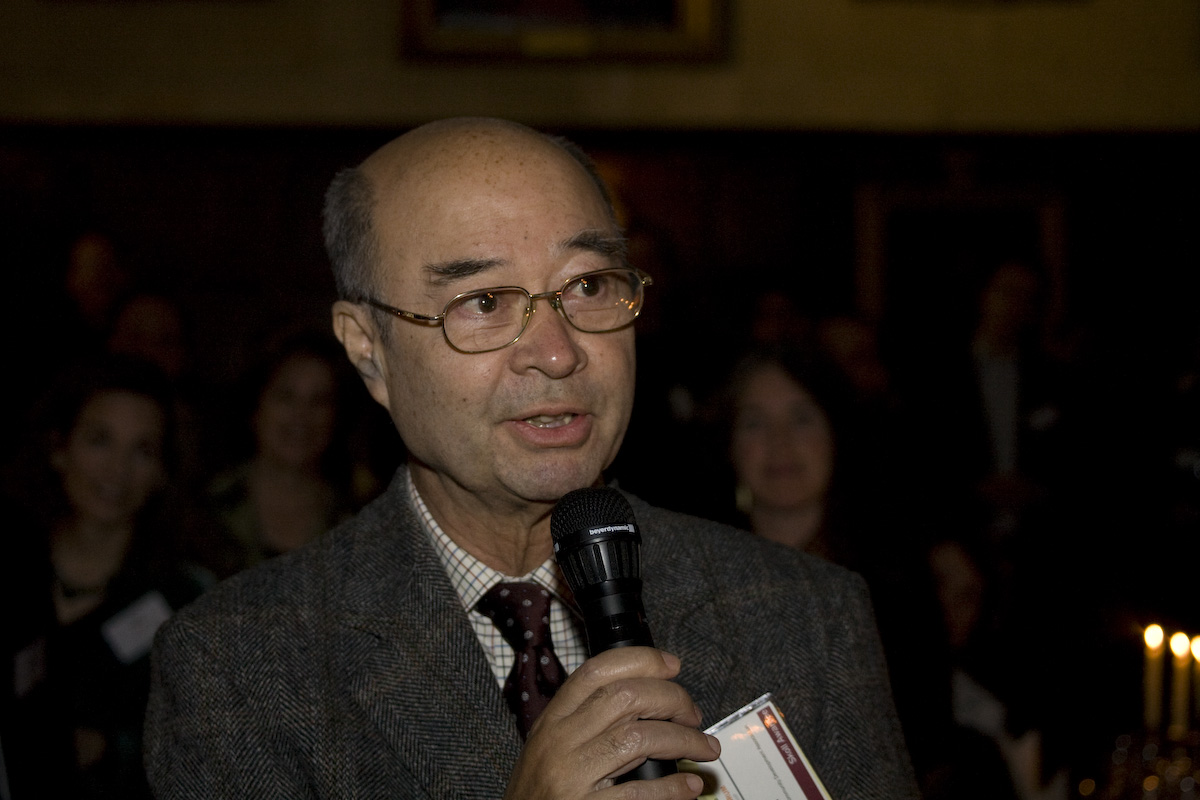
Mechai Viravaidya in 2008

Mechai Viravaidya founded the Population and Community Development Association in 1974, at which time it was named the Community-Based Family Planning Service. He began his work with rural communities in Thailand in 1965 when he returned to Thailand from studying at the University of Melbourne in Australia. After studying he got a job working for the National Economic and Social Development Board and later became the Minister of Industry. As part of his job, Mechai Viravaidya spent time visiting rural areas of Thailand. Relative to other government officials, he spent a lot of time in discussion with villagers and farmers. Viravaidya then began writing a weekly column that was published in a Bangkok newspaper. He also taught at Thammasat University and had a nightly radio show during the same time period. Later he played a leading role on a television soap opera series. These experiences helped him gain the attention of the media and the support of a wide variety of audiences. When the Thai government created a national family planning policy, Viravaidya worked as secretary-general of the Family Planning Association of Thailand for two years. Viravaidya then switched to the non-profit sector when he founded the CBFPS in 1974. Today, Viravaidya continues to work as chairman of the PDA.

== Timeline ==
The Population and Community Development Association was established in 1976 as a response to the need for a diversified approach to poverty reduction in Thailand. Originally the organization was called the Community-Based Family Planning Service (CBFPS) which was established in 1974. Two years later, the CBFPS became a sub-agency within the PDA. Several other sub-agencies and separate associations have been created since then:

1974 - established as the Community-Based Family Planning Service (CBFPS)

1975 - Population & Development Company (PDC) created as a separate business to fulfill fundraising needs

1976 - CBFPS renamed as the Population and Community Development Association (PDA)

1978 - Community-Based Appropriate Technology Development Services (CBATDS) created as a sub-agency

1978 - Asian Center for Population & Community Development (ACPD) established as a separate international organization

1979 - Community-Based Emergency Relief Services (CBERS) created as a sub-agency

1979 - Community Based Integrated Rural Development (CBIRD) created a sub-agency

1983 - Community-Based Incentives-Thailand (CBIT) created as a sub-agency

1983 - Population and Development International (PDI) established as a separate organization

1984 - Rural Small Scale Industries (RSSI) Company was created as a separate business

1989 - The Thai Business Initiative in Rural Development (TBIRD) created as a sub-agency

== Funding ==
The PDA is funded through several different sources. Most of its funding comes from international donors, other NGOs and foundations, private sector businesses and foreign governments. The establishment of the original organization was funded by the International Planned Parenthood Federation. However, as the organization grew it diversified its funding and currently does not rely solely on international donors for continuous aid. Instead it has utilized various methods to work towards financial self-sustainability. In 1975, Viravaidya received a loan which he used to start a business that is legally separate from the PDA. This business has expanded into 16 separate companies under the Population and Community Development Company Ltd. These companies complement the work of the PDA by providing services such as health and medicine supplies and affordable restaurant food with a condom theme (known as Cabbages and Condoms). The profits from these companies are then used to help offset the PDA costs. Also, it can be used to supplement funds when donor aid is limited and to expand existing PDA services and programs. In the past, funds from these separate businesses have accounted for as much as 70% of required financing to maintain existing PDA activity. As a response to an overall decline of foreign development aid, the Thai Business Initiative for Rural Development (TBIRD) was created in 1989.

== Strategies ==
The Population and Community Development Association has used many different strategies to promote its programs. Often the strategies are considered unique or creative. Some of these strategies include:

Efforts to make condoms more accessible & remove the stigma associated with them, like

- Holding condom balloon blowing competitions
- Creating a Captain Condom mascot
- Making condoms available at associated Cabbages & Condoms restaurants in lieu of mints
- Educating children in school
- Having Buddhist monks sprinkle holy water on condoms
- Overseeing a "Condom is the Girl's Best Friend" campaign
- Having police officers distribute condoms in a "Cops and Rubbers" program

Encouraging vasectomies by

- Making donations into a community fund for every vasectomy performed
- Holding a vasectomy lunch for Americans in Thailand

Increasing the availability of birth control pills

- By utilizing floating markets to provide contraceptives/birth control pill
- By training of local shopkeepers to prescribe birth control pill

Educating the population about HIV/AIDS

- By using of military radio stations

Encouraging development

- By making micro-loans available to general villagers at relatively low interest rates, especially for villages that use contraceptives
- By creating village banks operated by (mostly) women within the village community

== Relationship with Thai government ==
Throughout its existence, the PDA has involved the government of Thailand in its activities. Viravaidya largely attributes the success of the PDA in reducing population growth in Thailand to the strong cooperation between the non-profit sector and the government.

In 1971 the Thai government instituted a national family planning policy. Viravaidya was the secretary-general in the National Family Planning Association of Thailand, which worked to implement the government created policy. However, its impact was limited and Virvaidya went on to form the organization Community-Based Family Planning Service (CBFPS) in 1974, which later became incorporated under the broader PDA.

Overall, the government has been supportive of the PDA and its programs. Before beginning a new program or spreading to a new town, the PDA consults with the local government agency. It partners with the government in order to target and serve rural communities that the government does not have the capacity reach. Furthermore, the reduction in Thailand's population growth rate has largely been aided by the government's efforts to establish and maintain a national family planning policy. Also, the Ministry of Public Health adopted family planning into its national health service and led the way for the distribution of contraceptives by non-physicians. Both the PDA and the public acknowledge the successes of the Thai government and the National Family Planning Program in aiding family planning services.

== Services ==
=== Women's health and maternity ===
Empowering women's reproductive health ultimately advocates for eliminating gender inequalities. This increases women's socio-economic participation, consequently alleviating poverty in developing states. The PDA recognized that educating women on family planning and reproductive health created the following benefits: providing women the agency to make decisions about family planning, improving couples communication, and modifying sexual behaviors.

The PDA encourages smaller families given that the benefits have direct economic repercussions. Families can reallocate resources previously spent on providing for their dependents and increase their savings. This additional income thereby becomes more likely to be invested in the health and education of their children. Additionally, women are more likely to join the paying work force if they are not restricted to the home and childcare. Given women's influence capacity within the home and community, the PDA tailors its family planning initiatives toward women.

== Unwanted pregnancies ==
Until February 2021, abortion was illegal with severe offense and punishment if convicted. Only in extremely rare cases were women permitted to have an abortion with no offense. Consequently, there were no professional clinics available to provide safe services for unwanted pregnancies for Thai women. A study published by the Population Council of New York released the following statistic: in 1978, 310,000 induced abortions occurred in Thailand at a rate of 37 abortions for every 1,000 women between the ages of 15 and 44. This statistic could be attributed to Thai women's restricted access to contraceptives, resources/services, and basic information regarding family planning. Due to the legal consequences, women turned to doctors operating illegally and "back alley" operations to terminate unwanted pregnancies. Many women who sought out these means of abortion died directly from the procedure or later from contracted complications and infections.

Mechai and the PDA acknowledged the growing need for safe services and information in regards to unwanted pregnancies. However, the PDA faced two major dilemmas in providing such resources – financing such an initiative and operating within the law. The solution was a loan of one million baht from International Pregnancy Advisory Service (IPAS) endorsing a separate legal entity, a comprehensive clinic, from the PDA.

The clinic provides safe services to terminate pregnancies and is operated by professional staff. The PDA is able to organize this clinic under a protective policy, which permits such services within legal safety boundaries. Couples are counseled and thoroughly informed of family planning practices. Contraceptives are advised and supplied. This clinic enables choice for women – no abortive procedures may be done without complete consent from the woman.

Thai women were previously unable to obtain safe termination services mostly due to financial restrictions. The PDA recognizes this constraint and actively works to make the clinic accessible for everyone that requires its services. Charges for abortion procedures are minimal or negotiable depending on the recipient and her specific circumstances. The medical professional staff offers their time and services at a reasonable hourly rate rather than by procedure. For women whom cannot afford the procedure not access to the clinic, the PDA offers to cover both their services and transportation fees to and from the clinic. The clinic does not profit monetarily from its services and clientele. Any additional revenue generated is either put towards repaying the IPAS loan or investing into the clinic itself. The PDA is committed to making termination procedures, counseling, information, and contraceptives widely accessible and affordable for everyone, especially women.

In 1982, a second clinic was opened in Chiang Rai. This was the first operation of its kind to be located in Thailand's rural provinces. In 1985, Bangkok opened two clinics, but these were eventually shut down in 1987. In 1989, two more clinics were established, one in Chiang Mai and the other in Nakhon Ratchasima. The most recent clinic was created in Phitsanuloke in 2002.

=== HIV and AIDS ===
In September 1984, Thailand reported its first case of AIDS. Unlike the common stigmatized association of AIDS with homosexual communities, HIV/AIDS in developing nations is also a heterosexual problem. In Thailand, individuals at risk for HIV/AIDS were exposed to the virus via their husbands, by continual sex partners, or by the sex trade industry. Thailand identified six main high-risk groups for contracting HIV/AID: homosexuals, injecting drug users (IUDs), sex workers, individuals receiving blood transfusions, other heterosexuals, and infants whose mothers are HIV carriers.

At the onset of the AIDS epidemic, Thailand was ranked second only to Africa in its number of reported AIDS cases. In 1997, UNAIDS (United Nations Program on HIV/AIDS) and the World Health Organization (WHO) released the following statistics:

- 770,000 adults and 14,000 children in Thailand were reported HIV-positive
- predictions forecast that 30 of 10,000 children have lost either their mother or both parents to AIDS by 1999

The PDA released additionally alarming statistics about the spread of HIV and the growing prevalence of AIDS in Thailand: the percentage of HIV positives in the Thai population was at 4% in December 1987 and by September 1988 had risen to 43% (a span of nine months)

The Thai government did not address the AIDS epidemic. Mechai Viravaidya believed that the government's lack of influence and assistance in the AIDS epidemic within Thailand required action by someone. Viravaidya assigned himself and the PDA to the task of addressing the HIV/AIDS and called upon everyone in the nation to become involved. The PDA believes that the affected population group is fully capable of advocating for themselves if given the enabling resources and support by all sectors of Thai society.

The PDA addressed the AIDS epidemic with a three part strategy:

- Create and circulate educational materials to communicate with the masses
- Educate other similar organization to PDA to enact parallel strategies to fight and treat AIDS
- Advocacy

In 1987, the PDA launched an educational strategy to increase awareness of AIDS in Thailand. The PDA constructed five target groups: government officials, community leaders, youths, commercial sex workers, and women. The underlying initiative of the educational awareness launch was to enable and empower the target groups to advocate behavioral changes in Thailand to avoid infecting the entire population. In 1990, Viravaidya released a statement remarking, “We [Thailand] have no high risk groups, we only have high risk nationality.”

Since the onset of the AIDS epidemic in Thailand, the PDA has established 45 initiatives to educate and prevent HIV/AIDS. The PDA takes the position of HIV/AIDS as a behavioral issue within Thai society rather than an infectious disease. From this standpoint, the PDA adopts an advocate model for its fight against HIV/AIDS, thereby encouraging empowerment for at risk individuals to secure their own health through positive sexual behaviors and practices. The implementation of these programs has had enormous benefits for the Thai population. The United Nations reported that new cases of HIV had been reduced by 90%. The World Bank reported 7.7 million lives were saved. The PDA reported that their total spent funds on the HIV/AIDS campaign is 62,329,590 Baht.

Viravaidya and the PDA turned to the Royal Thai Army for support where the government was unwilling and unable in their HIV/AIDS campaign. The government receives criticism for its passive actions towards the sex tourism industry, where HIV/AIDS is prevalent and most likely to spread. The military was cooperative with Viravaidya and the PDA's requests to utilize its broadcasting capacity to reach the masses. The Army permitted the PDA the use of 326 radio stations to broadcast nationwide a three-year HIV/AIDS educational campaign. The Army then took an even more active role in the fight against AIDS by removing the stigma from HIV positive recruits by permitting a continuation of service within the Army for HIV positive soldiers.

The PDA created the Corporate Education Program to incorporate the business sector into their HIV/AIDS campaign. The enrollment for this initiative is over 100 companies. The PDA trains and educates personnel from different companies about HIV/AIDS. These representatives then relay the training back to their own companies and provide resources and information to HIV positive employees. The PDA asks participating companies to utilize their networks to further spread information and advocacy for the prevention of HIV/AIDS.

The PDA's most widely accessible initiative is its Mobile Anonymous HIV Testing Clinic. It provides free HIV and STD testing by public health-care providers. Additionally, it provides counseling services for infected and/or affected individuals. PDA has touring buses equipped with TVs and information handouts. These buses constantly play clips about education, prevention, and agency for HIV/AIDS – thereby eliminating any barriers of communication for illiteracy and low socio-economic individuals.

A large and publicized component of the PDA's HIV/AIDS campaign is Viravaidya's initiative to desensitize the condom. The rationale behind the condom movement is that if Thai society can widely accept the advocacy of condoms then individuals would be actively supporting positive sexual behaviors and practices. The PDA and Viravaidya support advocacy of the condom for all ages because it is viewed as a generational issue. Parents and teachers do not object to integrating condoms and HIV/AIDS instruction into all levels of education, since such programs are saving lives. See more under PDA strategy.

The HIV/AIDS epidemic directly affects the Thai economy and thereby Thailand's development. The increasing infection rate of HIV and the subsequent mortality rate of Thai's youths will restrict the future labor force, creating an insufficiency of production capacity for Thailand's future. Simultaneously, such infected and/or affected individuals will place a strain on the Thai health care system. Therefore, the PDA and Viravaidya's HIV/AIDS campaign is both an immediate and long-term solution-based movement.

=== Poverty reduction ===
An increasing rate in population growth is directly related to degrees of poverty in developing states. The repercussion of a high population growth rate include affecting education, health care, employment, economic growth, and overall development. Relative to poverty, high growth rates delay economic growth thereby constraining the poor's consumption capacity. A decrease in the growth rate would have both an immediate effect at the micro level and eventually at a macro level for a state's economy. A decreasing population growth rate creates a work force that must provide for fewer dependents at both ends of the age spectrum.

The common slogan for battling population growth rate is, “delay the first, postpone the second and prevent the third.”

The Community-Based Incentive Thailand (CBIT)

== Criticism ==
PDA received some criticism in its early stages, mainly from government institutions. As a non-profit organization, it was considered controversial for PDA to sell condoms instead of distributing them for free. PDA counter-argued that selling condoms was necessary in order for it to sustain itself as an organization and rely less on foreign aid.

== See also ==
- Total fertility rate
- Population control
- Birth control
- Poverty reduction
