= Turk Pipkin =

American actor and author (born 1953)

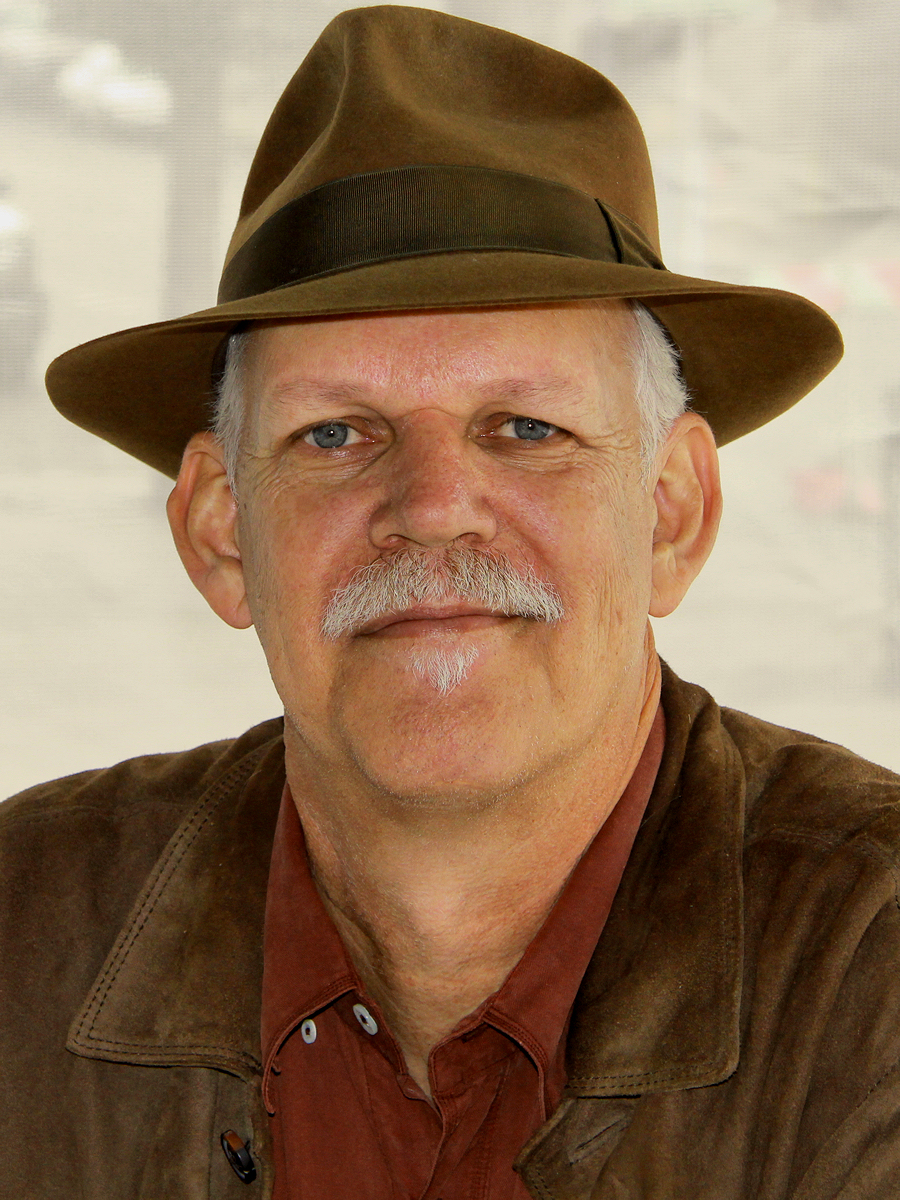
- Pipkin in 2012
- Born: Clyde Turk Pipkin; July 2, 1953 (age 73); Tom Green, Texas, U.S.
- Occupations: Author, Filmmaker, Activist
- Writing career
- Notable works: When Angels Sing, The Old Man and the Tee, Fast Greens
- Website: twitter.com/turkpipkin

Turk Pipkin (born July 2, 1953) is an American author, actor, comedian and director. He is the co-founder of The Nobelity Project, a non-profit organization which seeks to find solutions to global problems, and which advocates for basic rights for children. He was a lifelong friend of Harry Anderson up until Anderson's death in 2018.

== The Nobelity Project ==
In 2006, Pipkin founded the non-profit organization The Nobelity Project with his wife, Christy Pipkin. After interviewing nine Nobel Laureates, he directed Nobelity, a film about global problems such as energy, hunger, land mines, and climate change. He then spent 3 years traveling to 5 continents and 20 countries filming a sequel, One Peace at a Time, which focuses on solutions in the areas of water, nutrition, education, health care, opportunity, environment and peace. In 2011 The Nobelity Project released their third film, entitled Building Hope about construction of Mahiga Hope High School in rural Kenya. The Nobel Laureates he worked with include Desmond Tutu, Wangari Maathai, Ahmed Zewail, Steven Chu , Harold Varmus, Steven Weinberg, Muhammad Yunus, Amartya Sen, Jody Williams, Joseph Rotblat and Richard Smalley.

Pipkin is also the project leader for The Nobelity Project’s work to build Mahiga Hope High School in the Aberdare Mountains of Kenya. Pipkin is a member of the Clinton Global Initiative, and in 2010 received the White Lotus Humanitarian Award from the Government of China at the Macau International Digital Film Festival.

== The Nobelity Project in Kenya ==
=== Mahiga Hope High School ===
In 2009 The Nobelity Project began construction on Mahiga Hope High School in rural Kenya. It is the first high school in the area of Mahiga near Nyeri. Mahiga Hope High School along with its Mahiga Rainwater Court held its grand opening on October 1, 2010.

=== Mahiga Rainwater Court ===
In 2009, The Nobelity Project in partnership with Architecture for Humanity received "The Game Changers Award," an architectural grant from Nike, Inc. to build a multiple purpose game, performance, and rain water collection facility. The facility serves Mahiga Hope High as well as a community center for Mahiga. It also provides the school's source of drinking water. The Mahiga Rainwater Court opened on October 1, 2010.

=== Mahiga Hope Library ===
In 2010, along with the classroom building for Mahiga Hope High, construction began on the Mahiga Hope Library. This library will provide books to the community of Mahiga, donated by individuals as part of the book drive, 1000 Books for Hope. The library will have textbooks and reference books in English and Swahili.

== Work as an author ==
Turk Pipkin has worked as a screen and television writer, as a freelance journalist and contributing editor for numerous national magazines, and has authored nine books of fiction and nonfiction. His most recent book is the New York Times bestseller The Tao of Willie, co-authored with Willie Nelson. His novels include Fast Greens and When Angels Sing, which was adapted as a feature film under the title Angels Sing. He has written for multiple television productions.

Writing credits include:

- When Angels Sing (Algonquin Books) Author. (Released as the movie Angels Sing produced by Fred Miller)
- Fast Greens (Hardback Edition, Dial Press). (In development with Warner Bros/1492 Productions)
- The Old Man and the Tee (St. Martin’s Press) Author
- Born of the River (Softshoe Publishing) Author
- Harry Anderson's Games You Can't Lose (Pocket Books) Co-author
- Barton Springs Eternal, The Soul of a City (Softshoe Publishing) Co-editor
- Be a Clown! (Workman Books)
- Texas Monthly magazine, contributing editor

=== Writing work in television ===
- Night Court (1989) "Attack of the Mac Snacks" (1989) (TV) (co-writer)
- Harry Anderson: The Tricks of His Trade (1996) (TV) (writer)
- Farm Aid: The Tenth Anniversary Concert (1995) (TV) (writer)
- Walt Disney World Christmas Day Parade (2001) (TV) (writer)
- The World's Greatest Magic 5 (1998) (TV) (writer)
- The Glenn Miller Band Reunion (1989) (TV) (writer)
- Going to California (Showtime) (TV) (writer)

== Filmography ==
Turk Pipkin is most known as an actor for his work in the HBO series The Sopranos and The Leftovers and in the feature films The Alamo, Friday Night Lights, Waiting for Guffman and Richard Linklater's A Scanner Darkly.

Year	Movie	Role	Notes
1983	Bill: On His Own	Juggler	TV movie
1985	Harry Anderson's "Hello, Sucker"	Turk Pipkin	HBO Special
1984-1987	Night Court	Vicki Horwits / Man in cafeteria / Juror	3 episodes Uncredited
1991	Hard Promises	Tucker	
1994	Blank Check	Magician	
1996	Waiting For Guffman	Ping Pong Ball Juggler	
2001	The Sopranos	Aaron Arkaway	4 episodes
2004	The Alamo	Issac Millsaps	
2004	Friday Night Lights	Skip Baldwin	
2006	A Scanner Darkly	Creature	
2006	Infamous	Prisoner 2	
2006	Idiocracy	Guy at Costco	
2006	Nobelity		Director
2008	Pineapple	Robert	
2009	One Peace at a Time		Director
2012	Satellite of Love	Lou	
2012	Angels Sing	Uncle Theo	
2014	The Leftovers	Edward/Pillar Man	
2015	Divine Access	Esoteric Fellowship Leader	
