= Water.org =

US-based nonprofit organization

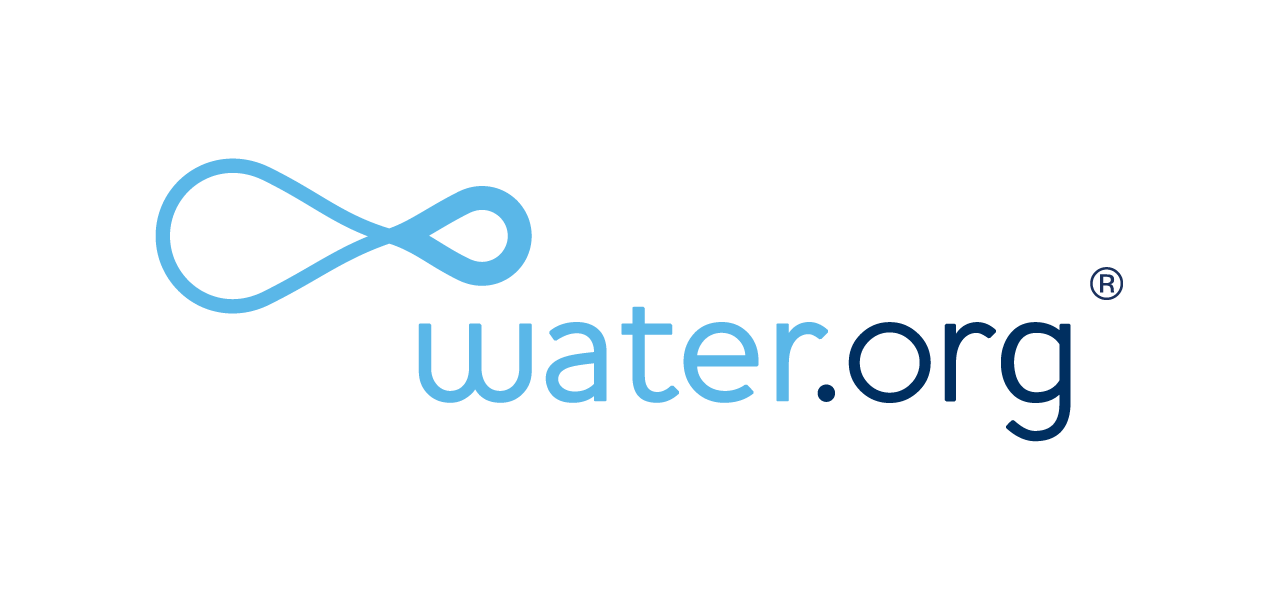
- A video by Water.org
- Formation: 2009 (1990 as WaterPartners)
- Type: Developmental aid organization
- Tax ID no.: 58-2060131
- Executive Director: Gary White
- Key people: Matt Damon (co-founder); Gary White (co-founder)
- Website: water.org

Water.org is an international nonprofit organization founded by Matt Damon and Gary White in 1990. The organization helps people living in poverty get access to safe water and improved sanitation through affordable financing.

Water.org currently works in 13 countries in Africa, Asia and Latin America: Bangladesh, Brazil, Cambodia, India, Indonesia, Kenya, Mexico, Peru, Philippines, South Africa, Tanzania and Uganda.

== Description ==
In 1990, Gary White founded WaterPartners International. White had observed that people were paying high prices for water, whether paying a local water vendor or paying with their time by walking to collect water. He had an idea to loan people the money upfront for them to finance the purchase and installation of a water tap or toilet. In 2008, the first loans for water connections and toilets were distributed in India.

Water.org utilizes microfinancing solutions to help people in need of loans for water and sanitation. Water.org partners with local financial institutions in the countries they work in to add water and sanitation loans to their portfolios.

Many families cannot pay to connect to local water networks. A loan for water allows families to connect to a water supply and even get a faucet inside their home. This saves families money from paying large portions of their income to a water vendor. It also results in women and children having more time to attend work and school that was previously spent walking to collect water.

== Corporate partnerships ==
Water.org has partnered with corporate sponsors to promote awareness and raise funds. In this context, co-founder Matt Damon has been the face of advertising campaigns to promote Water.org in conjunction with products from major sponsors.

In October 2011, Water.org received an $8 million grant from the PepsiCo Foundation to scale up WaterCredit, tying in with the Aquafina and Ethos Water brands of bottled water owned by PepsiCo and Starbucks.

Stella Artois became a Water.org partner in 2015. In January 2018, their new commercial, which premiered during the NFL Super Bowl, encouraged viewers to contribute to the work of Water.org by purchasing a limited-edition Stella Artois "blue chalice", imprinted with an embellished blue version of the brand's logo. Each purchase would help Water.org provide up to five years of clean water for one person in the developing world.

In October 2021, a new partnership was announced with the cryptocurrency trading platform Crypto.com, whereby Water.org was to receive a $1 million donation. The announcement quoted Damon as saying, "Crypto.com gave us this great donation, which is amazing. The money that I make for the commercials to promote them, I give 100% of that to Water.org as well. So, it's millions of dollars coming in to us. The thing that we really are proud of with what we're doing and where it relates to Crypto.com is the self-determination piece, because it's about giving people more power. It's about just creating an environment where people can help themselves."

Janji works with water.org in Haiti.

== Ratings ==
As of December 2020, Charity Navigator gave the organization 4 out of 4 stars, with an overall score of 95.75 out of 100. Water.org has received a 4 out of 4 star rating for 11 years. The organization is recognized as an accredited charity by the Better Business Bureau's Wise Giving Alliance, and has a "Platinum Seal of Transparency" from Guidestar.

== Awards ==
- 2019 Global Global Water Awards: Water Company of the Year
- 2020 CNN Heroes
- International Peace Award – Community of Christ – 2019
- Forbes 400 Lifetime Achievement Award for Social Entrepreneurship – 2017
- World Economic Forum's Global Agenda Council on Water – 2014
- Crystal Award winner from the World Economic Forum – 2014
- Environmental Media Award from The Environmental Media Association – 2013
- Schwab Foundation Social Entrepreneur – 2012
- TIME 100 list of the world's most influential people – 2011
- Skoll Foundation Social Entrepreneur – 2009
- Philanthropy World Hall of Fame – 2008
