= Mechai Viravaidya =

Thai politician and activist (born 1941)

- มีชัย วีระไวทยะ
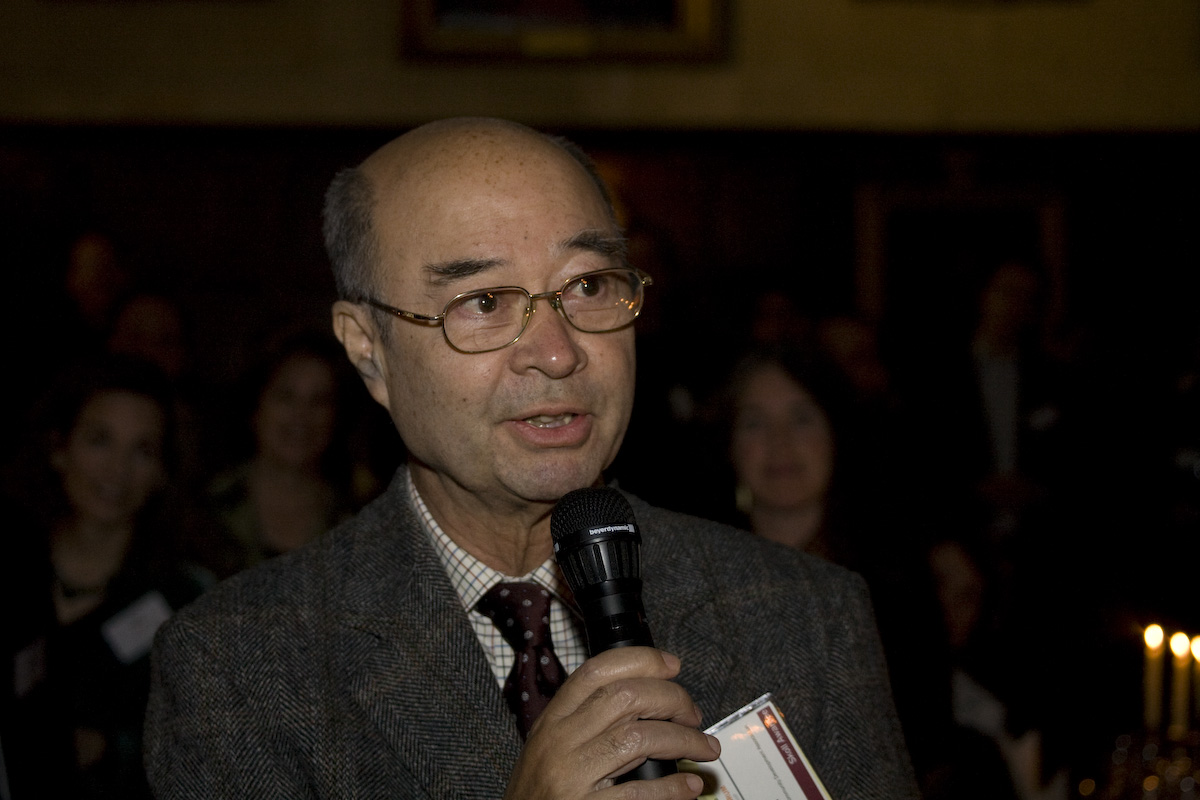
- Mechai in 2008

Personal details
- Born: 17 January 1941 (age 85) Bangkok, Siam
- Spouse: Thanpuying Putrie Viravaidya
- Children: Sujima Saengchaiwuttikun
- Education: International House, Melbourne

Mechai Viravaidya (born 17 January 1941, Thai: มีชัย วีระไวทยะ; RTGS: Michai Wirawaithaya) is a former politician and activist in Thailand known for promoting condoms, family planning, and AIDS awareness. Since the 1970s, Mechai has been affectionately called "Mr. Condom", and condoms are often referred to as "mechais" in Thailand. From the time that he began his work, the average number of children in Thai families has decreased from 7 to 1.5. He has been credited with leading efforts that improved the lives of millions of people.

== Early life ==
Viravaidya was born in Bangkok to a Scottish mother and a Thai father, both of whom were doctors and had met while studying in Edinburgh. He is one of four children. His younger brother, Sunya, is the founder of the Pattaya International Hospital. One of his sisters, Sumalee Viravaidya, was a journalist in the 1970s, writing for the Bangkok Post and The Nation. Viravaidya was educated in Australia at Geelong Grammar School and at Trinity College of the University of Melbourne, where he obtained a Bachelor of Commerce degree. In 1965, he returned to Thailand and in 1966, he started to work in family planning, emphasizing the use of condoms. In 1973, he left the civil service and founded a nonprofit service organization, the Population and Community Development Association (PDA), to continue his efforts to improve the lives of the rural poor. He used such events as condom-blowing contests for schoolchildren, encouraging taxi drivers to hand out condoms to their customers, and founding a restaurant chain called Cabbages and Condoms, where condoms were given to customers with the bill.

Next to the original restaurant, in Bangkok, there is a family planning clinic, one of several places in the Thai capital where poor women can receive pregnancy termination, a practice that is legal in the country per Section 305 of the Thai penal code but often perceived as illegal. The clinic is permitted by the authorities due to the dangers of unsafe abortion caused by economic difficulties.

== Later life ==
Viravaidya served as deputy minister of industry from 1985 to 1986, under prime minister Prem Tinsulanonda. He later served as senator from 1987 until 1991. During this time, AIDS appeared in Thailand, and he increased his efforts to promote sexual-safety awareness.

A military coup in 1991 installed prime minister Anand Panyarachun, who then appointed Viravaidya minister for tourism, information, and AIDS. He was able to start a large, successful AIDS education campaign and served until 1992. At that time, he became the chairman of the Foundation for International Education, a nonprofit organization that serves as the governing body of the NIST International School. Viravaidya continued to serve as chair until stepping down in May 2002.

In 1995, he was appointed an honorary officer of the Order of Australia, for "service to Australian-Thai relations and contributions to the world AIDS debate".

In 2004, Viravaidya again became a senator. In 2006, he won praise from the toilet industry (but criticism from the retail industry) for proposing that retailers be obliged to build a public toilet for every ten square metres of retail space.

As of 2007, Viravaidya continued to oversee rural development and health initiatives as the chairman of PDA, now the largest NGO in Thailand, with 600 employees and 12,000 volunteers. On 29 May 2007, PDA was awarded the Bill & Melinda Gates Foundation's Gates Award in recognition of its pioneering work in family planning and HIV/AIDS prevention. This award came with a grant of $1,000,000.
