= A Glimmer of Hope Foundation =

U.S. nonprofit organization working in Ethiopia

- Motto: "Eliminate poverty, illuminate lives"
- Established: 2000
- Co-Founders: Philip Berber and Donna Berber
- Budget: Revenue: $5,781,367; Expenses: $7,890,787 (FYE December 2016)
- Address: 3600 N. Capital of Texas Hwy. Bldg. B, Suite 330; Austin, Texas 78746
- Location: Austin, Texas
- Website: www.glimmer.org

The A Glimmer of Hope Foundation was founded by Texas-based philanthropists Philip Berber and Donna Berber to reduce extreme poverty in rural Ethiopia. In 2010, Philip and Donna were ranked #7 by Barron's in its list of '25 Best Givers' in the world, and dubbed as "capitalist crusaders", by the New York Times Magazine. From 2001 to 2010, the foundation had funded more than 4,000 projects throughout the country. A Glimmer of Hope also runs a local program within Austin for at-risk youth and senior citizens. Currently, their Board of Directors consist of the two co-founders, Philip and Donna Berber, Ryan Berber, Shane Berber, Santiago Montoya, and Jake Berber.

== Founding ==
A Glimmer of Hope was founded by the Berbers in 2000 using $100 million in proceeds from the sale of online trading company CyBerCorp to Charles Schwab. The foundation uses a business-based model, with the goal of being a self-sustaining charity. The foundation is headquartered in Austin, Texas, and runs a national office in Addis Ababa, Ethiopia.

== Programs ==
Since A Glimmer of Hope was founded in 2000, they have invested $85 million into Ethiopia, completing over 10,000 projects, and impacting 5,000,000 Ethiopian lives. By 2007, A Glimmer of Hope had distributed just over $24 million for the construction of water wells, veterinary clinics, and schools in Ethiopia. Additionally, A Glimmer of Hope allocated $5 million in 2003 for programs in Austin, Texas. One of the foundation's most notable Austin programs is the annual "Camp Glimmer", a seven-week summer program for under-privileged youth. In 2017, Glimmer invested $4.7 million into Ethiopia while working in 49 different villages throughout the year. As a part of this $4.7 million investment, Glimmer had a focus on improving health care, nutrition, and education, as well as stimulating the local economy. These programs are intended to help empower women and young girls through things like providing loans to start businesses, providing pre-natal and post-natal health care, and creating girls clubs.

=== Approach ===
A Glimmer of Hope's approach is to create a network of services that save lives, as well as to take on projects that will help communities across Ethiopia thrive. In order to get to the roots of poverty, Glimmer focuses on four main aspects on improving the lives of those in Ethiopia: water, education, health care, and microfinance. Along with their focus on these four aspects, Glimmer claims that 100% of the donations they receive go directly to the field and to their projects.

=== Methodology ===
According to the Glimmer website, their methodology takes the following approach: "Glimmer invests in village communities for five years, aligns with the government's priorities and engages community members as partners in our work. We focus on four lifesaving services that hold up a community and build resilience." A Glimmer of Hope Foundation has a five step methodology on how they plan and implement their projects. These five steps' main objective is to support sustainability and create the greatest impact. Their five steps include select, plan, implement, power, and evaluate. The main objective of these steps are finding where and how to work, creating unique project plans to meet the needs of each community, implementing the project by hiring local people and engaging the Ethiopian government to help support the project, empowering locals with the tools and resources they need to continue to thrive, and continuing to monitor the projects they've completed.

== Overhead ==
According to the National Council of Nonprofits, "overhead is generally defined as a combination of 'management,' 'general,' and 'fundraising' expenses." In order for a nonprofit organization to do well, it requires some level of overhead to make sure that they're an effective organization. Overhead is calculated by taking the management & general expenses plus fundraising expenses, divided by the total expenses for the fiscal year. According to the Form 990 for A Glimmer of Hope in years 2014 through 2016, they had an overhead of 25.98%, 28.12%, and 28.49%, respectively.

A Glimmer of Hope Overhead Calculations (Expenses in USD)
Year	General and Management Fees	Fundraising Fees	Total Expenses	Overhead Percentage
2014	$2,387,223	$0	$9,187,694	25.98%
2015	$2,139,189	$0	$7,606,735	28.12%
2016	$2,247,930	$0	$7,890,787	28.49%

== Partners ==
A Glimmer of Hope works with a number of partners in providing relief internationally. Among the foundation's supporters are:

- The Clinton Global Initiative
- Irish rocker Bono's ONE Campaign
- The Michael and Susan Dell Foundation
- Charity: Water, with whom A Glimmer of Hope has collaborated on 123 projects in Ethiopia
- Matt Damon's H_{2}O Africa Foundation
- Whole Planet Foundation, a division of Whole Foods Market
- The Austin Tennis Academy
- Water to Thrive
- Netri Foundation
- Dave and Isabel Welland, two of the foundation's most generous supporters
- Tibor P. Nagy, former US ambassador to Ethiopia
