= Living Water International =

Non-profit organization

- Formation: 1990; 36 years ago
- Type: Non-Governmental Organization, Faith-based
- Headquarters: Houston, Texas, United States
- Website: www.water.cc

Living Water International is a faith-based non-profit organization that helps communities in developing countries to create sustainable water, sanitation and hygiene (WASH) programs in response to the global water crisis. It is based in Houston, Texas, United States. It was established in 1990 and currently operates in 17 countries. As of 2024, the organization had completed more than 24,000 water projects which included drilling new water wells, harvesting water, and the rehabilitation of non-working wells. Living Water was a founding member of the Millennium Water Alliance, and is a member of the 58 Alliance, a coalition of Christian organizations united to help eliminate extreme poverty.

In 2006, Living Water became a key partner in the Advent Conspiracy, a movement among Christian churches that calls members to give simpler but more thoughtful gifts that foster relationships, and then use the money they would have spent on expensive gifts to help the needy around the world.

== History ==
In 1990, a group from Houston, Texas traveled to Kenya and saw the need for clean drinking water. They returned to Houston and founded a 501(c)3 non-profit. The organization equipped and trained a team of Kenyan drillers, and Living Water Kenya began operations the next year under the direction of a national board.

One of the organization's co-founders, Harry Westmoreland Jr., worked in the seismic drilling industry. He first saw how important clean water was in 1989 when he visited a missionary who was having difficulty drilling a water well in Peru. In 1989 he invented a portable rig called the LS 100 that could be transported in the back of a pickup truck or in a small boat. The LS 100 can drill 100 feet through soft formations.

== Operations ==
Westmoreland increased the LS 100 rig's drilling capacity in order to sink holes 200 and 300 feet through soft formations. Living Water uses larger traditional rigs to drill through rock formations. The countries Living Water operates in include Guatemala, Honduras, Nicaragua, Peru, Haiti, Dominican Republic, Mexico, Ghana, Burkina Faso, Rwanda, Uganda, Sierra Leone, Liberia, Kenya, Zambia, and Zimbabwe.

Living Water's operations in Kenya have drilled boreholes and rehabilitated water systems. It received funding from the US government's Overseas Private Investment Corporation (OPIC) agency which helped it to acquire extra drilling equipment for its Kenyan operations. OPIC provided Living Water with a $200,000 loan than enabled it to drill approximately 150 wells in Kenya in 2001, and a $500,000 loan in 2006. OPIC gave Living Water a $100,000 loan to in 2002 that was used to drill more than 200 wells in Ghana.

In addition to drilling wells and providing water access, Living Water helps communities adopt hygiene and sanitation practices such as hand-washing and making oral rehydration solution, which help communities utilize water to improve community health.
