= Graveyard (disambiguation) =

A graveyard is a cemetery that is attached to a church.

Graveyard may also refer to:

== Sports ==
- Eugene E. Stone III Stadium (Columbia, South Carolina), home football pitch of the South Carolina Gamecocks
- Olympic Park Stadium (Melbourne) used by the Melbourne Storm rugby league club

== Music ==
- Graveyard (band), a Swedish rock/metal band
  - Graveyard (album), a 2007 album by Graveyard
- The Graveyard (album), a 1996 album by King Diamond
- "Graveyard (song)", a 2019 song by Halsey from the album Manic

== Others ==
- The Graveyard (film), 2006 low-budget horror film
- The Graveyard (video game), a 2008 Belgian videogame
- Graveyard (game), a game most commonly played by children on the playground, or at parties
- Graveyard poets, or Graveyard School, 18th-century English poets
- Graveyard Peak, a mountain in California

== See also ==
- (includes many titles of form "The xxx Graveyard" or "xxx graveyard")
