= Capriccio Espagnol =

1887 orchestral suite by Rimsky-Korsakov

Capriccio espagnol
- Orchestral suite by Nikolai Rimsky-Korsakov
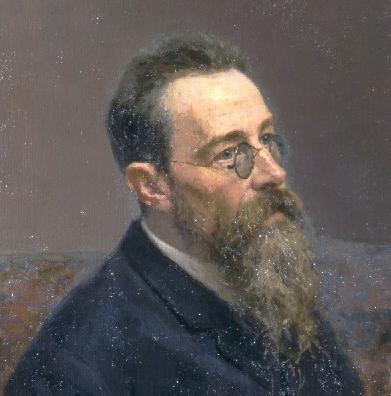
- The composer in 1893, portrayed by Ilya Repin
- Native name: Russian: Каприччио на испанские темы
- Opus: 34
- Composed: 1887
- Movements: five
- Scoring: orchestra

Capriccio espagnol, Op. 34, is the common Western title for a five movement orchestral suite, based on Spanish folk melodies, composed by the Russian composer Nikolai Rimsky-Korsakov in 1887. It received its premiere on 31 October 1887, in St. Petersburg, performed by the Imperial Orchestra conducted by the composer. Rimsky-Korsakov originally intended to write the work for a solo violin with orchestra, but later decided that a purely orchestral work would do better justice to the lively melodies. The Russian title is Каприччио на испанские темы (literally, Capriccio on Spanish Themes).

A complete performance of the Capriccio takes approximately 16 minutes.

== Structure ==
The work is scored for piccolo, 2 flutes, 2 oboes (one doubling on cor anglais), 2 clarinets (in B♭ and A), 2 bassoons, 4 horns (in F), 2 trumpets (in B♭, A), 3 trombones, tuba, percussion (timpani, triangle, side drum, bass drum, cymbals, tambourine, and castanets), harp, and strings.

It has five movements, divided into two parts comprising the first three and the latter two movements respectively.

1. Alborada
2. Variazioni
3. Alborada
4. Scena e canto gitano ("Scene and Gypsy song")
5. Fandango asturiano

The first movement is a festive and exciting dance, typically from traditional Asturian music to celebrate the rising of the sun. It features the clarinet with two solos, and later features a solo violin with a solo similar to the clarinet's.

The second movement begins with a melody in the horn section. Variations of this melody are then repeated by other instruments and sections of the orchestra.

The third movement presents the same Asturian dance as the first movement. The two movements are nearly identical, in fact, except that this movement has a different instrumentation and key.

The fourth movement opens with five cadenzas — first by the horns and trumpets, then solo violin, flute, clarinet, and harp — played over rolls on various percussion instruments. It is then followed by a dance in triple time leading attacca into the final movement.

The fifth and final movement is also an energetic dance from the Asturias region of northern Spain. The piece ends with an even more rousing statement of the Alborada theme.

== Characteristics ==
The piece is often lauded for its orchestration, which features a large percussion section and many special techniques and articulations, such as in the fourth movement when the violinists, violists, and cellists are asked to imitate guitars (the violin and viola parts are marked "quasi guitara"). Despite the critical praise, Rimsky-Korsakov was annoyed that the other aspects of the piece were being ignored. In his autobiography, he wrote:

The opinion formed by both critics and the public, that the Capriccio is a magnificently orchestrated piece — is wrong. The Capriccio is a brilliant composition for the orchestra. The change of timbres, the felicitous choice of melodic designs and figuration patterns, exactly suiting each kind of instrument, brief virtuoso cadenzas for instruments solo, the rhythm of the percussion instruments, etc., constitute here the very essence of the composition and not its garb or orchestration. The Spanish themes, of dance character, furnished me with rich material for putting in use multiform orchestral effects. All in all, the Capriccio is undoubtedly a purely external piece, but vividly brilliant for all that. It was a little less successful in its third section (Alborada, in B-flat major), where the brasses somewhat drown the melodic designs of the woodwinds; but this is very easy to remedy, if the conductor will pay attention to it and moderate the indications of the shades of force in the brass instruments by replacing the fortissimo by a simple forte.

== In popular culture ==
- The work is played during the opening credits and as the Spanish Carnival background music during Josef von Sternberg's film The Devil Is a Woman (1935), credited on screen as 'Music based on Rimsky-Korsakoff's "Spanish Caprice" and Old Spanish Melodies'.
- Excerpts were heard in the fictional 1947 biopic of Rimsky-Korsakov, Song of Scheherazade.
- A recording by the Moscow Radio Symphony in the film Women on the Verge of a Nervous Breakdown (1988).
- The work’s third and fifth movements are featured in the Baby Einstein video Neighborhood Animals.
- A recording by "Philharmonia Slavonica" featured in the film Brokeback Mountain (2005). The "Philharmonia Slavonica" is a pseudonymous group that appears on a number of recordings of the bargain-record producer Alfred Scholz. The performances attributed to them are often by the Austrian Radio (ORF) Orchestra.
- The work's fourth movement is featured prominently in a 1998 television commercial for Pizza Hut, famously starring the former leader of the Soviet Union, Mikhail Gorbachev.
- An orchestra performs the opening of the piece in the series Little Fires Everywhere (2020).

== Ballet Adaptations ==
- Capriccio Espagnol choreographed by Leonid Massine in collaboration with Argentinita with Scenery and Costumes by Mariano Andreu. First performed by the Ballet Russe de Monte-Carlo at the Opéra de Monte-Carlo on May 4, 1939 with Argentinita as the Gypsy Girl, Leonid Massine as a Gypsy Youth, Alexandra Danilova as a Peasant Girl, Michael Paniev as a Peasant Youth and member of the company. This ballet was later produced by Warner Bros. for the film "Spanish Fiesta."
- Capriccio Espagnol choreographed by Roman Mykyta and originally performed by the Ballet Theatre of Maryland in January 2023.

== Notable recordings ==
- London Symphony Orchestra conducted by Ataúlfo Argenta (Decca Records, 1957)
- New York Philharmonic conducted by Leonard Bernstein (Sony Classical, 1959)
- Berlin Philharmonic conducted by Lorin Maazel (Deutsche Grammophon, 1959)
- Czech Philharmonic conducted by Karel Ančerl (Supraphon, 1964)
- Philadelphia Orchestra conducted by Eugene Ormandy (Sony Classical, 1965)
- London Symphony Orchestra conducted by Sir Charles Mackerras (Telarc, 1990)
- Oslo Philharmonic conducted by Vasily Petrenko (LAWO Classics, 2020)
