= Language Nursery =

- Baby Einstein episode
- 2004 DVD cover
- Episode no.: Episode 1
- Directed by: Julie Aigner-Clark
- Narrated by: Julie Clark (English); Freda Guetarni (French; 1997-2000); Valérie Siclay (French; 2000-2004); Gabriele Rewis (German); Lynne Albertson (Hebrew; 1997-1998); Iris Zinger (Hebrew; 1998-2004); Miyuki Tayaka-Paisley (Japanese; 1997-2000); Miho Mettais (Japanese; 2000-2004); Ludmilla Zaitsev (Russian); Erica Silva (Spanish; 1997-2000); María Fernanda Morales (Spanish; 2000-2004)
- Editing by: Ralph Heigl; Bill Clark
- Original release date: January 31, 1997
- Running time: 28 minutes

Episode chronology
← Previous "N/A"	Next → "Baby Mozart"

"Language Nursery: Voices from Many Lands" (originally titled Baby Einstein) is the first video in the direct-to-video edutainment series Baby Einstein. It was released on January 31, 1997.

The video was created by Julie Aigner-Clark, the founder of The Baby Einstein Company, who was unhappy with the media catered toward children at the time and desired to make something for her daughter, Aspen. The video received mostly positive ratings from newspapers and other press reviews and sold over 100 videos within the first week of the video's release in stores.

The video features nursery rhymes, alphabets, and counting sequences in seven different languages: English, French, German, Hebrew, Japanese, Russian, and Spanish, to the visuals of toys by several manufacturers and images, intended to stimulate an infant's brain, along with other natural sounds and music.

== Development and production ==
Clark stated that she desired to create a video board book, with images and toys against black and white backgrounds, as opposed to animation which Clark felt her daughter could not focus on as well. Research she read indicated that infants were able to respond to and produce sounds from all languages at six months, but that the ability was gone by one year as children often only hear one language, and thus the repeated exposure to the sounds benefit the brain's auditory cortex.. She also stated that she had read a Newsweek article discussing the benefits of exposing a child to classical music and the sounds of foreign language. Clark went to a nearby language school and hired mothers to do the readings in their native tongues in a tone in which they might speak to a baby, replacing the original Spanish speaker with a Mexican restaurant worker due to the original voice actress not being conversational enough. The initial video shoot cost Clark and her husband, Bill, $15,000 for the first video shoot ($31,000 in 2026).

== Video guide ==
Baby Einstein: Language Nursery: Voices from Many Lands
Language	Narrator				Voiceover/Music	English Translation	Type	Visual (with manufacturer if toy)		
Language	1997	1998	2000	2004	Voiceover/Music	English Translation	Type	1997	2000	2004
English	Julie Aigner-Clark				Hello!		Greeting	Bear in the Box (Ambi Toys)		
English	—N/a				Baby Einstein Theme	—N/a	Song	Opening Titles		
—N/a								Fish Bowl (zoomed in)		Fish Bowl (zoomed out)
German	Gabriele Rewis				Leise, Peterle, Leise	Quiet, Young Peter, Quiet	Nursery Rhyme	Red, black, and white patterns		
—N/a					Old MacDonald Had a Farm	—N/a	Song	Roly Poly The Friendly Calf (Iwaya)		
Russian	Ludmilla Zaitsev				1-20		Counting Sequence	Rock-A-Stack (Fisher-Price)		Stacking Wooden Rings (Schylling)
—N/a								Sesame Street Express Ride-On Train (TYCO)		Fantasy Train Set (LGB)
Japanese	Miyuki Tayaka-Paisley		Miho Mettais		あいうえお (Aiueo)		Alphabet	Liquid Motion Tumbler (Carlisle)		
English	Julie Aigner-Clark				Jack and Jill		Nursery Rhyme	The Funny Barnyard (Dah-Yang Toy)		
Hebrew	Lynne Albertson	Iris Zinger			נומי נומי (Numi, Numi)	Sleepy, Sleepy	Nursery Rhyme	Flowers		
German	Gabriele Rewis				Backe, backe Kuchen	Bake, bake a cake	Nursery Rhyme	Bright Starts Musical Mobile (Kids II, Inc.)		
Spanish	Erica Silva		María Fernanda Morales		Hola!	Hello!	Greeting	Bear in the Box (Ambi Toys)		
French	Freda Guetarni		Valérie Siclay		1-20		Counting Sequence	Cardboard Bricks (Rolyco)		
Russian	Ludmilla Zaitsev				Wiegenlied, K. 350 (Bernhard Files) (Note: While once attributed to Mozart, as his KV. 350, "Wiegenlied" (Cradle Song), this work is now often credited to Bernhard Flies, an amateur composer who was around 15 years old when the work was composed. Originally written in German, here it is sung in Russian. Originally sung in the key of F major, here, it is transposed to B-flat major.)	—N/a	Lullaby	Spell Candles (LadyRobyn)		UFO Flash Lamp (Distributed by various companies)
Japanese	Miyuki Tayaka-Paisley		Miho Mettais		江戸子守唄 (Edo No Komori Uta)	Edo Lullaby	Lullaby	Dreamland Babies Doll: Harmony (Mattel)		Groovy Girls: Cicely (Manhattan Toy)
Japanese	Miyuki Tayaka-Paisley		Miho Mettais		江戸子守唄 (Edo No Komori Uta)	Edo Lullaby	Lullaby	Girl Doll (Baby Gap)		Tidoo Doll (Corolle)
Japanese	Miyuki Tayaka-Paisley		Miho Mettais		江戸子守唄 (Edo No Komori Uta)	Edo Lullaby	Lullaby	Raggedy Ann (Applause)		
Japanese	Miyuki Tayaka-Paisley		Miho Mettais		江戸子守唄 (Edo No Komori Uta)	Edo Lullaby	Lullaby	Betsy Wetsy (Ideal)		Corolline Doll (Corolle)
—N/a								Sesame Street Express Ride-On Train (TYCO)		Fantasy Train Set (LGB)
Spanish	Erica Silva		María Fernanda Morales		Oye! Mira!	Hey Diddle Diddle	Nursery Rhyme	Wiggly Caterpillar (Blue Box)		
German	Gabriele Rewis				1-20		Counting Sequence	Spiral Lamp (Kenart)		
French	Freda Guetarni		Valérie Siclay		J'avais	I Had	Nursery Rhyme	Baby's Music Box Animal Carousel (Shelcore)		Musical Push n' Go Merry (Tomy)
Hebrew	Lynne Albertson	Iris Zinger			האבי בייבי (Habi, Beybi)	Hush, Baby	Nursery Rhyme	Fun Links (Kids II, Inc.)		
Hebrew	Lynne Albertson	Iris Zinger			שלום (Shalom!)	Hello!	Greeting	Bear in the Box (Ambi Toys)		
Hebrew	Lynne Albertson	Iris Zinger			אלפבת (Aleph-bet)	Alphabet	Alphabet	Foam Learning Blocks (Lee Chyun)		ABC Big Blocks (Schylling)
Spanish	Erica Silva		María Fernanda Morales		Brilla, Brilla, Estrellita!	Twinkle, Twinkle, Little Star	Nursery Rhyme	Red, black, and white patterns		
English	Julie Aigner-Clark				Humpty Dumpty		Nursery Rhyme	Curious Creatures: Busy Starfish (The First Years)		
French	Freda Guetarni		Valérie Siclay		Alphabet			Bright Starts Musical Mobile (Kids II, Inc.)		
—N/a								Wind-Up Musical Lamb (Batnam)		Lily Lamb (Eden)
—N/a								Sesame Street Express Ride-On Train (TYCO)		Fantasy Train Set (LGB)
Russian	Ludmilla Zaitsev				Маленькие гуси (Malen'kiye Gusi)	Little Geese	Nursery Rhyme	The Funny Barnyard (Dah-Yang Toy)		
German	Gabriele Rewis				Kinderpredigt	Children's Sermon	Nursery Rhyme	Seeding Colorful Pinwheel (IKEA)		
English	Julie Aigner-Clark				1-20		Counting Sequence	Wind-Up Musical Teaching Clock (Fisher-Price)		Tick Tock Musical Clock (Tolo Toys)
Japanese	Miyuki Tayaka-Paisley		Miho Mettais		こんにちは (Konnichiwa!)	Hello!	Greeting	Bear in the Box (Ambi Toys)		
French	Freda Guetarni		Valérie Siclay		Little Bo-Peep		Nursery Rhyme	Bright Ball (Playskool)		Pupsqueak Puppy (Learning Curve)
French	Freda Guetarni		Valérie Siclay		Little Bo-Peep		Nursery Rhyme	Jellybeans		
French	Freda Guetarni		Valérie Siclay		Little Bo-Peep		Nursery Rhyme	Curious Creatures: Busy Starfish (The First Years)		
French	Freda Guetarni		Valérie Siclay		Little Bo-Peep		Nursery Rhyme	My First Christmas Bear (Eden)		Sherbert Pig (Eden)
French	Freda Guetarni		Valérie Siclay		Little Bo-Peep		Nursery Rhyme	Leggy Larry the Octopus (Jolly Toys)		Lamaze Octotunes (Learning Curve)
—N/a					Do You Know the Muffin Man?	—N/a	Song	Wooden Xylophone (Plan Toys)		
Spanish	Erica Silva		María Fernanda Morales		Alfabeto	Alphabet	Alphabet	Precision Gyroscope (TEDCO)		
Hebrew	Lynne Albertson	Iris Zinger			1-20		Counting Sequence	Fish Bowl (zoomed out)		
—N/a								Sesame Street Express Ride-On Train (TYCO)		Fantasy Train Set (LGB)
Hebrew	Lynne Albertson	Iris Zinger			שיר משחק (Kulam)	Everyone Clap Hands (Game Song)	Nursery Rhyme	Rock-A-Stack (Fisher-Price)		Stacking Wooden Rings (Schylling)
English	Julie Aigner-Clark				Twinkle, Twinkle, Little Star		Nursery Rhyme	Spell Candles (LadyRobyn)		UFO Flash Lamp (Distributed by various companies)
Japanese	Miyuki Tayaka-Paisley		Miho Mettais		1-20		Counting Sequence	Red, black, and white patterns		
Russian	Ludmilla Zaitsev				Тише Малыш (Tishe Malysh)	Hush, Baby	Nursery Rhyme	Julie Aigner-Clark's hand		
French	Freda Guetarni		Valérie Siclay		Bonjour!	Hello!	Greeting	Bear in the Box (Ambi Toys)		
German	Gabriele Rewis				Alphabet		Alphabet	Rock 'n' Roll Tops: La Bamba (Maui Toys)		Whirlwind Air Powered Gyro-Top (Uncle Milton)
Hebrew	Lynne Albertson	Iris Zinger			לך לישון (Laila Tov, Yedidi)	Good Night, My Friend	Nursery Rhyme	Sleigh Bells (ChimeScapes / JW Stannard)		Wind Chimes
—N/a								Metronome (Wittner) with red sticker		Metronome (Wittner) with yellow sticker
Spanish	Erica Silva		María Fernanda Morales		1-10 (1997–2003)		Counting Sequence	Shake 'n' Shine Rattle (The First Years)		
Spanish	Erica Silva		María Fernanda Morales		1-20 (2004)		Counting Sequence	Shake 'n' Shine Rattle (The First Years)		
English	Julie Aigner-Clark				Little Miss Muffet		Nursery Rhyme	Sesame Street Express Ride-On Train (TYCO)		Fantasy Train Set (LGB)
English	Julie Aigner-Clark				Little Miss Muffet		Nursery Rhyme	Girl Doll (Baby Gap)		Groovy Girls: Cicely (Manhattan Toy)
Japanese	Miyuki Tayaka-Paisley		Miho Mettais		桜 (Sakura)	Cherry Blossoms	Nursery Rhyme	Bell pepper	Banana	
Japanese	Miyuki Tayaka-Paisley		Miho Mettais		桜 (Sakura)	Cherry Blossoms	Nursery Rhyme	Peas		
Japanese	Miyuki Tayaka-Paisley		Miho Mettais		桜 (Sakura)	Cherry Blossoms	Nursery Rhyme	Carrots and celery	Apple	
Russian	Ludmilla Zaitsev				Алфавит (Alfavit)	Alphabet	Alphabet	Cat		
German	Gabriele Rewis				Hallo!	Hello!	Greeting	Red German Hat		Alpine Hat with Quill (Rubie's)
German	Gabriele Rewis				Hallo!	Hello!	Greeting	Mini Plush Duck Rattle (Brio)		Discover & Play Activity Gym Duck (Baby Einstein / Kids II, Inc.)
Japanese	Miyuki Tayaka-Paisley		Miho Mettais		虹 (Niji)	Rainbows	Nursery Rhyme	Floppy Fairy Tales: Hey Diddle Diddle Plush Cow (Eden)		Cow Jumped Over The Moon Plush (Eden)
English	—N/a				Baby Einstein Lullaby	—N/a			End Credits; Aspen Clark playing with My First Playset (Battat)	

== Releases ==
Baby Einstein was released on January 31, 1997, in the baby-centered store The Right Start. The original tape was advertised as offering "visual multilingual experiences that will increase your baby's capacity". In October 1998, Billboard reported that Baby Einstein had sold 40,000 copies since its February 1997 release, primarily through the Right Start catalog and stores associated with Gymboree. Julie Aigner-Clark said she preferred smaller specialty retailers because the $15.95 video was largely "selling itself" without extensive marketing support.

The video went through several re-releases. The first was in 1998, where some transitions were changed as well as the Hebrew narrator, Lynne Albertson, being replaced by Iris Zinger. Another re-release was in 2000, under Family Home Entertainment; aside from being released on both VHS and DVD, German narrator, Gabriele Rewis, re-recorded her dialogue, Japanese narrator Miyuki Tayaka-Paisley was replaced by Miho Mettais, and French narrator Freda Guetrani and Spanish narrator Erica Silva were both redubbed by Voice Productions International, respectively; the images of carrots with parsley and pepper were changed to an apple and banana.

A 2001 re-release by Walt Disney Home Entertainment saw the video retitled "Baby Einstein - Language Nursery", and the 2003 cover saw the video changed from the original starfish logo to a caterpillar. In October 2004, along with the following nine videos created by Clark, were revised by Disney, replacing several toys and changing the credits to credit the toy manufacturers. The video was retitled "Language Nursery - Voices from Many Lands".

== Reception ==
Baby Einstein was recognized by several publications. Reviewers were cautious about its claims about child development. In spring 1997, Parents' Choice gave the video an Approval Award. Other reviewers questioned whether exposure to foreign languages would actually achieve Clark's goal of creating greater brain capacity but still concluded that infants would enjoy the video. Parenting offered an assessment in November 1997 with reviewers stating it was difficult to determine whether the video was successful in building connections in the auditory cortex, however, reported that the infants used as reviewers were "transfixed" by it. The magazine subsequently included Baby Einstein in its Video Magic Award recipients.

Following the video and company's wider attention, critics began examining its infant developmental claims more. An August 1998 article in Thousand Oaks Star expressed skepticism about whether such stimulation could produce intellectual acceleration, with pediatrician Paul Reisser saying that it might instead simply make for an interesting study. Citing developmental research, he emphasized interaction between parents and children and cautioned against trying to place infants into a framework before they were developmentally ready. The following December, The Tennessean framed these developmental benefits as claims made by the video's creators and proponents rather than independently established effects. Pediatricians likewise in April 1999 argued that educational material presented early could be helpful but said the potential of the human brain remained uncertain.
