= Celebrity Home Entertainment =

American home media company (1987-2002)

- Type: Incentive
- Industry: Home video
- Founded: May 1987
- Founder: Noel C. Bloom
- Defunct: 2003
- Headquarters: Canoga Park, California, United States
- Products: Home video releases
- Brands: Just for Kids Home Video
- Total assets: US$6.6million
- Subsidiaries: Celebrity Duplicating Services, Inc.

Celebrity Home Entertainment (also known as simply Celebrity Video), founded by Noel C. Bloom in May 1987, was a home video distributor specializing in mostly obscure material from around the world, as well as B-grade action films and softcore adult fare. They also distributed some material that was popular at the time of its original release, including BraveStarr, Filmation's Ghostbusters, COPS and the 1987 G.I. Joe movie. It was formed after he left International Video Entertainment, which was sold off to Carolco Pictures in 1986. Subsequently, the company was offered the rights to the Video Gems catalog for Chapter 11 bankruptcy proceedings, but the company had withdrawn the offer after a lawsuit.

They were perhaps best known for their Just for Kids Home Video imprint. This imprint offered child-oriented and/or animated material broadcast on television in the United States as well as English-language versions of foreign programming and original acquisitions. Some, though not all, TV series releases were edited into one or two compilation films. Early titles in this imprint were introduced by Bloom's son Noel Bloom Jr., who would remind viewers to adjust the tracking, or tell them how to win a free video.

At launch, two other divisions were established by Celebrity: Feature Creatures, devoted to sci-fi fare, and Let's Party, devoted to "upbeat, one-of-a-kind" titles. At that time, some IVE and Media Home Entertainment employees were said to have "defected" to Celebrity.

Celebrity Home Entertainment filed for bankruptcy protection in 1991, and it closed down completely by 2003. All of their releases are now out of print, while some have been reprinted by other companies.

== Media distributed by Celebrity Home Entertainment ==
=== Just for Kids Home Video ===
Year	Title	Country of origin	Notes
1987	Battle for Moon Station Dallos	Japan	Licensed from Peregrine Film Distribution
1987	Gamera	Japan	Licensed from King Features Entertainment; Also released under Celebrity's Feature Creatures
1987	Gamera vs. Barugon	Japan	Licensed from King Features Entertainment; Also released under Celebrity's Feature Creatures
1987	Gamera vs. Gaos	Japan	Licensed from King Features Entertainment; Also released under Celebrity's Feature Creatures
1987	Gamera vs. Zigra	Japan	Licensed from King Features Entertainment; Also released under Celebrity's Feature Creatures
1987	G.I. Joe: The Movie	United States	
1987	Here We Go	United States	
1987	Here We Go Again!	United States	
1987	Locke the Superpower	Japan	Licensed from Peregrine Film Distribution
1987	Space Firebird	Japan	Licensed from Peregrine Film Distribution
1987–1990; 1992; 1996	Seabert	France	
1987	Space Warriors: Battle for Earth Station S/1	Japan	
1987	Techno Police	Japan	Licensed from Peregrine Film Distribution
1988–1992	The Bluffers	Netherlands	
1988; 1990–1992	BraveStarr	United States	
1988	Defenders of the Vortex	Japan	Licensed from Peregrine Film Distribution
1988	Revenge of the Ninja Warrior	Japan	Licensed from Peregrine Film Distribution
1988	The Elm-Chanted Forest	Croatia	
1988	Gallavants	United States	
1988	Gamera vs. Guiron	Japan	Licensed from King Features Entertainment
1988–1990; 1992	Macron 1	Japan	
1988	Clash of the Bionoids	Japan	Licensed from Peregrine Film Distribution
1988	Oliver Twist	Ireland	Run time: 60 minutes
1988	The Phantom of the Opera	Ireland	Run time: 60 minutes
1989	Ben-Hur	Ireland	Run time: 60 minutes
1989	Clémentine	France	
1989	David and the Magic Pearl	Poland	Licensed from International Film Entertainment
1989	Charles Dickens' Ghost Stories From the Pickwick Papers	Ireland	Run time: 60 minutes
1989	The Heroic Adventures of John the Fearless	Belgium	
1989	The Human Race Club	United States	Based on the series by Joy Berry
1989–1990	Janosch	Germany	Licensed from WDR
1989	A Journey Through Fairyland	Japan	
1989–1990	Lazer Tag Academy	United States	
1989	Les Misérables	Ireland	Run time: 60 minutes
1989	Little Memole	Japan	Released as Wee Wendy
1989–1990; 1992	Ovide and the Gang	Canada	
1989	Quark the Dragon Slayer	Denmark	
1989–1990	Star Street: The Adventures of the Star Kids	Netherlands	
1990	The Adventures of Candy Claus	Australia	Run time: 30 minutes
1990	The Adventures of Lolo the Penguin	Russia	Released as The Adventures of Scamper the Penguin
1990	Arcadia of My Youth	Japan	Released as Vengeance of the Space Pirate
1990	Asterix in Britain	France	Licensed from Gaumont
1990	Asterix Versus Caesar	France	Licensed from Gaumont
1990	Back to the Forest	Japan	
1990	Beverly Hills Teens	United States	Licensed from DIC Enterprises
1990	Bobobobs	Spain/Canada	
1990; 1992	Bumpety Boo	Japan	Licensed from Saban Entertainment
1990	COPS	United States/Canada	Licensed from DIC Enterprises
1990	Foofur	United States	
1990–1992	Filmation's Ghostbusters	United States	
1990	Magical Princess Minky Momo: La Ronde in my Dream	Japan	Released as Gigi and the Fountain of Youth
1990	Katy and the Katerpillar Kids	Mexico	
1990	The Legend of Manxmouse	Japan	
1990	Lollipop Dragon	United States	
1990	Maxie's World	United States	Licensed from DIC Enterprises
1990–1992	Noozles	Japan	Licensed from Saban Entertainment
1990–1991	Rude Dog and the Dweebs	United States	
1990	Samson & Sally	Denmark	Licensed from Nordisk Film
1990	Serendipity the Pink Dragon	Japan	
1990	Sherlock Hound	Japan	
1990	The Story of 15 Boys	Japan	
1990	Stowaways on the Ark	Germany	
1990	The Three Musketeers	Italy/United Kingdom	Licensed from Amazing Movies; Run time: 85 minutes
1990	Tickle Tune Typhoon	United States	Run time: 50 minutes
1990	Wowser	Japan	Licensed from Saban Entertainment
1991–1992	Bozo: The World's Most Famous Clown	United States	
1991	Dreaming of Paradise	Denmark	
1991–1992	Kissyfur	United States	Licensed from NBC
1991–1992	It's Punky Brewster	United States	Licensed from NBC
1991–1992	Ox Tales	Japan	Licensed from Saban Entertainment
1991	Train Mice	Germany	Licensed from WDR; Run time: 40 minutes
1991	The Great Cheese Conspiracy	Czech	Licensed from WDR
1992; 1995	The Adventures of Tom Sawyer	Japan	Released as The All New Adventures of Tom Sawyer and The Adventures of Tom and Huck
1993	The All New Adventures of Pinocchio	Russia	1984 English dub; licensed from Kidpix
1993	The Snow Queen	Russia	1985 English dub; licensed from Kidpix
1993	Swans	Russia	1985 English dub; licensed from Kidpix
1994	Captain of the Forest	Hungary	
1994; 1996	For Better or For Worse	Canada	
1994	The Little Fox	Hungary	
1994	Maria, Mirabela	Romania	Released as The Magical Forest; Run time: 70 minutes
1994	The Secret of the Seal	Japan	
1994	The Tin Soldier	Canada	
1995	The Adventures of Matt the Gooseboy	Hungary	
1995	The Ketchup Vampires	Germany	Compilation movie Run time: 90 minutes
1996	The BFG	United Kingdom	
1996	Favorite Cartoon Classics	United States	
1996; 2000	Happy Ness: Secret of the Loch	United States	
1996; 2000	The Ketchup Vampires II	Germany	Compilation movie narrated
1997; 2001	Gulliver's Travels	United States	
1998	Animaland	United Kingdom	See David Hand
1998; 2000	Jellybean Jungle	United States	Retitled as Jungle Jamboree
1998; 2000	The Toothbrush Family	Australia	
1999	The Poddington Peas	United Kingdom	
1999–2000	Postman Pat	United Kingdom	Licensed from HIT Entertainment
2000	Animal Antics	United Kingdom	
2000	Ketchup: Cats Who Cook	Australia/Japan	

=== Celebrity Video ===
Year	Title	Country of origin	Notes
1987	Hollywood Cop	United States	
1988	Animals of Africa	United States	Licensed from Harmony Gold USA
1988	After Darkness	United States	
1988	Evil Laugh	United States	
1988	Fatal Pulse	United States	
1988	The Inside Man	United States	
1988	Order of the Black Eagle	United States	
1988	Terminal Entry	United States	
1997; 2002	E.Y.E.S. of Mars	Japan	Run time: 80 minutes
1998	Attack of the Super Monsters	Japan	
1998	Collecting Beanies for Fun and Profit	United States	
1998	Pandas: A Giant Stirs	United States	
1998	Return of the Dinosaurs	Japan	

=== Let's Party Home Video ===
Year	Title	Country of origin	Notes
1987	Chippendales: Tall, Dark & Handsome		

=== Celebrity's Feature Creatures ===
Year	Title	Country of origin	Notes
1987	Mighty Jack	Japan	Licensed from King Features Entertainment
1988	Time of the Apes	Japan	Licensed from King Features Entertainment

== Other companies founded by Noel C. Bloom ==
- Artisan Entertainment - Founded in 1981 as Family Home Entertainment; changed its name to International Video Entertainment (IVE), then changed again to LIVE Entertainment Co., and in 1998 to Artisan. Operating as a subsidiary of Lionsgate as of 2003.
- Caballero Home Video
- Monterey Home Video
