= List of Baby Einstein videos =

Baby Einstein (The Baby Einstein Company) is a series of videos designed for infants, founded by Julie Aigner-Clark. After successful sales in the first five years, Clark sold the company to The Walt Disney Company (Disney), also known as Buena Vista in 2001. After eleven years of producing videos, Disney sold the company to Kids II, Inc. in 2013. The franchise has since been rebranded under Kids II, which primarily focuses on toys and other infant products.

== Baby Einstein videos ==
The first 10 videos, released from 1997-2002, were directed by Julie Aigner-Clark. Following the purchase of the company by Disney and when they originally made the videos after those, they were re-released sometime in 2003-2008, with some alterations.

#	Title	Director	Topic	Original release date	Composers	Puppets	Children	Notes
1	Language Nursery	Julie-Aigner-Clark	Exposure to foreign language	March 31, 1997	Bill Weisbach	None	Aspen Clark; Toby Tyler	Released originally under I Think I Can Productions as Baby Einstein
2	Baby Mozart	Julie-Aigner-Clark	Classical music by W.A. Mozart	February 1, 1998 September 9, 2008 (Park Place Productions)	Wolfgang Amadeus Mozart	Bard the Dragon; Papagino Dolphin; Baby Mozart the Koala (2008)	Aspen Clark; Sierra Clark; Chloe Tyler; Toby Tyler	Released originally under I Think I Can Productions; First video to feature Baby Einstein puppets and classical music; When originally released, it featured puppets, but none of them were the host of that video until the 2008 reissue, with Baby Mozart the Koala as the host.; Last video to have a video tutorial of its own until 2000
3	Baby Bach	Julie-Aigner-Clark	Classical music by J.S. Bach	December 6, 1998	Johann Sebastian Bach	None	Aspen Clark; Sierra Clark	Released originally under Aigner-Clark Productions; Second and last video to not feature Baby Einstein puppets, as well as the third and last one where it doesn't feature a puppet host
4	Baby Shakespeare	Julie-Aigner-Clark	13 Words through poetry by William Shakespeare and other poets	November 23, 1999	Ludwig van Beethoven	Bard the Dragon; Sunny Bunny; Boss the Bluebird; Cud the Cow; Stripes the Tiger; Quackamus the Duck; Jane the Monkey; Tooter the Cow	Aspen Clark; Sierra Clark; Dakota Gonzalez; Dylan Gonzalez; Gaby Margas; Madeline Pluto	First educational video; First video to feature Baby Einstein puppets with a puppet host.; First video released under The Baby Einstein Company and the last video distributed by it as an independent company
5	Baby Van Gogh	Julie-Aigner-Clark	6 Colors through paintings by Vincent van Gogh	August 15, 2000	Erik Satie; Georges Bizet; Gioacchino Rossini; Modest Mussorgsky; Johann Strauss, Jr.; Maurice Ravel; Jacques Offenbach; Johannes Brahms; Pyotr Ilyich Tchaikovsky	Vincent van Goat; Quackamus the Duck; Bonkers the Turtle; Bach the Bunny; Benny the Butterfly; Vivian van Goat; Morris Moose; Misty Mouse; Max Sheep	Brad Boller; Brandon Calbart; Aspen Clark; Sierra Clark; Macrae Long; Maddison Long; Gabriel Mazon; Mia Mettais; Madeline Pluto	First video with multiple composers', First video released outside of The Baby Einstein Company and the first released by Family Home Entertainment through Artisan Entertainment; First video to include the 2000-2002 Video Tutorial and the Baby Einstein Caterpillar logo
6	Baby Santa's Music Box	Julie-Aigner-Clark	Winter Holidays; Christmas music	November 1, 2000	Wolfgang Amadeus Mozart; Pyotr Ilyich Tchaikovsky; George Frideric Handel	Rudy the Reindeer; Morris Moose; Padding Penguin; Bard the Dragon; Walrus; Misty Mouse; Polar Bear; Cud the Cow	Aspen Clark; Sierra Clark; Megan de Guzman; Elijah Ellis; Shelby Gary; Macrae Long; Maddison Long; Gaby Margas; John Margas; Sarika Mehta; Kyle Mock; Jaelyn Montgomery; William Stafford	The brown and white reindeer's noses, initially red, are changed to black in 2004 versions
7	Neighborhood Animals	Julie-Aigner-Clark	12 Animals in my Neighborhood	May 15, 2001	Nikolay Rimsky-Korsakov; Ferde Grofé; Ludwig van Beethoven; Domenico Scarlatti; Antonio Vivaldi; Johann Pachelbel	Flip the Frog; Quackamus Duck; Squirt the Pig; Sudsy the Dog; Misty Mouse; Violet Mouse; Neighton the Horse; Cud the Cow	Akiala Nanyamka; Elizabeth; Hannah; Mia Mettais; Sierra Clark; Tyler Chat	Originally released as "Baby Dolittle: Neighborhood Animals"
8	World Animals	Julie-Aigner-Clark	9 Animals in my World	July 24, 2001	Ludwig van Beethoven; Bedřich Smetana; Edvard Grieg; Jack Moss (Deep Blue Sea); Felix Mendelssohn; Antonín Dvořák	Roary the Lion; Soapy the Yellow Bear; Georgia the Giraffe; Jane the Monkey; Murray the Monkey; Wanda the Fish; Kenny the Fox	Akiala Nanyamka; Hunter Clark; Jake Cook	Originally released as "Baby Dolittle: World Animals", Last video released by Family Home Entertainment through Artisan Entertainment
9	Baby Newton	Julie-Aigner-Clark	5 Shapes	March 12, 2002	Antonio Vivaldi; Jack Moss (I Know My Shapes; 2002 - 2004); Callie Moore (I Know My Shapes; 2004)	Issac the Lion; Pavlov the Dog; Quacker the Duck; Neighton the Horse; MacDonald the Cow	None	First video released under Walt Disney Home Entertainment; Only video to utilize computer-animation; Last video to use the original cover format which was used since Language Nursery; Last video to feature the 2000-2002 Video Tutorial
10	Baby Beethoven	Julie-Aigner-Clark	Classical music by Beethoven	October 22, 2002 September 9, 2008 (Park Place Productions)	Ludwig van Beethoven	Beethoven the Giraffe; Pavlov the Dog; Quacker the Duck; MacDonald the Cow; Issac the Lion; Neighton the Horse	Ashano Dewberry; Emily; Etana; Isabella; Rose; Sean Mettais; Selah; Sierra Clark; Zarainy Dewberry	Last video directed by Julie Aigner-Clark until the Discovery Kits in 2010; First video to use the current, more structured-style cover format and to include the About Baby Einstein Tutorial, which were updated by Disney
11	Baby Neptune	Jim Janicek; Len Marino	Water & Ocean	March 18, 2003	Ludwig van Beethoven; George Frideric Handel; Georg Philipp Telemann; Johann Strauss, Jr.	Neptune the Sea Turtle; Duck; Opus the Octopus	Alyson; Chloe; Hannah Nicholls; J.P.; Liam; Madeline B.; Madeline K.; Micala; Natalie; Olivia; Patrick; Samuel; Tripp	First video originally made by Disney; First video directed by Jim Janicek and Len Marino, and the first not to be directed by Julie Aigner-Clark
12	Baby Galileo	Park Place Productions	The sky and Outer space	August 5, 2003	Franz Schubert; Wolfgang Amadeus Mozart; Ludwig van Beethoven; Claude Debussy; Pyotr Ilyich Tchaikovsky; Johann Strauss, Jr.; Frédéric Chopin	Baby Galileo the Kangaroo; Baby Galileo's Mom; Baby MacDonald the Cow; Misty Mouse; Baby Beethoven the Giraffe; Neighton the Horse (Bonus); Flip the Frog (Bonus)	Aasha; Andrew; Anya; Arbor Murphy; Ben; Christian; Dominic; Emilie; Isabella; Jack; Jayden; Jessica; Jordan; Katie; Shane	First video by Park Place Productions
13	Numbers Nursery	Jim Janicek; Len Marino	Numbers	November 25, 2003	Joseph Haydn; Franz Schubert; Amilcare Ponchielli; Frédéric Chopin; Johann Strauss, Jr.; Johann Strauss, Sr.	Tiger; Neighton the Horse; Ladybug; Baby MacDonald the Cow; Duck; Pavlov the Dog; Baby Beethoven the Giraffe; Squirt the Pig	Alexis; Desja; Essence; Johnathan; Katie; Liam; Sarika; Sophia; Maria Celeste (Bonus); Sienna (Bonus)	First video not named after a historical figure and the first video to have been initially released without the word "Baby" in the title
14	Baby MacDonald	Jim Janicek; Len Marino	The farm	March 16, 2004	Franz Schubert; Robert Schumann; Johann Strauss, Jr.; Pyotr Ilyich Tchaikovsky; Felix Mendelssohn	Rooster; Neighton the Horse; Baby MacDonald the Cow; Misty Mouse; Baby Lamb; Squirt the Pig; Baby Chicks (2009); Theo van Goat; Worm (2009; Bonus)	Aidan; Antoinette; Ariana; Hannah; Juila; Liam; Madison; Mason; Michael; Olivia; Zaemire	Named after Old MacDonald from the song of the same name
15	Baby da Vinci	Park Place Productions	Parts of the body displayed through art by Leonardo da Vinci and other artists	August 10, 2004	Arachangelo Corelli; Gaspar Sanz; Thomas Morley; Antonio Vivaldi; Johann Sebastian Bach; George Frideric Handel	Baby da Vinci the Monkey; Mimi the Monkey; Owl; Baby Bach the Bunny; Hugo Hippo; Baby Noah the Elephant; Baby Vivaldi the Mallard (as a toy)	Alexis; Bailey; Brandon; Camila; Gavin; Gillian; Isabella; Isabel; Lauren; Marcos; Marcus; Mariah; Noah; Sky	
16	Baby Noah	Jim Janicek; Len Marino	Wild Animals; Bible story of Noah's Ark	October 26, 2004	Wolfgang Amadeus Mozart; Bedřich Smetana; Ludwig van Beethoven; Georges Bizet; Johann Strauss Jr.; Felix Mendelssohn	Baby Noah the Elephant; Flamingo; Papagino Dolphin; Baby Mozart the Koala; Penguin; Hugo Hippo; Patch the Panda; Tiger (2009); Baby Galileo the Kangaroo; Polar Bear; Issac the Lion; Pavlov the Dog (Bonus, 2004)	Bria; Chloe; Donavan; Georgia; Isabella; Julia; Megan; Samuel; Sophia	The original 2004 versions include an early trailer for Little Einsteins, with footage from an unaired pilot of the series
17	Baby Monet	Jim Janicek; Len Marino	4 Seasons displayed through paintings by Claude Monet	March 8, 2005	Antonio Vivaldi	Baby Monet the Purple Zebra; Zen the Zebra; Season Zebras; Baby Vivaldi the Mallard	Chloe; Daniel; Devin; Hopie; Neveah; Savanah; Shouta; Tony	First video to include the finalized Little Einsteins trailer
18	Baby Wordsworth	Park Place Productions	House items and their sign language	July 19, 2005	Edvard Grieg; Georges Bizet; Carl Philipp Emanuel Bach; Scott Joplin; Claude Debussy; Franz Schubert	Eliot the Cat; Baby Wordsworth the Parrot; Misty Mouse; Violet Mouse; Pavlov the Dog; Bluebird (2009)	Alexandria Suarez; Alison; Ben; Brook; Caidden; Eric; Ian; Kaili; Keanu; Raymond; Trinity; Whitney	Featuring deaf actress Marlee Matlin;
19	On the Go	Jim Janicek; Len Marino	Vehicles	October 25, 2005	Ludwig van Beethoven; Joseph Haydn; Wolfgang Amadeus Mozart; Johann Strauss, Jr.; Gioacchino Rossini; Bedřich Smetana	Neighton the Horse; Raccoon; Hugo Hippo; Baby Hippo; Stella the Cat; Baby Noah the Elephant; Baby Wordsworth the Parrot; Flamingo; Penguin; Pavlov the Dog; Squirt the Pig; Baby Lamb; Opus the Octopus	Alexandra; Caroline; Chloe Davison; Colton; Eleanor; Jace; Martine; Mia; Miu; Olivia; Patrick; Quinn	Last video released on VHS format
20	Meet the Orchestra	Jim Janicek; Len Marino	Band Instruments in the Orchestra	March 7, 2006	Ludwig van Beethoven; Johann Strauss, Jr.; Scott Joplin; Joseph Haydn; Wolfgang Amadeus Mozart	Hugo Hippo; Baby MacDonald the Cow; Baby Santa the Reindeer; Penguin; Neighton the Horse; Violet Mouse; Sunny Bunny; Polar Bear; Walrus; Murray the Monkey; Mimi the Monkey; Baby Bach the Bunny; Baby Mozart the Koala; Baby Vivaldi the Mallard; Duck; Baby Beethoven the Giraffe	Ava; Cameron; Chloe; Colton; Donovan; Ella; Gen; Hannah; Jaden; Jason; Kainoa; Kane; Katherine; Lars; Mari; Maurizio; Michael; Nasharra; Nicolas; Owen; Ryan; Samantha M.; Samantha P.; Sasheea; Sean; Sienna; Thomas Sharkey; Winston	First video released solely as a DVD exclusive
21	Baby's Favorite Places	Park Place Productions	Places around a City Town and their sign language	July 25, 2006	Wolfgang Amadeus Mozart; Scott Joplin	Pavlov the Dog; Stella the Cat; Squirrel; Raccoon; Bluebird	Brittany; Cameron; Catherine; Hannah; Jacob; Jessica; Justin; Kennedy; Lily; Matthew; Rebecca; Ryan; Samantha; Tatyana; Trevor	Featuring deaf actress Marlee Matlin;
22	Baby's First Moves	Jim Janicek; Len Marino	Movement Milestones	October 24, 2006	Johann Sebastian Bach; Antonio Vivaldi; Wolfgang Amadeus Mozart; Ludwig van Beethoven; Albert Lortzing	Opus the Octopus; Baby Noah the Elephant; Baby Galileo the Kangaroo; Hugo Hippo; Baby da Vinci the Monkey (2009); Mimi the Monkey; Murray the Monkey; Baby Beethoven the Giraffe; Pavlov the Dog; Penguin; Baby Bach the Bunny (Bonus); Bluebird (Bonus)	Abigail; Alaysia; Alek; Alexis; Aliya; Amaya; Asher; Ashley; Ashlyn; Brady; Brogan; Brooke; Cameron; Caris; Chancellor; Connor; Easton; Ella N.; Ella T.; Gabriella; Isabel; Isabella; Isaiah; Jack; Jagger; Jayden; Jeremiah; Jessie; Johnavon; Katie; Kelsey; Kyle; Louie; Lucas; Luciano; Maliek; Mariah; Mariella; Matthew Hunter; Maya; Mia H.; Mia L.; Nathan; Nina; Quincy; Rachel; Reagan; Reece; Robbie; Ryan C.; Ryan F.; Siena; Sydney; Tanner; Teagan; Ty; Tyler B.; Tyler S.; William; Zoe	
23	My First Signs	Park Place Productions	First Sign Language	March 13, 2007	Franz Joseph Haydn; Franz Schubert; Ludwig van Beethoven; George Frideric Handel; Johannes Brahms; Robert Schumann	Otter; Squirt the Pig; Baby Otter; Mommy Otter; Duck; Mommy Duck; Pavlov the Dog (Bonus); Daddy Otter (Bonus)	Addison; Alana; Ashanti; Ashley; Ben; Calvin; Camilla; Colin; Corrine; Daniela; Danik; Drew; Enos; Keanu; Kiya; Melika; Noah; Olivia; Rhiannon; Riley; Zahara	Featuring deaf actress Marlee Matlin;
24	Discovering Shapes	Park Place Productions	Shapes	July 24, 2007	Franz Schubert; Wolfgang Amadeus Mozart; Joseph Haydn; Johann Strauss, Jr.; Bedřich Smetana	Randy the Rhino; Raccoon; Flamingo; Squirrel; Bluebird; Hugo Hippo; Baby Beethoven the Giraffe; Baby Wordsworth the Parrot; Owl	Ai; Alex; Casey; Grace F.; Grace H.; Jackson; Jax; Madeline; Matt; Peightyn; Rhys; Sadhana; Sean; Stella; Tico; Tyrone	Last video directed by Park Place Productions
25	Lullaby Time	Jim Janicek; Len Marino	Calming Music and bedtime	October 30, 2007	Johann Sebastian Bach; Johannes Brahms; Wolfgang Amadeus Mozart; Charles Gounod	Baby Lamb; Baby Baaach the Lamb; Baby Lamb's Mom	Courtney; Gianna; Hailey; Hannah; Isramail; Kenneth; Lauren; Megan; Mican; Nassali; Regan; Ryan; Vincente; Wyatt	
26	Baby's First Sounds	Jim Janicek; Len Marino	Exposure to foreign languages and words	March 11, 2008	Wolfgang Amadeus Mozart; Franz Schubert	Bee; Baby Lamb; Baby Baaach the Lamb; Bluebird; Roxy the Cardinal; Hugo Hippo; Baby Mozart the Koala; Baby MacDonald the Cow; Neighton the Horse; Baby da Vinci the Monkey; Mimi the Monkey; Squirrel; Owl (Bonus); Baby Beethoven the Giraffe (Bonus); Bard the Dragon (Bonus, as a snake); Stella the Cat (Bonus); Duck (Bonus)	All footage of children from this video was reused from older videos.: Alese; Alexis; Aria; Avery; Bailey; Brandon Z.; Charles; Chase; Essence; Gavin; Isabella P.; Isabel R.; Jimmy; Katie; Liam; Marco; Maria; Megan; Micha; Michael; Nina; Noah; Patrick W.; Ryan; Sam; Sky; Sophia; Vincent; Ziya; Caris (Bonus); Georgia (Bonus); Isaiah (Bonus); Lauren (Bonus); Logan (Bonus); Reagan (Bonus); Danika (Bonus); Brad Boller (Bonus); Gabriel Mazon (Bonus); Patrick G. (Bonus); Patrick J. (Bonus); Samuel (Bonus)	Has the same topic to Language Nursery, but includes Baby Einstein puppets and one as the host; Last video directed by Jim Janicek and Len Marino
27	World Music	Rick Pendleton; Greg Peterson	Cultural music and traditional instruments around the globe	March 31, 2009	Various/Traditional	Jane the Monkey; Pavlov the Dog; Roary the Lion; Tiger; Penguin; Parrot; Baby Galileo the Kangaroo; Bard the Dragon	Andy; Anthony; Felicia; Jake; Larry; Maxi; Megan; Thevi	Only videos directed by Rick Pendleton and Greg Peterson
28	World Animal Adventure	Rick Pendleton; Greg Peterson	Animals from the seven continents	September 29, 2009	Various/Traditional	Jane the Monkey; Mimi the Monkey; Zen the Zebra; Baby Zebra; Parrot (Grow with Me); Tadpole; Flip the Frog; Patch the Panda; Baby Panda; Seal; Baby Seal; Baabra the Lamb; Lamb; Neighton the Horse; Baby Horse; Baby Mozart the Koala; Baby Koala	Chloe; Ellie; Garrett; Jordan; Jordyn; Katelyn; Matthew; Nicholas; Sadie; Sammy	Only videos directed by Rick Pendleton and Greg Peterson

== Discovery Kit Videos ==
In 2010, a series of Baby Einstein box sets called Discovery Kits were made with Julie Aigner-Clark as the director. Later in 2012, they were released as original videos. The nine Discovery Kits came with a DVD, CD with selections of music heard in the video, and a book and discovery cards for small children.

# of Discovery Kit Series	Title	Topic	Original release date	Composers	Puppets	Children	Notes
1	Baby Mozart	Classical music by W.A. Mozart	November 24, 2010	Wolfgang Amadeus Mozart	Bard the Dragon; Papagino Dolphin	Aspen Clark (video credits); Sierra Clark	Updated version of Baby Mozart
2	Baby Beethoven	Classical music by Beethoven	November 24, 2010	Ludwig van Beethoven	Baby Beethoven the Giraffe; Pavlov the Dog; Duck; Baby MacDonald the Cow; Issac the Lion; Neighton the Horse	Ashano; Emily; Etana; Isabella; Rose; Sean; Selah; Sierra Clark; Zarainy	Updated version of Baby Beethoven
3	Animals Around Me	Animals in the Neighborhood	November 24, 2010	Nikolai Rimsky-Korsakov; Amilcare Ponchielli; Ludwig van Beethoven; Domenico Scarlatti; Johann Pachelbel	Pavlov the Dog; Stella the Cat; Misty Mouse; Violet Mouse; Flip the Frog; Duck; Baby MacDonald the Cow; Neighton the Horse; Squirt the Pig; Rooster	Akiala Nanyamka; Mia Mettais; Sierra Clark	Based on Neighborhood Animals and Baby MacDonald
4	Wild Animal Safari	Wild Animals	November 24, 2010	Bedřich Smetana; Ludwig van Beethoven; Amilcare Ponchielli; Johann Strauss, Jr.; Antonio Vivaldi; Gioachino Rossini; Felix Mendelssohn; Antonín Dvořák; Edvard Grieg	Jane the Monkey; Roary the Lion; Baby Noah the Elephant; Baby Wordsworth the Parrot; Fox; Baby Mozart the Yellow Bear; Baby Beethoven the Giraffe; Murray the Monkey	Akiala Nanyamka; Hunter; Jake	Based on World Animals and Baby Noah
5	World of Words	12 words through poetry by William Shakespeare and other poets	November 24, 2010	Ludwig van Beethoven	Bard the Dragon; Sunny Bunny; Bluebird; Baby MacDonald the Cow; Tiger; Duck; Jane the Monkey; Tooter the Cow	Aspen Clark; Sierra Clark; Dakota Gonzalez (Credited as Dakota Snider); Dylan Gonzalez (Credited as Dylan Snider); Gabrielle Margas; Madeline Pluto	Previously released as Baby Shakespeare
6	World of Colors	Six basic colors through paintings by Vincent van Gogh	November 24, 2010	Erik Satie; Georges Bizet; Gioachino Rossini; Modest Mussorgsky; Johann Strauss, Jr.; Maurice Ravel; Jacques Offenbach; Johannes Brahms; Pyotr Ilyich Tchaikovsky	Vincent van Goat; Duck; Bonkers the Turtle; Baby Bach the Bunny; Vivian van Goat; Morris Moose; Misty Mouse; Max Lamb	Brad Boller; Brandon Calbart; Aspen Clark; Sierra Clark; Macrae Long; Maddison Long; Gabriel Mazon; Mia Mettais; Madeline Pluto	Previously released as Baby Van Gogh
7	Baby Lullaby	Calming music and images	February 22, 2011	Johann Sebastian Bach; Ludwig van Beethoven; Johannes Brahms; Claude Debussy; Charles Gounod; Wolfgang Amadeus Mozart	Baby Baaach the Lamb	Sierra Clark	Based on Baby Bach and Lullaby Time
8	Neptune's Oceans	Animals in the ocean	February 22, 2011	George Frideric Handel; Georg Phillip Telemann; Frédéric Chopin; Jack Moss (Deep Blue Sea); Bedřich Smetana; Georges Bizet; Claude Debussy; Johann Strauss, Jr.	Neptune the Sea Turtle; Papagino Dolphin	None	Based on World Animals and Baby Neptune
9	World of Rhythm	Rhythm instruments	February 22, 2011	Joseph Haydn; Wolfgang Amadeus Mozart; Johann Strauss, Jr.; Léo Delibes; Franz Schubert; Scott Joplin; Frédéric Chopin; Bedřich Smetana; Johann Strauss, Sr.; Pyotr Ilyich Tchaikovsky	Coco the Cockatoo; Pillie the Woodpecker; Flamingo; Parrot; Baby Wordsworth the Parrot; Bard the Dragon; Duck	Angelique; Anna; Annabel; Brandon; Briaja; Carly; Chiara; Cole; Gavin; Gianna; Isabelle; Jack; Jaiden; Jayden; Kelia; Kiryana; Kylie; Nikki; Phenix; Rachel; Riley; Ryder; Sarah; Sophia; Storm; Thomas; Tino	
