= Peace (Graveyard album) =

Studio album by Graveyard
- Released: 25 May 2018
- Genre: Hard rock, neo-psychedelia, psychedelic rock, blues rock
- Length: 42:20
- Label: Nuclear Blast
- Producer: Chips Kiesbye

Graveyard chronology
Innocence & Decadence (2015)	Peace (2018)	6 (2023)

Singles from Peace
- 1. "Please Don't" Released: 5 April 2018; 2. "The Fox" Released: 11 May 2018

Peace is the fifth studio album by Swedish hard rock band Graveyard. The album was released on 25 May 2018. The band initially announced they were recording a new studio album on their Facebook page on 18 December 2017, and on 22 March 2018, the band announced the first trailer of the album, that featured the album's name, release date, and album cover, featuring a fountain in a field with trees.

It is the band's first studio album since their reunion in 2017 after breaking up in September 2016, it's also their first studio album featuring the new drummer, Oskar Bergenheinm, that entered the band after Axel Sjöberg's departure.

== Release ==
On 5 April 2018, The First single from the album, "Please Don't", was released, and on 11 May of the same year, the second single "The Fox" was released.

== Critical reception ==
Professional ratings
Review scores
Source	Rating
Brave Words & Bloody Knuckles	8/10
Distorted Sound	8/10
Ghost Cult	8/10
Glide	10/10
Metal Hammer	4/5 stars
The Metal Observer	7.5/10

The sound of the album is notably heavier than in all the previous albums, featuring more distorted guitars and louder vocals. The album had a great reception in Europe, and became the band's first studio album since 2011's Hisingen Blues to reach No. 1 in the Swedish album charts.

Jamie Cansdale of The Metal Observer said that "in essence, Peace will appeal to brethren of the old ways and long-time fans alike, for its music pumps with the lifeblood which makes rock ‘n’ roll as relevant and glorious as it is today". Dan Swinhoe of Ghost Cult said in his closing comments that "it's fair to say Peace is imperfect but still has more than enough quality moments to be incredibly enjoyable".

According to Matt Brown of Distorted Sound, "Peace moves from strength to strength and despite maybe not being seen as their freshest, most innovative album, it's guaranteed not to disappoint listeners".

== Track listing ==
Peace
No.	Title	Length
1.	"It Ain't Over Yet"	3:39
2.	"Cold Love"	4:53
3.	"See the Day"	3:09
4.	"Please Don't"	4:13
5.	"The Fox"	2:38
6.	"Walk On"	5:22
7.	"Del Manic"	4:26
8.	"Bird of Paradise"	3:43
9.	"A Sign of Peace"	3:41
10.	"Low (I Wouldn't Mind)"	6:36
Total length:		42:20

== Personnel ==
=== Graveyard ===
- Joakim Nilsson - vocals, guitar
- Truls Mörck - bass, vocals track 3 and 8
- Oskar Bergenheim - drums
- Jonatan Ramm - guitar

=== Additional personnel ===
- Chips Kiesbye - producer
- Stefan Boman - engineer

== Charts ==
Chart (2018)	Peak position
Austrian Albums (Ö3 Austria)	33
Finnish Albums (Suomen virallinen lista)	35
German Albums (Offizielle Top 100)	15
Swedish Albums (Sverigetopplistan)	1
Swiss Albums (Schweizer Hitparade)	45
