= Bloody Murder 2: Closing Camp =

- Film poster
- Directed by: Rob Spera
- Written by: John R. Stevenson
- Produced by: Marc Bienstock
- Starring: Katy Woodruff; Kelly Gunning; Amanda Magarian
- Cinematography: Kazuo Minami; David Trulli
- Edited by: Stephen Eckelberry
- Music by: Steven M. Stern
- Production company: MRG Entertainment
- Distributed by: Mainline Releasing; Artisan Entertainment
- Release date: February 18, 2003 (United States)
- Running time: 92 minutes
- Country: United States
- Language: English

Bloody Murder 2: Closing Camp (also known as Halloween Camp in the United Kingdom) is a 2003 American slasher film directed by Rob Spera, and written by John R. Stevenson. A sequel to the 2000 film Bloody Murder, it was released direct-to-video, and stars Katy Woodruff, Kelly Gunning, and Amanda Magarian. The film follows a group of camp counselors who are terrorized by a masked murderer while working at Camp Placid Pines, a summer camp that is said to haunted by a murderous bogeyman-like figure named Trevor Moorehouse.

== Plot ==
Tracy is a camp counselor working to close down Camp Placid Pines for the winter. Also, there are counselors Sofie, Mike, Angela, Elvis, Ryan, James, and boss Rick. At night, the counselors are having a bonfire when Angela suggests a game of Bloody Murder. Upset, Tracy leaves with Mike, while Sofie reveals Tracy's brother, Jason, disappeared at the camp years previously, believed to be dead at the hands of the local myth Trevor Moorehouse. While taking Tracy back to her cabin, Mike upsets her, so he returns to the bonfire as the others are telling the story of Trevor Moorehouse. The latter supposedly got in an accident at the camp years ago and was put in a mental hospital. Continuing the game, James gets chosen to be it. He is blindfolded as the others run through the forest to hide. Soon after, Mike and Ryan dress up as Trevor Moorehouse and scare James, causing a fight to break out. Everyone returns to their cabins apart from James, who remains at the fire. Someone dressed as Trevor Moorehouse confronts James, chopping his legs off with a machete before crushing his head with a rock.

The next morning, Tracy and Mike make up before the counselors meet in the mess hall for breakfast with an angry Rick, who tells the group that James left a note saying he left the camp. Camp cook Juanita becomes scared, thinking Trevor Moorehouse murdered James and decides to leave later that day. As the counselors set about their tasks, Sofie and Elvis contemplate the existence of Trevor Moorehouse while Angela and Ryan take a shower together. Ryan gets a message from Rick on his pager that he wants to see him, so he leaves only to find a grave dug in the forest. Ryan is soon shot with an arrow before the killer buries him.

Meanwhile, Tracy spots the killer lurking through the forest and warns Mike, Sofie, and Elvis. They call in Sheriff Miller, who does not believe them. As night falls, Tracy and Mike fall out once more before Rick tells the group that Ryan paged him, saying he had quit. Angela, upset, wanders off herself, while Tracy begins to believe something strange is happening at the camp. Tracy, Sofie, and Elvis decide to find Mike and Angela.

Mike comforts Angela, and the pair have sex. Elvis sees them and returns to Tracy and Sofie, telling them he had not found them. Mike realizes his clothes are missing before Angela discovers Ryan's body half-buried in the ground. Mike leaves as he does not want Tracy to know about him and Angela as the others turn up. Tracy, Sofie, Elvis, and Angela are taken back to camp by Sheriff Miller, who tells them they cannot leave the campsite as they are suspects in the death of Ryan. Sheriff Miller then searches for Rick and Mike while Deputy Tim and Deputy Carver take Tracy and Elvis to the showers. The deputies are knocked unconscious, while Elvis is stabbed to death and has his throat slit by the killer. Sheriff Miller returns with Rick, and suspicion soon falls on a missing Mike because his cabin has a mask.

Tracy finds a camcorder set up outside Mike's cabin the following day. She plays the footage, which shows Mike entering the house before the killer emerges moments after. Mike then appears to Tracy, who screams for help. Mike flees but is caught by the deputies and taken to prison. At night, Sofie comforts Tracy before Tracy dreams that the killer reveals himself to be Rick. In the morning, Tracy, Sofie, and Angela begin to doubt Mike is the killer and decide to recover Ryan and Rick's pagers to find out if Rick was telling the truth about the messages before Ryan's disappearance.

At the police station, Mike tells Sheriff Miller that he is innocent and someone has altered the recordings from the camcorder. Back at camp, Tracy checks Rick's pager while he is in the shower and finds that there are no pages from Ryan. At night, Sofie cooks dinner to stop Rick from becoming suspicious. While Tracy checks the recordings once more, she discovers altered footage. As Angela searches for Ryan's pager, the killer appears and strikes her in the head with a machete, killing her.

Tracy warns Sofie, who sets off to find Angela. Tracy goes into Rick's office for the keys, but Rick appears. Rick attempts to tell her of his innocence, but Tracy runs away. Meanwhile, as Sofie finds Angela's body, she is knocked unconscious. Tracy manages to phone Sheriff Miller before Rick chases her. As Rick corners her, Sheriff Miller arrives and shoots Rick. Sheriff Miller begins to drive Tracy back into town, but he reveals himself as the killer, getting revenge for what happened to his son, Trevor Moorehouse. Tracy finds Mike's dead body in the back seat before Sheriff Miller handcuffs her to a log. Sofie appears, and Sheriff Miller chases her back to the camp. Tracy frees herself and meets with Sofie at the camp. Sheriff Miller chases them. However, Trevor Moorehouse appears and decapitates him with a chainsaw and drags his corpse away. Tracy and Sofie fall asleep in the woods and walk away together the next morning.

== Cast ==
- Katy Woodruff as Tracy Hathaway
- Tyler Sedustine as Jason Hathaway
- Amanda Magarian as Sofie
- Kelly Gunning as Michael
- Tiffany Shepis as Angela
- Raymond Novarro Smith as Elvis
- Arthur Benjamin as Rick
- Tom Mullen as Ryan
- Lane Anderson as James
- Virginia Mendoza as Juanita
- John Colton as Sheriff Miller / Clayton Moorehouse
- Carl Strecker as Deputy Tim
- Benjamin Schneider as Deputy Carver

== Reception ==
John Fallon of Arrow in the Head awarded Bloody Murder 2 a score of 5/10, and opened his review of the film with, "Who knew? Like really... who knew???? Somebody up there must have listened to my prayers for this sequel to the abysmal Bloody Murder. Everything that was so painfully freakin' wrong with the original was pretty much rectified in this routine, yet surprisingly watchable, follow-up." Josh Korngut of Dread Central criticized the film's plot, which he felt was just a rehash of its predecessor's story, but went on to write, "Say what you will about this movie, but it's an absolute step up from its predecessor. As bad as it is, it's hella watchable and worlds less boring than the first film." Robert Pardi of TV Guide gave Bloody Murder 2 a score of 2/5, and opined that the film had "creative homicides" and was "marginally better than its predecessor" despite suffering from "minimal suspense and a bogus surprise ending."

In a review written for Horror News, Jay Alan offered mild praise to the film, but concluded, "If you’ve already seen the classic films of this slasher genre, you've laid eyes on the best there are to witness. This, nor does its original live up to them." While Digital Retribution's Devon Bertsch admitted that Bloody Murder 2 was better than its predecessor, he still found the film to be "lackluster" and gave it a final score of 2/5. Patrick Naugle of DVD Verdict was highly critical of the film, writing, "If you can believe it, this tepid sequel is even worse—filled with stock horror characters, bad dialogue and even worse special effects, Bloody Murder 2 plays like a student film project gone horribly awry."
