= Lights Out (Graveyard album) =

Studio album by Graveyard
- Released: 26 October 2012
- Recorded: May–August 2012
- Genre: Hard rock; psychedelic rock; folk rock
- Label: Stranded Rekords; Nuclear Blast
- Producer: Don Alsterberg

Graveyard chronology
Hisingen Blues (2011)	Lights Out (2012)	Innocence & Decadence (2015)

Professional ratings
Aggregate scores
Source	Rating
Metacritic	78/100
Review scores
Source	Rating
Classic Rock	4/5 stars
Pitchfork	7/10
The Austin Chronicle	3.5/5 stars

Lights Out is the third full-length studio album by Swedish hard rock band Graveyard. It was released on 26 October 2012.

== Release ==
Graveyard revealed an artwork for their album cover on 20 August 2012. An interactive teaser video was released by the group via YouTube on 22 October 2012.

== Track listing ==
1. An Industry of Murder (4:02)
2. Slow Motion Countdown (5:35)
3. Seven Seven (2:33)
4. The Suits, the Law & the Uniforms (4:50)
5. Endless Night (2:46)
6. Hard Times Lovin' (4:27)
7. Goliath (2:49)
8. Fool In the End (3:31)
9. 20/20 (Tunnel Vision) (5:00)

== Charts ==
=== Weekly charts ===
Chart (2012)	Peak position
Belgian Albums (Ultratop Flanders)	115
Belgian Albums (Ultratop Wallonia)	185
Finnish Albums (Suomen virallinen lista)	14
German Albums (Offizielle Top 100)	27
Norwegian Albums (VG-lista)	39
Swedish Albums (Sverigetopplistan)	3

=== Year-end charts ===
Chart (2012)	Position
Swedish Albums (Sverigetopplistan)	80
