= Innocence & Decadence =

Studio album by Graveyard
- Released: 25 September 2015
- Genre: Hard rock, psychedelic rock, folk rock
- Length: 42:00
- Label: Nuclear Blast
- Producer: Johan Lindström

Graveyard chronology
| Lights Out (2012) | Innocence & Decadence (2015) | Peace (2018) |

Innocence & Decadence is the fourth full-length studio album by Swedish hard rock band Graveyard. It was released on 25 September 2015.

== Track listing ==
1. "Magnetic Shunk" – 3:02
2. "The Apple & The Tree" – 3:04
3. "Exit 97" – 3:50
4. "Never Theirs to Sell" – 2:15
5. "Can't Walk Out" – 5:43
6. "Too Much Is Not Enough" – 4:37
7. "From a Hole in the Wall" – 3:47
8. "Cause & Defect" – 3:47
9. "Hard-Headed" – 3:12
10. "Far Too Close" – 4:43
11. "Stay for a Song" – 4:35
12. "The Hatch" (bonus track) – 3:14

== Charts ==
| Chart (2015) | Peak position |
|---|---|
| Austrian Albums (Ö3 Austria) | 47 |
| Belgian Albums (Ultratop Flanders) | 92 |
| Belgian Albums (Ultratop Wallonia) | 65 |
| Finnish Albums (Suomen virallinen lista) | 20 |
| German Albums (Offizielle Top 100) | 35 |
| Swedish Albums (Sverigetopplistan) | 2 |
| UK Independent Albums (OCC) | 25 |
| UK Rock & Metal Albums (OCC) | 12 |
