= Bloody Murder =

- VHS and DVD cover art
- Directed by: Ralph E. Portillo
- Screenplay by: John R. Stevenson
- Produced by: Jamie Elliott; Ralph E. Portillo
- Starring: Jessica Morris; Crystalle Ford; Peter Guillemette; Patrick Cavanaugh
- Cinematography: Keith Holland
- Edited by: Carlos Puente
- Music by: Steven M. Stern
- Production company: Hemisphere Entertainment
- Distributed by: Mainline Releasing; New City Releasing; Artisan Entertainment
- Release date: September 12, 2000
- Running time: 88 minutes
- Country: United States
- Language: English

Bloody Murder (also known as Scream Bloody Murder in the United Kingdom) is a 2000 American slasher film directed by Ralph E. Portillo and written by John R. Stevenson. It stars Jessica Morris, Crystalle Ford, Peter Guillemette, and Patrick Cavanaugh. The plot follows a group of counselors working at a summer camp, where a masked assailant begins a murder spree. The film was released direct-to-video.

It was followed by a sequel, Bloody Murder 2: Closing Camp (2003), and a spin-off, The Graveyard (2006).

== Plot ==
Teenage friends Julie, Jason, Dean, Whitney, and Tobe are working as summer camp counselors at Camp Placid Pines. Their boss Patrick introduces them to the other counselors Drew, Brad, Jamie and Doug. The groundskeeper, Henry, warns Julie that there is something dangerous in the woods, but Patrick dismisses him as crazy. Later that night, the counselors, around the campfire, tell the story of Trevor Moorehouse; a young camper who wore a hockey mask due other campers playing a prank on him, causing his face to become disfigured. They also play a game called "Bloody Murder", a combination of hide and seek and tag. During the game Jason and Dean play a yearly tradition camp prank on Brad with Jason dressing up as Trevor Moorehouse. Brad gets accidentally hurt during the prank. Julie scold's Jason for the prank & Jason promises to apologize to Brad in the morning. Later Jason and Whitney have sex, while Dean who happens to be Jason's best friend & Whitney's ex, watches them & is shocked because Jason is dating Julie. Then Jason is confronted by an unknown person.

The next morning, Julie is concerned about Jason's whereabouts and is told he was taking a few days off. The following night, the counselors gather to watch a movie and Whitney is killed in the kitchen by someone wearing a hockey mask and a boiler suit. The next day, the counselors inform the local sheriff that Jason and Whitney have gone missing, while Patrick and Tobe tell the sheriff that they suspect Dean, who then is taken in for questioning. At the archery range, Brad is killed and Dean is released from custody at the sheriff station. Julie is attacked by the killer in the woods before Dean is also killed by having his throat slit. Julie finds a photo of her dad at the camp with someone named Nelson Hammond, and discovers that Nelson was almost killed in an accident involving the game Bloody Murder. Few years later, he returned to the camp and killed one of the counselors involved. That night, Julie is attacked again but realizes her attacker is Jason and locks him in the freezer. Jason tries to explain but Julie has him arrested then Jason is taken in by the police.

The killer murders Doug before Julie's father arrives and walks with Drew to the lake. Julie gathers her things from her cabin and discovers that Drew's father was Bill Anderson, the counselor that Nelson killed for revenge, and concludes that Drew is the killer after she told Julie that seeks out others to blame for her father's death. Julie's father is knocked into the lake by an unknown assailant. Moments later, Julie confronts Drew and accuses her of being the killer before the real killer arrives and attacks them, proving her wrong. Drew is knocked out and Julie flees. She runs into Patrick, who reveals he is actually the killer and is really Nelson Hammond and who killed the real Patrick. He chases Julie through the woods before she arrives at the main camp, where Patrick says that Julie hit her head and is delusional. He then takes a swing at her with an axe, but Drew appears and shoots him in the arm before he is arrested for his crimes.

At the station, Sheriff says he understood in a backward way why Nelson killed Whitney, Brad & Dean but doesn't understand why he killed Doug who never did a thing to him. Nelson denies killing Doug and says Trevor Moorehouse must have been responsible. Julie's father and Drew are taken to the hospital as the remaining counselors depart the camp. As Jason is walking home alone, another hockey-masked assailant, wielding a chainsaw, suddenly comes out of the bushes. Jason screams in terror and the film ends.

== Cast ==
- Jessica Morris as Julie "Jewels" McConnell
- Peter Guillemette as Patrick / Nelson Hammond
- Patrick Cavanaugh as Tobe
- Crystalle Ford as Drew Zemke / Patricia Zemke
- Michael Stone as Dean Thompson
- Justin Ross Martin as Jason Hathaway
- Tracy Pacheco as Whitney "Whit" Chambers
- Lindsey Leigh as Jamie
- David Smigelski as Brad Thompson
- William Winter as Doug
- Michael Prohaska as Sheriff Williams
- Jerry Richards as Tommy McConnell
- Bobby Stuart as Henry

== Production ==
Filming took place in California at three different camps, which were edited to appear as one location.

== Release ==
Bloody Murder was released on VHS and DVD September 12, 2000.

=== Reception ===
Buzz McClain of AllMovie condemned the film as "infuriatingly boring" and gave it 1/5. A 1 was also awarded by John Fallon of Arrow in the Head, who wrote, "Movies like this make you realize just how good Friday the 13th and Scream are. It tries to blend both together but fails for three reasons: It has no heart, it has no brain and it has no balls. This flick is not even fun in a bad way;" and Devon Bertsch of Digital Retribution, who wrote, "The plotting can get so bad it's almost gibberish. The acting is atrocious. There are BAD fade-outs and just general fades, and poor editing for continuity and the things that need a quick pace. Too many theories as to what happened are presented visually, like some bizarre homage to the ending of Clue, or even Wayne's World. It's all bad, and the great tragedy is that it's not even funny, dammit!"

The film garnered further 1s from G. Noel Gross of DVD Talk, who referred to Bloody Murder as "less a horror movie, but more an inane whodunit with the production values of an after school special with a couple dirty words mixed in," and Robert Pardi of TV Guide, who dismissed Bloody Murder as a "generic Friday the 13th rip-off" that "is the very model of anonymous filmmaking." In a review for DVD Verdict, Patrick Naugle lambasted the film, writing, "I don't even know where to begin to talk about this movie. It's terrible. It goes beyond terrible. At least cheesy, cruddy films such as the ones Roger Corman made were enjoyable to watch for their high camp value. Bloody Murder doesn't even have that going for it."
