= Noel C. Bloom =

American businessman

- Born: Noel Christopher Bloom Sr. November 5, 1942 (age 83); United States
- Occupation: Businessman

Noel Christopher Bloom Sr. (born November 5, 1942) is an American businessman from Los Angeles. He is notable for founding entertainment and home video companies such as Artisan Entertainment, Family Home Entertainment, Celebrity Home Entertainment, Live Entertainment, Caballero Home Video, and Monterey Home Video. Three of those companies of which he founded are now owned by Lionsgate, the exceptions being Caballero (which remains self-owned), Celebrity (which has now gone defunct) and Monterey (which was purchased by BayView Entertainment in 2019). Bloom is married and has a daughter, Nicole (born 1970), and a son, Noel Jr. (born 1977).

== See also ==
- Lionsgate Home Entertainment
