= Mark Salling =

American actor and musician (1982–2018)

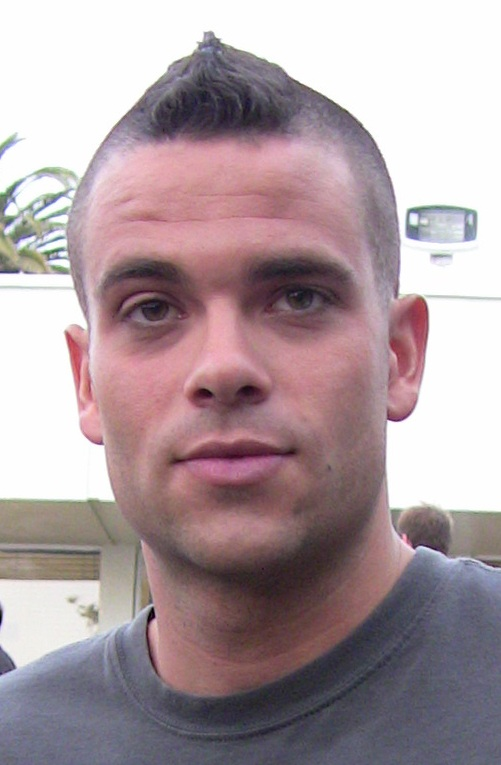
- Salling in 2009
- Born: Mark Wayne Salling; August 17, 1982; Dallas, Texas, U.S.
- Died: January 30, 2018 (aged 35); Los Angeles, California, U.S.
- Cause of death: Suicide by hanging
- Education: Culver Military Academy; Lake Highlands High School; Los Angeles College of Music
- Occupations: Actor; composer; musician
- Years active: 1996–2015
- Known for: Noah "Puck" Puckerman on Glee

Mark Wayne Salling (/ˈsɔːlɪŋ/; August 17, 1982 – January 30, 2018) was an American actor and musician known for his role as Noah "Puck" Puckerman on the television series Glee.

Salling studied at the Los Angeles College of Music before working as a guitar teacher. He also worked as an occasional actor, appearing in Children of the Corn IV: The Gathering (1996) and The Graveyard (2006) before gaining a recurring role in Glee in 2009. Initially a regular character, from the fifth season he was reduced to a recurring guest star role. On the show, he soloed and dueted on cover versions of various songs. Pursuing a music career, he established his own label, Pipe Dreams Records, in partnership with Fontana Distribution. On this label he released an album, Pipe Dreams, in 2010.

In 2015, Salling was arrested for possession of child pornography. In 2017, he pleaded guilty to the charges as part of a plea deal. He died by suicide on January 30, 2018 at the age of 35, before a sentencing hearing scheduled for March 7.

== Early life and education ==
Salling was born in Dallas, Texas, the younger of two children to John Robert Salling Jr., an accountant, and Condy Sue Salling (née Wherry), a school secretary. He was home-schooled at an early age. He attended, but did not graduate from, Culver Military Academy and later graduated from Lake Highlands High School in 2001. While in high school, he was a member of the school wrestling team. After graduating from high school, Salling attended the Los Angeles Music Academy College of Music in Pasadena, California and began studying guitar, giving guitar lessons to make a living.

== Career ==
=== Music ===
Salling sang, wrote, and produced his own music under the name Jericho. He also played the piano, guitar, bass guitar, and drums. Jericho's debut album Smoke Signals was released on February 8, 2008 by Jericho Records. On October 25, 2010, Salling released a rock/jazz album, Pipe Dreams, which was inspired by Alice in Chains, Nine Inch Nails, Miles Davis, and Herbie Hancock. It was released by Pipe Dreams Records, Salling's own label, in partnership with Fontana Distribution. He was the composer, performer, and producer of each track. The first single, "Higher Power", premiered on August 10, 2010.

On the television show Glee, he soloed and dueted on cover versions of various songs, including "Sweet Caroline", "Only the Good Die Young", "The Lady Is a Tramp", "Run Joey Run", "Beth", "Just Give Me a Reason", "Good Vibrations", and "Fat Bottomed Girls". During filming, Salling paid tribute to the cast of Glee by writing a song and creating a video titled "Chillin' on Glee", which featured various cast and crew members.

=== Acting ===
Salling acted in Children of the Corn IV: The Gathering (1996) and The Graveyard (2006). In 2008, he was cast as Noah "Puck" Puckerman on the Fox series Glee. On June 28, 2013, it was reported that Salling would not be returning as a regular on Glee's fifth season, but would instead be a recurring guest star on the series.

== Personal life ==
Salling dated Glee co-star Naya Rivera from 2007 to 2010, and Playboy model DJ Roxanne Dawn from 2010 to 2011. He resided in Shadow Hills, Los Angeles, California.

Salling was a longtime member of the Echo Park Ornithology Club in Los Angeles and even penned its theme song. The president and founder of the organization said that Salling "really enjoyed birdwatching a lot, and he really cared about birds... he had a lot of animals at his house and he worked at an animal rescue when I knew him. We went birdwatching together."

=== Legal issues ===
==== Sexual assault charges ====
In January 2013, Salling's ex-girlfriend Roxanne Gorzela accused him of committing sexual battery on March 25, 2011, by having unprotected sex without her knowing that it was unprotected. He denied the charges and filed a counter-suit for defamation of character. In March 2015, Salling settled with Gorzela out of court and agreed to pay her $2.7 million.

==== Child pornography charges ====
On December 29, 2015, Salling was arrested at his Los Angeles home on suspicion of possessing several thousand photos and videos depicting child pornography, following a tip-off to the police from one of his ex-girlfriends. He was released later on a $20,000 bail, but a search pursuant to a warrant found more than 50,000 images of child pornography, downloaded between April and December 2015, on his computer and USB flash drives.

On May 27, 2016, he was charged with receiving and possessing child pornography. As a result of the charges, Salling was removed from the cast of Adi Shankar's film Gods and Secrets, later renamed The Guardians of Justice.

On September 30, 2017, he pleaded guilty to possession of child pornography as part of a plea deal, which was expected to result in Salling being sentenced to four to seven years in jail, in addition to registering as a sex offender and entering a treatment program, among other conditions. The guilty plea was formalized on December 18, 2017, and Salling's sentencing date was set for March 7, 2018.

== Death ==
Salling hanged himself on January 30, 2018, near his home in the Sunland area of Los Angeles. His body was found six hours after he was reported missing. The manner of his death was confirmed by the Los Angeles coroner's office and his death was ruled a suicide. He was cremated. Because Salling died before sentencing, the plea agreement's restitution of $50,000 to ten individuals who had been identified in his illicit holdings was not paid out.

== Filmography ==
=== Film ===
Year	Title	Role	Notes
1996	Children of the Corn IV: The Gathering	James Rhodes	Direct-to-video
2006	The Graveyard	Eric	Direct-to-video
2011	Glee: The 3D Concert Movie	Noah "Puck" Puckerman/Himself	

=== Television ===
Year	Title	Role	Notes
1999	Walker, Texas Ranger	Billy	Episode: "Rise To The Occasion"
2009–2015	Glee	Noah "Puck" Puckerman	Main role (seasons 1–4); Recurring role (seasons 5–6); 81 episodes Screen Actors Guild Award for Outstanding Performance by an Ensemble in a Comedy Series (2009); Nominated—Screen Actors Guild Award for Outstanding Performance by an Ensemble in a Comedy Series (2010); Nominated—Screen Actors Guild Award for Outstanding Performance by an Ensemble in a Comedy Series (2011); Nominated—Screen Actors Guild Award for Outstanding Performance by an Ensemble in a Comedy Series (2012); Nominated—Teen Choice Award for Choice TV: Breakout Star Male (2010); Nominated—Teen Choice Award for Choice Music: Group (2010) (shared with Glee Cast); Nominated—Choice TV: Scene Stealer Male (2011)
2010	The X Factor	Himself	Special guest
2011	The Glee Project	Himself	Episode: "Sexuality"
2014	Rocky Road	Harrison Burke	TV movie

== Discography ==
=== Studio albums ===
Year	Album details	Peak chart positions		
Year	Album details	US	US Heat	US Indie
2008	Smoke Signals (released under stage name Jericho): Released: February 8, 2008; Label: Jericho Records; Formats: CD, digital download	—	—	—
2010	Pipe Dreams: Released: October 25, 2010; Label: Fontana, Pipe Dreams Records; Formats: CD, digital download	189	5	29
"—" denotes releases that did not chart.

=== Singles ===
Year	Title	Album
2010	"Higher Power"	Pipe Dreams

== See also ==
- List of solved missing person cases (2010s)
