= Artisan Entertainment =

Defunct American film studio

Artisan Entertainment, Inc.
- Formerly: U.S.A. Home Video (1983–1987); International Video Entertainment, Inc. (1984–1990); LIVE Entertainment (1988–1998)
- Type: Subsidiary
- Industry: Film; Home video
- Founded: 1983; 43 years ago
- Founder: Noel C. Bloom
- Defunct: December 15, 2003; 22 years ago
- Fate: Acquired by and folded into Lions Gate Entertainment, Inc.
- Successor: Lionsgate Studios
- Headquarters: 15400 Sherman Way, Van Nuys, California (1986–1998); 2700 Colorado Ave, Santa Monica, California (1998–2004)
- Parent: Family Home Entertainment (1983–1984); NCB Entertainment Group (1984–1987); Carolco Pictures (1987–1993); Bain Capital (1997–2003)
- Divisions: Artisan Pictures; Artisan Television; Artisan Home Entertainment; Artisan Digital Media; Family Home Entertainment iArtisan; FHE Kids; VCL

Artisan Entertainment (formerly known as U.S.A. Home Video, International Video Entertainment (IVE) and LIVE Entertainment) was an American film studio and home video company. It was founded in 1983 and was considered one of the largest mini-major film studios until it merged with later mini-major film studio Lions Gate Entertainment on December 15, 2003. At the time of its acquisition, Artisan had a library of thousands of films developed through acquisition, original production, and production and distribution agreements. Its headquarters and private screening room were located in Santa Monica, California. It also had an office in Tribeca in Manhattan, New York.

The company owned the home video rights to the film libraries of Republic Pictures, ITC Entertainment, Gladden Entertainment, Miramax Films, Hemdale Film Corporation, The Shooting Gallery, and Carolco Pictures before it became defunct.

Artisan's releases included Requiem for a Dream, Pi, Killing Zoe, The Blair Witch Project, Grizzly Falls, Startup.com, Novocaine, and National Lampoon's Van Wilder.

== History ==
=== 1980s ===
Unlike most movie studios, Artisan had its roots in the home video industry. The company was founded in 1980 by Noel C. Bloom as Family Home Entertainment, Inc., and it was initially operated as a subsidiary of adult film distributor Caballero Control Corporation. It received a distribution pact with Wizard Video. In 1982, the latter had sold 10,000 copies of The Texas Chainsaw Massacre a week. Also in 1982, the label started distributing titles by Monterey Home Video. Later on, it received a distribution deal with MGM/UA Home Video to distribute the latter's library. In 1983, it received a new agreement with Filmation to distribute their library on videocassette.

In 1983, FHE began operating a new subsidiary, U.S.A. Home Video, when tapes were usually packaged in large boxes and included non-family films such as Supergirl, Silent Night, Deadly Night, several Lorimar titles and many B-movies. It also published titles under the Adventure Video label, which began and ended with B-actress Sybil Danning talking about the film in question, and also released sports videos under the U.S.A. Sports Video label.

In 1984, FHE and U.S.A. became part of Noel Bloom's NCB Entertainment Group (which also included Bloom's other labels Caballero Home Video, Monterey Home Video and Thriller Video), and then later that year, both were consolidated into International Video Entertainment, Inc., formed under NCB and also taking ownership of Monterey and Thriller Video. The IVE name was used for non-family releases (although the U.S.A. name continued until 1987) and the FHE name was used for family releases. Also that year, Bloom launched Concept Productions to develop live programming. In the late 1980s, the company also branched out into film distribution for television.

In 1987, IVE was acquired by Carolco Pictures from NCB Entertainment after Carolco had taken a minority interest in the latter a year earlier. That year, it secured a deal with MCA Distributing Corporation to handle distribution of its titles. The unrated release of Angel Heart was the first Carolco film released by IVE on video. The studio hired José Menendez, previously of RCA, as head of IVE; he was responsible for creating product deals with Sylvester Stallone's White Eagle Enterprises and producer Edward Pressman. In 1989, Menendez and his wife were murdered by their two sons. Also in the same year, Noel C. Bloom left IVE after disputes with Carolco, to start Celebrity Home Entertainment, with some of IVE's employees defecting to the new company. Later in 1987, the company had acquired the assets of home video distributor Vista Home Video from The Vista Organization for $38 million.

In 1988, IVE and FHE were consolidated into LIVE Entertainment after a merger with wholesale media distributor Lieberman Enterprises. LIVE formed new ventures outside the home video business, including ownership of retail music and video chains across the East Coast, after the acquisitions of such stores as Strawberries and Waxie Maxie, and its Lieberman subsidiary acquired Navarre Corporation. It partnered with distributor Radio Vision International in 1988 to launch a music-oriented label, Radio Vision Video.

=== 1990–1997 ===
In 1990, IVE became LIVE Home Video. Carolco formed its own home video division under a partnership with LIVE. The company also formed Avid Home Entertainment, which reissued older LIVE products, as well as ITC Entertainment's back catalogue, on videocassette at discount prices (held to a $15 price point); this division was based out of Denver, Colorado and had their own sales force to better distinguish themselves from their parent company. In 1990, LIVE acquired German video distributor VCL.

LIVE Entertainment also branched out into film production. The company spent more than a million dollars to finance the 1992 film Reservoir Dogs, which marked the feature directorial debut of Quentin Tarantino. Other films included Paul Schrader's Light Sleeper. On January 11, 1991, Live announced that it would acquire Vestron, Inc. for $24 million after its downfall; Vestron had been known best for Dirty Dancing, which had been the second highest-grossing independent film of all time. Vestron releases continued into 1992.

Much of LIVE's earnings were partially thanks to Carolco's investment in the company, but by 1991, the studio was in such debt that a plan to merge the two companies was called off that December; around that time, the Lieberman assets were sold to another video distributor, Handleman, in an effort to stem LIVE's financial bleeding. In May 1992, its distribution agreement with Uni Distribution Corporation expired, and LIVE signed a deal with Warner-Elektra-Atlantic. The following month, LIVE defaulted on their debt payments; Carolco reduced their stake in LIVE concurrently (from a majority share of 53% to 49.9%), selling minority shares in LIVE to a group of investors led by Pioneer Electronic Corporation.

Despite their best efforts, in February 1993 LIVE was forced to file for Chapter 11 bankruptcy due to insufficient cash flow; as a part of this deal, Pioneer acquired 30% of LIVE's voting stock (Carolco was also restructuring, and their stake in LIVE was further reduced to 35%). In August 1994, Carolco and LIVE plotted another merger attempt, but the plans fell apart once again that October. Under new CEO Roger Burlage, the unprofitable retail assets were sold and more focus was placed upon film production (Burlage took the inspiration for this new business plan from his previous employer, Trimark Pictures). In 1996, when Carolco ceased to exist as a company, StudioCanal got full rights to their film library; LIVE, under a new deal with the French-based production company, continued to distribute Carolco's films on video. LIVE also took control of its video sales at this time from WEA; WEA continued to handle distribution of its products.

=== 1997–2003 ===
In July 1997, LIVE was acquired by Bain Capital and taken private. Though Burlage was retained as chairman initially, a new trio of executives took power: former International Creative Management agent Bill Block and former October Films partner Amir Malin became co-presidents, while former Bain Capital financial consultant Mark Curcio handled financial matters. Their goal was to utilize the large video library and the consistent profit from that area to invest in independent film production, which they saw as a market in flux in the wake of several notable independent film companies, including Orion Pictures, Miramax Films and others, being subsumed into larger corporate organizations; going along with this, LIVE's existing film production unit was shuttered. As part of the restructuring process, in April 1998, LIVE was rebranded as Artisan Entertainment; the rebranding was in part motivated by LIVE's reputation for mediocre product and lingering memories of their connection to the Menendez brothers case. The company headquarters was moved from Van Nuys, California to oceanfront offices in Santa Monica, while the company's New York branch office relocated to the TriBeCa neighborhood.

On December 18, 1997, LIVE entered a domestic home video deal with Hallmark Entertainment to handle the distribution of products from its Hallmark Home Entertainment subsidiary, including Crayola-branded releases and Hallmark Hall of Fame movies. These releases would be distributed under Family Home Entertainment, while Hallmark Home Entertainment would retain marketing rights. By 1998, products from Cabin Fever Entertainment were added to the deal after Hallmark purchased and folded the company in March of that year.

In August 1998, the distribution deal with WEA expired and was replaced by a new distribution deal with 20th Century Fox Home Entertainment. In addition to adding more theatrical releases, the company's home video subsidiary, Artisan Home Entertainment, continued to expand with more home video deals. The company began releasing products from TSG Pictures around this time, and by September 1998, Artisan signed a deal with Spelling Entertainment Group to distribute films from its Republic Pictures unit for home video release throughout a five-to-ten-year period. This was followed in October 1999 with a four-year home video deal with Discovery Communications to release programming from the Discovery Channel, Animal Planet and TLC networks through dedicated labels under Family Home Entertainment.

On February 10, 2000, Artisan acquired a minority stake in The Baby Einstein Company in exchange for a three-year North American home video distribution agreement for the Baby Einstein catalog. The deal was eventually revoked early at the end of 2001 following The Walt Disney Company's purchase of The Baby Einstein Company. In May 2000, Marvel Studios negotiated a deal with Artisan Entertainment for a co-production joint venture that included rights to 15 Marvel characters including Captain America, Thor, the Black Panther, Iron Fist, and Deadpool. Artisan would finance and distribute while Marvel would developing licensing and merchandising tie-ins. The resulting production library, which would also include television series, direct-to-video films and internet projects, would be co-owned.

On September 13, 2000, Artisan launched Artisan Digital Media and iArtisan. The last major deal Artisan undertook that year was their renewal of a distribution pact with Canadian media firm Alliance Atlantis, which included distribution rights to Artisan product in Canada, and theatrical distribution of Artisan films in Britain via AAC's Momentum Pictures unit. In 2001, the company acquired Canadian film and television company Landscape Entertainment. In May 2003, Artisan and Microsoft jointly announced the first release of a high definition DVD, Terminator 2: Judgment Day (Extreme Edition). The release was a promotion for the Windows Media version 9 format; it could only be played on a personal computer with Windows XP. Artisan had released the movie in 2002 on D-VHS.

In the summer of 2003, Marvel Enterprises placed an offer for Artisan, with then-Disney-owned and Weinstein-operated Miramax Films to provide backing for Marvel's bid. On December 15, 2003, Lions Gate Entertainment Corporation would merge with Artisan for $220 million, and video releases through Artisan were re-released under the Lionsgate Home Entertainment banner.

== Filmography ==
=== As LIVE Entertainment ===
Release date	Title	Notes
October 23, 1992	Reservoir Dogs	Distributed by Miramax Films
July 30, 1993	Tom and Jerry: The Movie	American co-distributor with Miramax Films; co-production with Turner Entertainment and Film Roman
September 17, 1993	Frauds	Co-production with J&M Entertainment and Latent Image Productions
February 4, 1994	Gunmen	American co-distributor with Dimension Films; co-production with Davis Entertainment
July 8, 1994	Pentathlon	
January 19, 1995	Mutant Species	Co-production with Southern Star Studios
April 28, 1995	Top Dog	
April 28, 1995	Little Odessa	distributed by Fine Line Features
June 2, 1995	Out-of-Sync	Co-production with United Image Entertainment
September 9, 1995	Blood and Donuts	Co-production with Daban Films and The Feature Film Project
April 19, 1996	The Substitute	Distributed by Orion Pictures
May 31, 1996	The Arrival	Distributed by Orion Pictures
August 2, 1996	Phat Beach	Distributed by Orion Pictures
September 17, 1996	Deadly Outbreak	Co-distributed by Nu Image Films
October 11, 1996	Trees Lounge	Distributed by Orion Pictures
February 7, 1997	Hotel de Love	Co-production with Village Roadshow Pictures and Pratt Films
March 7, 1997	The Grotesque	
September 19, 1997	Wishmaster	
October 31, 1997	Critical Care	Co-production with Village Roadshow Pictures, Mediaworks, and ASAQ Film Partnership
November 18, 1997	Joyride	Co-production with Trillion Entertainment
December 19, 1997	Open Your Eyes	Co-production with Redbus Film Distribution
February 27, 1998	Caught Up	Co-production with Heller Highwater Productions
April 17, 1998	Suicide Kings	Co-production with Dinamo Entertainment

=== As Artisan Entertainment ===
Release date	Title	Notes
June 24, 1998	I Went Down	Co-production with BBC Films, Bord Scannán na hÉireann, Irish Film Board, Raidió Teilifís Éireann, Easkel Media, Treasure Entertainment, and Shooting Gallery
July 10, 1998	Pi	Produced by Protozoa Pictures; distribution only; owned by A24
September 16, 1998	Permanent Midnight	Co-production with JD Productions
October 1998	Dark Harbor	Co-productions with Killer Films
October 2, 1998	Strangeland	Produced by Shooting Gallery, Snider Than Thou Productions, Raucous Releasing, and Behaviour Communications; distribution.
October 13, 1998	Butter	Co-production with HBO Films, CineTel Pictures, Buttler Films, and World International Network
October 14, 1998	The Cruise	Produced by Charter Films; distribution only; owned by Oscilloscope Laboratories
November 4, 1998	Belly	Co-production with Big Dog Films
November 6, 1998	Arrival II	Co-production with Rootbeer Films and Taurus 7 Film Corporation
November 25, 1998	Ringmaster	Co-production with Motion Picture Corporation of America and The Kushner-Locke Company
January 29, 1999	The 24 Hour Woman	Produced by Shooting Gallery; distribution
February 26, 1999	The Breaks	
April 9, 1999	Foolish	Co-production with No Limit Films
May 18, 1999	Ghost Dog: The Way of the Samurai	Distribution only
June 4, 1999	Buena Vista Social Club	U.S. distribution only
July 30, 1999	The Blair Witch Project	produced by with Haxan Films; U.S. distribution
August 25, 1999	The Ninth Gate	U.S. distribution only, co-production with Le Studio Canal +
September 10, 1999	Stir of Echoes	
October 8, 1999	The Minus Man	Produced by TSG Pictures, distribution only
October 8, 1999	The Limey	
November 5, 1999	Grizzly Falls	Co-production with Providence Entertainment
November 30, 1999	Candyman 3: Day of the Dead	
March 21, 2000	Hot Boyz	Distribution only
July 14, 2000	Chuck & Buck	U.S. distribution only
August 11, 2000	Cecil B. Demented	Produced by Le Studio Canal+ and Polar Entertainment; U.S. distribution only
August 15, 2000	Premonition	
September 8, 2000	The Way of the Gun	
September 12, 2000	Bloody Murder	
October 13, 2000	Dr. T & the Women	U.S. Distribution only
October 27, 2000	Book of Shadows: Blair Witch 2	Co-production with Haxan Films
October 27, 2000	Requiem for a Dream	Co-production with Thousand Words and Protozoa Pictures
December 1, 2000	Panic	
January 21, 2001	Nobody's Baby	Co-production with Millennium Films, SE8 Group and Front Street Pictures
April 19, 2001	The Center of the World	Co-production with Redeemable Features
May 9, 2001	'R Xmas	
May 25, 2001	Startup.com	Produced by Artificial Eye and Noujaim Films; distribution only
July 13, 2001	Made	
August 17, 2001	Double Bang	
September 7, 2001	Soul Survivors	
September 8, 2001	Novocaine	
October 23, 2001	Deep in the Woods	
November 13, 2001	Ticker	Co-production with Nu Image Films, Filmwerks, Kings Road Entertainment and Emmett/Furla Films
December 14, 2001	Vanilla Sky	Produced by Paramount Pictures, Cruise/Wagner Productions, Vinyl Films, Sogecine, and Summit Entertainment; studio credit only
January 6, 2002	Sins of the Father	Co-production with Landscape Entertainment and FX
February 14, 2002	Book of Love	Co-production with Crossroads Pictures
April 5, 2002	Van Wilder	Produced by Myriad Pictures and Tapestry Films; U.S. distribution only.
July 2, 2002	Chat Room	Co-production with Megastar Pictures and Inverness Media
July 23, 2002	Con Express	Co-production with PM Entertainment; U.S. theatrical distributor
September 24, 2002	The Pool	American distribution only
October 4, 2002	Jonah: A VeggieTales Movie	Produced by Big Idea Productions and FHE Pictures; U.S. distribution only; owned by Universal Pictures
October 18, 2002	Children on Their Birthdays	Co-production with Crusader Entertainment, Frantic Redhead Productions, and Salem Productions; co-distributed by Koch Media and Moonstone Entertainment
October 25, 2002	Roger Dodger	Produced bv Holedigger Films; distribution only
November 15, 2002	Standing in the Shadows of Motown	
January 3, 2003	Final Examination	Produced by Franchise Pictures, Epsilon Motion Pictures, Hawaii Filmwerks and Royal Oaks Entertainment; distribution only
February 18, 2003	Bloody Murder 2: Closing Camp	
February 19, 2003	Amandla!: A Revolution in Four-Part Harmony	
March 21, 2003	Boat Trip	Produced by Nordisk Film and Motion Picture Corporation of America; U.S. distribution only
May 20, 2003	The Shaft	Distribution only
July 13, 2003	Blue Hill Avenue	Produced by Asiatic Pictures, Cahoots Productions, and Den Pictures; distribution only
July 22, 2003	Guilty by Association	
August 5, 2003	Step into Liquid	
August 19, 2003	I've Been Waiting for You	
September 12, 2003	Dummy	Produced by Quadrant Entertainment and Dummy Productions LLC; distribution only
October 10, 2003	House of the Dead	American distribution only
December 16, 2003	Devil's Pond	Co-production with Davis Entertainment Filmworks, and Splendid Pictures
February 27, 2004	Dirty Dancing: Havana Nights	Picked up by Lionsgate Films, and produced with Miramax Films, A Band Apart, Lawrence Bender Productions, and Havana Nights LLC
April 16, 2004	The Punisher	Picked up by Lionsgate Films and produced with Marvel Entertainment and Valhalla Motion Pictures; Columbia Pictures handled international rights distribution
April 30, 2005	Man-Thing	Picked up by Lionsgate Films and produced by Marvel Entertainment, Fierce Entertainment and Screenland Movieworld; the last film by Artisan

=== Television films ===
Release date	Title	Network	Notes
August 25, 2002	RFK	FX	Co-production with Fox Television Studios
March 9, 2003	Return to the Batcave: The Misadventures of Adam and Burt	CBS	Co-production with Fox Television Studios and The Kaufman Company
