= The Graveyard (film) =

- Theatrical release poster
- Directed by: Michael Feifer
- Written by: Michael Hurst
- Produced by: Michael Feifer
- Starring: Christopher Stewart; Mark Salling; Lindsay Ballew
- Cinematography: Hank Baumert Jr.
- Edited by: Christopher Roth
- Production company: MRG Entertainment
- Distributed by: Lightning Entertainment; Lions Gate Films
- Release date: June 27, 2006
- Running time: 83 minutes
- Country: United States
- Language: English

The Graveyard is a 2006 American slasher film written by Michael Hurst, directed by Michael Feifer and starring Patrick Scott Lewis. It is the third and final installment of the Bloody Murder series and a spin-off. The project was filmed in California.

== Plot ==
A group of friends (Jack, Allie, Sarah, Charlie, Michelle, and Eric) head to the Placid Pines Cemetery for a midnight game of hide and seek. Eric is chosen to be the seeker, and begins to count with his eyes closed as the friends spread out. As he opens his eyes, he sees a masked, knife-wielding man approaching. In fear, he begins to run away, looking back to see the masked man stab one of his friends. He keeps running and slips, impaling himself on protruding bars in the cemetery fence. As he bleeds to death, the friends gather around, with the masked man revealing himself as Bobby, the seventh friend. Their practical joke has gone horribly wrong.

Five years later, Michelle testifies at Bobby's probation hearing; apparently, Bobby was charged with manslaughter while the other friends were let off. Michelle, Bobby's former lover, has organized a reunion of the friends at a campsite near the Placid Pines Cemetery in hopes of bringing closure to the horrific accident that occurred earlier. Bobby is reticent as we learn the status of the other friends, clearly upset at having served time for a joke everyone else was in on. The friends meet up at the campsite (with Veronica, Jack's girlfriend), where they are greeted by the groundskeeper, Peter Bishop, with whom Michelle strikes a good rapport. Meanwhile, in an isolated shed, we see a bloodied man tied to a chair, awakening only to be brutally hacked to pieces by a masked assailant.

The group reunites, with Bobby making his disdain apparent to everyone. The group decides to try to relax until dinner, and it is revealed that Eric's family died a short while after Eric's death—victims of an arson. After sex with Jack is cut short due to premature ejaculation, his girlfriend wanders off to take a shower. She is attacked and brutally murdered by a masked assailant. The group then tries to locate her, and, soon after, Jack is attacked by a masked man. His screams draw the others close, but it is revealed that the masked man is Bobby, who is chided for not having not learned his lesson. A light tone returns, though Veronica is still missing, as the group returns to the camp. However, Allie and Jack are killed in short order, and as their bodies are discovered, chaos descends on the surviving friends. Bobby heads for town and is arrested, as the sheriff is on the lookout for a murderer—a body was located in the woods earlier. Charlie accidentally electrocutes Sarah, and is subsequently bitten in the eye by a rattlesnake planted by the murderer. Peter and Michelle frantically realize they are alone with the killer.

The sheriff releases Bobby upon confirming his identity and heads out to scour the woods again. Before Bobby leaves, he sees an incoming fax that reveals the identity of the body found in the woods: Peter Bishop. Back at the camp, "Peter" reveals that he is Adam, Eric's brother. A psychopath, he burned down his home, using Eric's exhumed body as his own to fake his death. He takes Michelle to the cemetery and tells her to run, much like in the hide-and-seek game in which Eric died. He stalks her, but she is saved by Bobby's timely return. Adam is shot, but as the police close in, they are unable to locate his body. Some time later, Bobby and Michelle are escorted into a police car. They sit back, glad to be safe. The driver enters, and we see in the rear-view mirror that he is none other than Adam.

== Cast ==
- Lindsay Ballew as Michelle
- Patrick Scott Lewis as Bobby
- Trish Coren as Allie
- Erin Reese as Sarah (as Erin Lokitz)
- Markus Potter as Peter Bishop / Adam Morris
- Christopher Stewart as Charlie
- Mark Salling as Eric
- Sam Bologna as Sheriff
- Eva Derrek as Veronica
- Leif Lillehaugen as Jack
- Natalie Denise Sperl as Zoe
- Brett Donowho as Camper
- Jasmes Gallinger as Bailiff

== Reception ==
Mitchell Hattaway of DVD Verdict panned the film, finding it to be "...boring, illogical in the extreme, and inept", and summarizing his review by writing The Graveyard "is the worst slasher flick I've ever seen". Andre Manseau reviewed the film for JoBlo and noted that the "characters are painful stereotypes (as per usual), and the acting is at best, passable", concluding the film was forgettable.

== Release ==
The film had its video release in June 2006, a TV release in Italy in May 2007, and DVD release in Japan in April 2008.

== Notes ==
In an interview with FearNet broadcast in February 2007, it was noted that original plans were for Peter Bishop to be named "Adam Ericsborough" (Adam, Eric's "Bro") in a tongue-in-cheek homage to the cult classic I Still Know What You Did Last Summer, in which one of the characters is named "Will Benson" (Will, Ben's son). However, this was scrapped at the last minute because it was felt that the "reveal" would be more comedic than dramatic, since "borough" and "bro" are not similar-sounding enough.
