= Family Home Entertainment =

American home video company

- Type: Division
- Industry: Home video
- Founded: 1980; 46 years ago
- Founder: Noel C. Bloom
- Defunct: 2005; 21 years ago
- Fate: Rebranded as Lionsgate Family Entertainment
- Successor: Lionsgate Family Entertainment
- Headquarters: Thousand Oaks, California, United States
- Parent: NCB Entertainment Group (1984–1987); Artisan Entertainment (1985–2003); Lions Gate Entertainment (2003–2005)
- Divisions: Family Home Entertainment Kids; FHE Pictures
- Website: www.familyhoment.com (archived 07/26/2002)

Family Home Entertainment (FHE) was an American home video company founded in 1980 by Noel C. Bloom. It was a division of International Video Entertainment, which had its headquarters in Newbury Park, California.

== History ==
The company was founded by Noel C. Bloom as a direct opposite to an earlier company he founded, Caballero Home Video, which was a pioneering video distributor of hardcore adult fare. FHE released children's and family-oriented programming, most notably popular 1980s television cartoons, including The Transformers, G.I. Joe, Jem, ThunderCats, Inspector Gadget, Defenders of the Earth, Pound Puppies, the original Teenage Mutant Ninja Turtles animated series, Gumby, Clifford the Big Red Dog, Care Bears, Highlander: The Animated Series (as the compilation film Highlander: The Adventure Begins), and Bucky O'Hare and the Toad Wars!, and other non-animated shows like Baby Einstein. FHE was one of the two distributors for most of the seasonal Rankin/Bass television specials aired on CBS, a relationship that began in 1989. The other distributor for this library was Vestron Video, a now-defunct company which was later acquired by FHE's then-parent Live Entertainment in 1991. The company however lost the home video rights to the Rankin/Bass library in 1998 to Sony Wonder and Golden Books Family Entertainment. The company also released several VHS releases of British kids' cartoons and animation in the US (i.e., Roobarb, Wil Cwac Cwac, James the Cat and Fireman Sam), as well as some Japanese anime, such as Robotech and The Adventures of Ultraman, plus the Australian Dot films. Their output was not strictly targeted at children and families; in the early '80s, several titles were released under the "World of Horror" label directly by FHE, including Journey into the Beyond and The Child (which was later rebranded as a Monterey Home Video release). Beginning in 1982, they also released Filmation's television shows such as Lassie's Rescue Rangers, The Lone Ranger, Shazam!, Blackstar, and The New Adventures of Zorro, plus the only Filmation film released at the time, Journey Back to Oz.

Early FHE releases were distributed by MGM/UA Home Video, including the very first release of few episodes of Gumby. In the late 1980s, FHE's releases were distributed by MCA (most notably in Canada).

In 1982, the company introduced USA Home Video as a non-family division of the company. Two years later, both FHE and USA became part of Noel Bloom's NCB Entertainment Group (which also included Bloom's other labels Caballero Home Video, Monterey Home Video, Thriller Video, USA Sports Video and later Celebrity Home Entertainment), and in 1985, they were reorganized into International Video Entertainment (which then changed its name to Live Entertainment years later), with "Family Home Entertainment" as a kids and family imprint of IVE/Live. Throughout the 1990s, Family Home Entertainment Theatre was used as a banner for full-length, family-friendly films Live had the rights to; certain FHE titles were also reprinted by Live's budget video brand Avid Home Entertainment. FHE continued as a sub-label of Live through its rebranding as Artisan Entertainment in 1998 and formed another imprint, FHE Kids. By the early 2000s, FHE had begun to concentrate on new direct-to-video material in addition to pre-existing television shows and films, including the Barbie film series, Crayola Home Entertainment product and Baby Einstein (until the rights to that franchise were acquired by Disney). It also had a one off theatrical release division, FHE Pictures, established in 2002; its first and only release was Jonah: A VeggieTales Movie. Ultimately, the brand was discontinued in 2005 by new owner Lionsgate (who had purchased Artisan in 2003), as the division restructured into Lionsgate Family Entertainment (an internal name only; from that point forward, all family-oriented releases carried the standard Lionsgate branding).
