= Graveyard (game) =

Children's game aimed at teaching volunteering habit

Graveyard is a game most commonly played by children on the playground, or at parties. It is often initiated by one or more persons with prior knowledge of the rules and is usually played with several others who are unaware of them. The game is very simple and is most commonly used only as a means to select one of the participants for a task they would not be willing to perform voluntarily.

== Gameplay ==
Graveyard is initiated when one of the participants declares "Graveyard". Once begun, the only rule of the game is that the first person to speak is the loser. Most often, one of the participants unaware of the purpose of the game will immediately ask for the rules to be clarified, thus losing the game. If all participants are aware of the rules at the start of the game, the purpose becomes to not be the first to give in and speak voluntarily.

== Purpose ==
Graveyard is most often used to assign one of the players to a task that none would agree to do voluntarily. For example, if none of the guests at a party where alcohol is being consumed willingly volunteer to be the designated driver, one might suggest to play Graveyard as a means to select one. Alternatively, the game might be played to select an unwilling participant for a less than desirable position in a subsequent game. As an example, it may be used as a means to select one player to be "It" in a game of tag if none are willing to volunteer.

== See also ==
- List of games with concealed rules
