= Graveyard (album) =

Studio album by Graveyard
- Released: September 10, 2007 / February 19, 2008
- Recorded: April 2007
- Genre: Hard rock, psychedelic rock, folk rock
- Length: 39:40
- Label: Transubstans Records / TeePee Records
- Producer: Graveyard & Don Ahlsterberg

Graveyard chronology
Graveyard (2007)	Hisingen Blues (2011)

Professional ratings
Review scores
Source	Rating
allmusic	3.5/5 stars

Graveyard is the debut studio album by Swedish hard rock band Graveyard, released on September 10, 2007 by Swedish label Transubstans Records and February 19, 2008 on American label TeePee Records. The album received good reviews and critical acclaim.

== Track listing ==
1. "Evil Ways" – 3:28
2. "Thin Line" – 5:24
3. "Lost in Confusion" – 3:23
4. "Don't Take Us for Fools" – 4:02
5. "Blue Soul" – 6:17
6. "Submarine Blues" – 2:25
7. "As the Years Pass By, the Hours Bend" – 4:41
8. "Right Is Wrong" – 4:27
9. "Satan's Finest" – 5:31
