= Hisingen Blues =

Studio album by Graveyard
- Released: 25 March 2011
- Genre: Hard rock, psychedelic rock, folk rock, blues rock
- Length: 39:28
- Label: Nuclear Blast; Warner Music Group
- Producer: Don Ahlsterberg

Graveyard chronology
Graveyard (2007)	Hisingen Blues (2011)	Lights Out (2012)

Hisingen Blues is the second full-length studio album by Swedish hard rock band Graveyard. It was released on 25 March 2011.

== Reception ==
Professional ratings
Aggregate scores
Source	Rating
Metacritic	72/100
Review scores
Source	Rating
AllMusic	4/5 stars
Blabbermouth.net	9/10
Classic Rock	4/5 stars
PopMatters	7/10

Scott Alisoglu of Blabbermouth.net said that Hisingen Blues "is too hot to handle without flame retardant gloves" and " is in fact just what the doctor ordered".

== Track listing ==
- All Songs Written by Graveyard.
1. "Ain't Fit to Live Here" - 3:05
2. "No Good, Mr. Holden" - 4:46
3. "Hisingen Blues" - 4:13
4. "Uncomfortably Numb" - 6:11
5. "Buying Truth (Tack och förlåt)" - 3:27
6. "Longing" - 4:49
7. "Ungrateful Are the Dead" - 3:09
8. "Rss" - 3:48
9. "The Siren" - 6:00
10. "Cooking Brew" (digipak edition bonus track) - 4:05

== Personnel ==
=== Graveyard ===
- Joakim Nilsson: Guitars, Vocals
- Jonatan Larocca Ramm: Guitars
- Rikard Edlund: Bass
- Axel Sjoberg: Drums, Percussion

=== Additional Musicians ===
- Nils Dahl: Piano
- Peteus Fredestad: Hammond B-3

== Charts ==
=== Weekly charts ===
Chart (2011)	Peak position
German Albums (Offizielle Top 100)	78
Swedish Albums (Sverigetopplistan)	1

=== Year-end charts ===
Chart (2011)	Position
Swedish Albums (Sverigetopplistan)	60
