= Caballero Home Video =

American pornographic film studio

- Founded: 1974; 52 years ago United States
- Founder: Noel C. Bloom
- Headquarters: Canoga Park, California, U.S.
- Website: www.caballerovip.com

Caballero Home Video is an American independent pornographic film studio, based in Canoga Park, California founded by Noel C. Bloom. It was previously known as Caballero Control Corporation. The company was founded in 1974, making it one of the oldest U.S. porn studios still in existence. Caballero (meaning "gentleman" in Spanish) was one of the largest studios during the Golden Age of Porn, and produced several of the best-selling and most critically acclaimed pornographic films of the 1980s and early 1990s. Its dominance of the adult video market saw it called the "General Motors of Porn". Its films starred some of the most successful and best known performers of the period, such as Marilyn Chambers, Seka, Amber Lynn, Stacey Donovan, Ginger Lynn, John Holmes, Joey Silvera, Traci Lords, Nina Hartley, Ron Jeremy and Christy Canyon. Previous company Presidents include Al Bloom. Throughout the 1980s it was awarded hundreds of thousands of dollars in damages due to its films being illegally pirated. It also acquired the U.S. rights to rival studio Cal Vista's entire catalogue of more than 150 films. Caballero is a contributor to the Free Speech Coalition.

Throughout the early 1980s, Caballero expanded its holdings launching several labels like Family Home Entertainment (a label used for non-adult releases) and U.S.A. Home Video, as well as Monterey Home Video, but both U.S.A. and Family was absorbed into Lionsgate, and Monterey became a standalone label, using the NCB Entertainment Group moniker by 1984.

== Ben and Jerry's lawsuit ==
In September 2012 Vermont-based ice cream maker Ben & Jerry's filed a lawsuit against Caballero for copyright infringement. The lawsuit was filed in US District Court in Manhattan on September 5, and claims that the sale of 10 "exploitative, hardcore pornographic" movies in Caballero's "Ben & Cherry's" line harms the reputation of Ben & Jerry's Homemade Inc. by linking it with pornography.

The lawsuit was settled on July 29, 2013, with Caballero agreeing not to sell products that make reference to Ben & Jerry's products.

== Films ==
Caballero was responsible for many of the classic films of the "Golden Age of Porn". Some of these films are:

=== Insatiable ===
Insatiable is a classic pornographic movie released in 1980, at the close of the era of 'porn chic' in the US. It starred Marilyn Chambers and was directed by Stu Segall (credited as "Godfrey Daniels"). It was followed by a sequel, Insatiable II.

=== Traci, I Love You ===
Traci, I Love You was Traci Lords' final adult film, in addition to being the only of her films to be made after her 18th birthday. It was produced in Cannes, France, two days after her 18th birthday, making it the only one of her credited titles legally available in the United States, due to child pornography laws. This movie has provided another aspect of controversy to Lords' life. It was the third and final film by her eponymous production company. She subsequently sold her rights to the film.

== Awards ==
The following is a selection of some of the major awards Caballero films have won:

- 1988 AVN Award – 'Top Selling Release of the Year' for Traci, I Love You
- 1988 AVN Award – 'Best Film' for Careful, He May be Watching
- 1989 AVN Award – 'Top Selling Release of the Year' for Miami Spice II
- 1990 AVN Award – 'Top Selling Release of the Year' for The Nicole Stanton Story
- 1990 AVN Award – 'Best Film' for Night Trips
- 1991 AVN Award – 'Top Selling Release of the Year' for House of Dreams
- 1991 AVN Award – 'Best Film' for House of Dreams
