= Graveyard (band) =

Swedish hard rock band

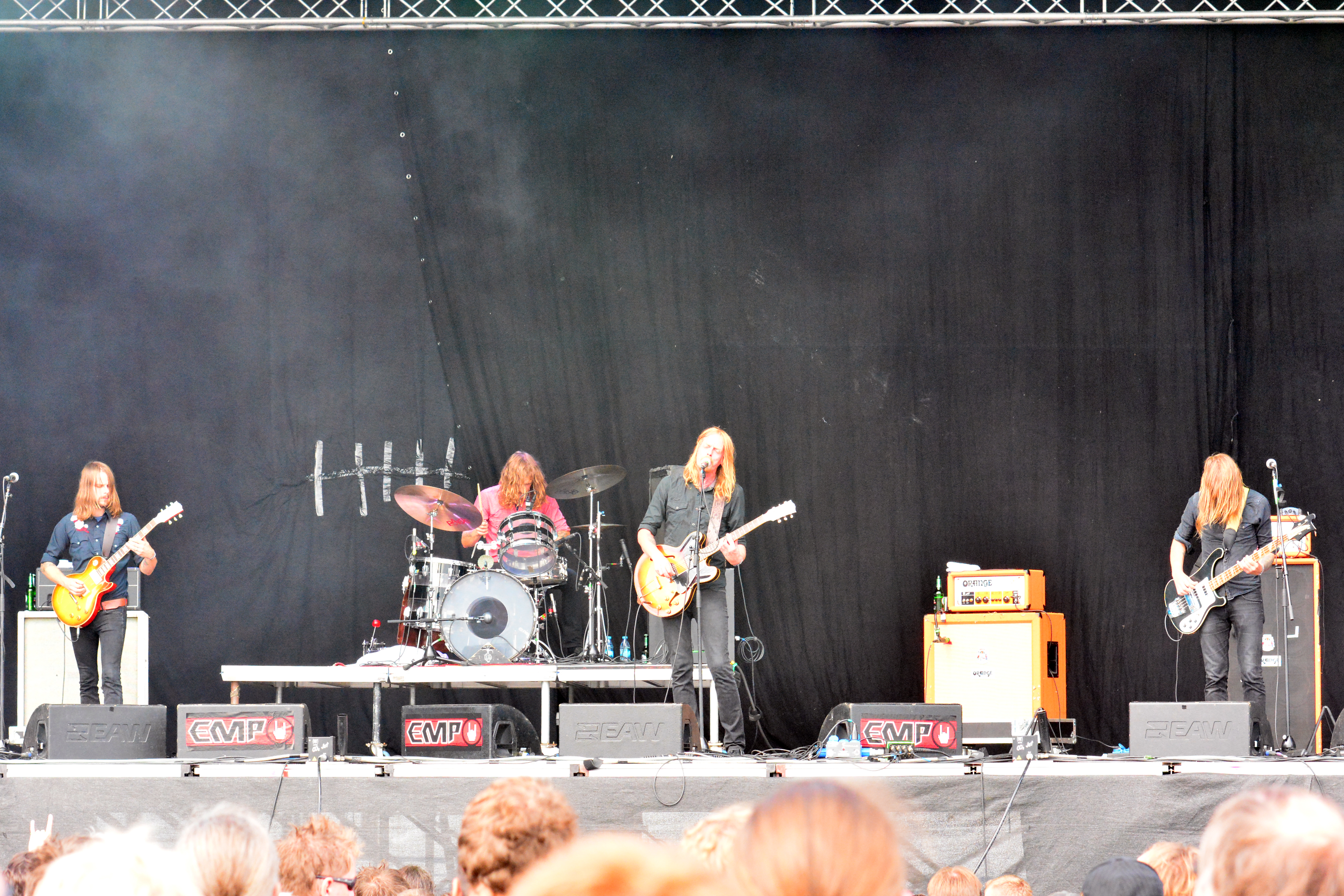
- Graveyard at Elbriot, 2014

Background information
- Origin: Gothenburg, Sweden
- Genres: Hard rock, neo-psychedelia, psychedelic rock, blues rock, occult rock
- Years active: 2006–2016, 2017–present
- Labels: TeePee / Transubstans (past), Nuclear Blast (present)
- Members: Joakim Nilsson; Truls Mörck; Oskar Bergenheim
- Past members: Jonatan Ramm; Rikard Edlund; Axel Sjöberg

Graveyard is a Swedish hard rock band from Gothenburg, formed in 2006.

== History ==
Joakim Nilsson, Rikard Edlund (both formerly of Norrsken), Axel Sjöberg, and Truls Mörck formed Graveyard in 2006. When Norrsken disbanded in 2000, guitarist Magnus Pelander went on to form doomy folk metal act Witchcraft and Nilsson and Edlund joined Albatross, a growly blues rock band whose lineup also included Sjöberg on drums. Initially, they considered Albatross a hobby project, but after five years the members began taking their music more seriously and had grown dissatisfied with the direction their sound had taken. When Albatross broke up, Nilsson and Edlund decided that for their next venture, they would head back towards their roots as musicians and songwriters. Nilsson explains, "I am a singer, but in Albatross I only played guitar. Rikard played guitar but he is a bass player. We also wanted a more straightforward [rock] sound."

Together with Sjöberg and guitarist/singer Truls Mörck (not to be confused with Truls Mørk) they began practicing as Graveyard. Upon their initial formation, Graveyard quickly recorded a two track demo, played a total of three shows, and began planning for a full-length album with Swedish label Transubstans Records. In the meantime, they posted a demo of some of their material on Myspace. Songs from the band's Myspace caught the ear of Tony Presedo, founder of Tee Pee Records. Their self-titled debut album was recorded by Don Ahlsterberg and released in early 2008. On the recording sessions' completion, Truls Mörck was replaced by guitarist Jonatan Ramm. The debut album received generally good reviews. Graveyard performed at the 2008's South by Southwest Music Festival.

Graveyard was featured on Rolling Stone's Fricke's Picks for their first ever US gig at SXSW. After SXSW, Graveyard toured with label mates Witch. In the fall of 2008 Graveyard toured with Witchcraft and then Clutch. In 2009 they toured with the rock band CKY. Graveyard released their second album in spring of 2011. In 2013, they toured Europe with Soundgarden. In October 2014, the band announced that bass player and co-founder Rikard Edlund was leaving the band to "pursue other musical ventures".

In September 2015, the band released the full-length album Innocence & Decadence through Nuclear Blast.

In September 2016, the band announced they had broken up, citing, "all so classic reasons." Graveyard announced their reunion in January 2017, with a new drummer as drummer Axel Sjöberg decided to stay with his new band. A new album titled Peace was released on 25 May 2018.

== Band members ==
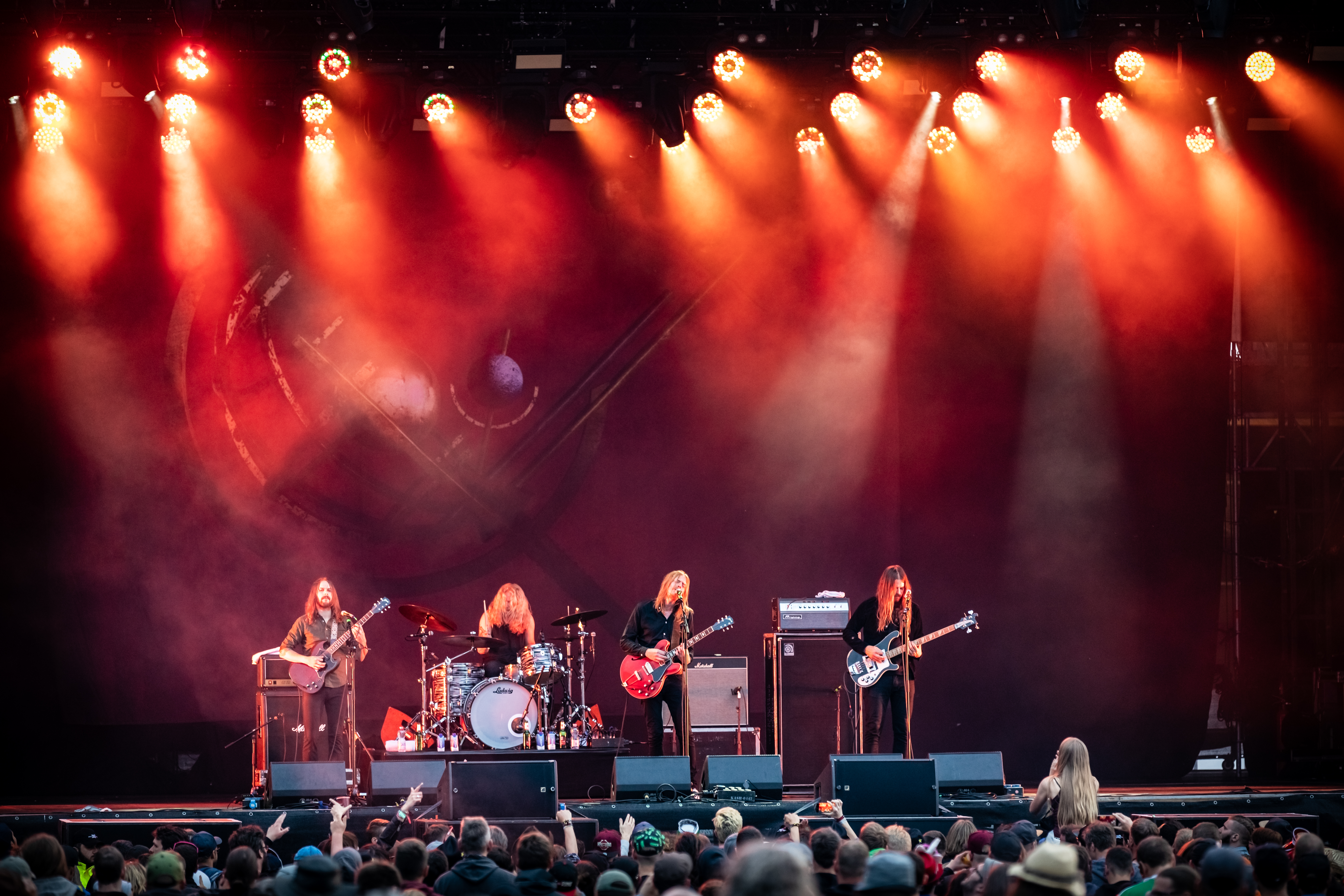
Graveyard live at Rock am Ring 2019

Current members

- Joakim Nilsson – guitar, vocals
- Truls Mörck – bass, vocals
- Oskar Bergenheim – drums

Former members

- Jonatan Larocca-Ramm – guitar, vocals
- Rikard Edlund – bass
- Axel Sjöberg – drums

== Discography ==
=== Albums ===
Title	Album details	Peak chart positions
Title	Album details	SWE
Graveyard	Released: 10 September 2007; Label: Transubstans; Re-released: 19 February 2008; Label: Tee Pee; Format: CD, LP	27
Hisingen Blues	Released: 25 March 2011 (Europe); Released: 19 April 2011 (North America); Label: Nuclear Blast; Format: CD, LP	1
Lights Out	Released: 26 October 2012 (Europe); Released: 6 November 2012 (North America); Label: Nuclear Blast; Format: CD, LP	3
Innocence & Decadence	Released: 25 September 2015; Label: Nuclear Blast; Format: CD, LP	2
Peace	Released: 25 May 2018; Label: Nuclear Blast; Format: CD, LP	1
6	Released: 29 September 2023; Label: Nuclear Blast; Format: CD, LP	14
Fever	Released: 9 October 2026; Label: Nuclear Blast; Format: CD, LP	8

=== EPs and singles ===
- "Ancestors / Graveyard" – Split 7" (Volcom Entertainment, 2009)
- "Hisingen Blues" – 7" single (2011)
- "Goliath" – 7" single (Nuclear Blast, 2012)
