= Ballet Theatre of Maryland =

Organization based in Annapolis, Maryland, US

Coordinates: 38°58′26″N 76°30′20″W

Ballet Theatre of Maryland is based in Annapolis, Maryland. Originally established as The Ballet Theatre of Annapolis, the organization was founded in November 1978 as a private non-profit corporation governed by a twelve-person Board of Trustees, with Eddie Stewart as the first artistic director, and established professional residency at Maryland Hall for the Creative Arts in Annapolis in 1980. In 1996, the company achieved full-time status for its dancers. In 2000, the organization's name was changed to Ballet Theatre of Maryland, Inc. (BTM) to fulfill a new mission of serving the State of Maryland. Dianna Cuatto joined BTM as artistic director at the start of the 2003–2004 season. The current artistic director, Nicole Kelsch, was appointed for the start of the 2020–2021 season after being a Principal Dancer, School Principal, and Ballet Mistress for 14 years.

2024-2025 season includes,

- Napoli (October 25-27, 2024)
- The Nutcracker (November 24, December 14-22, 2024)
- Ground and Sky (February 2, 2025)
- Momentum: A Mixed Bill (March 29, 2025)
- Swan Lake (April 25-26, 2025)

2025-2026 season includes,

- Giselle (October 17-19, 2025)
- The Nutcracker (December 13-21, 2025)
- Momentum: A Mixed Bill (February 13-14, 2026)
- La Esmeralda (April 24-25, 2026)

== Dancers ==
=== The Company ===
As of August 2022:

=== Principals ===
- Lindsey Bell
- Emily Carey
- Alexander Collen
- Karissa Kralik
- Lauren Martinez
- Ryan Massey

=== Soloists ===
As of August 2022:

- Aaron Bauer
- River Byrd
- Cindy Case
- Isaac Martinez
- Victoria Siracusa
- Michael West Jr.

=== Demi-Soloists ===
As of August 2022:

- Caroline Anderson
- Amanda Cobb
- Carrie Cornelius
- Anne Gutcher
- Hannah Hanson
- Cassandra Hope
- Sarah Jung
- Brenna Mazzara
- Clara Molina
- Madison Sweeney
- Rowan Treece
- Catherine Welch

=== Apprentices ===
As of August 2022:

- Destiny Billot
- Karen Fleming
- Olivia Fohsz
- Jenna Fritts
- Meredith Hardin
- Sarah Hoffman
- Madeline Jones
- Mia Koshansky
- Emma Lane
- Audrey Martin
- Rachael Spicer
- Julia Walden
- Victoria Walpole
- Isabella Warshaw

=== Trainees ===
As of August 2022:

- Arielin Anderson
- Samantha Apgar
- Jillian Battle
- Louisa Belian
- Kristen Faraclas
- Gabriella Femia
- Lauren Geary
- Ellie Goods
- Emily Moreland
- Kathryn Muscarella
- Addison Palmer
- Eliza Sell

== Ballet Theatre of Maryland's School ==
BTM's School of Classical and Contemporary Dance, founded in 1978, is the only school in Maryland with a fully comprehensive classic and contemporary ballet training program for beginning through pre-professional and apprentice students of dance. Classes are currently offered in Annapolis and Grasonville, MD.

The school's professional faculty trains students from an anatomically based syllabus in styles from such schools as the American Ballet Theatre, Ballet West, Connecticut Ballet Theatre, Richmond Ballet, Royal Danish Ballet, and San Francisco Ballet.
