= Baby Einstein =

American edutainment franchise

- Logo used since 2018
- Type: Subsidiary
- Industry: Early child entertainment
- Founded: 1996; 30 years ago
- Founder: Julie Aigner-Clark
- Headquarters: Atlanta, Georgia, U.S.
- Parent: Family Home Entertainment (2000–2001; minority stake); The Walt Disney Company (2001–2013); Kids II, Inc. (2013–present)
- Website: www.babyeinstein.com

Baby Einstein (stylized in all lowercase) is an American franchise and line of multimedia products, including home video programs, CDs, books, flash cards, toys, and baby gear that specialize in interactive activities for infants and toddlers under three years old, created by Julie Aigner-Clark. The franchise is produced by The Baby Einstein Company (formerly known as I Think I Can Productions).

The videos show babies and toddlers simple patterns, puppet shows, and familiar objects, such as everyday items, animals, and toys that are often accompanied by reorchestrated classical music written by composers such as Wolfgang Amadeus Mozart, Ludwig van Beethoven, Johann Sebastian Bach, Antonio Vivaldi, Johannes Brahms, George Frideric Handel, and many others, as well as traditional nursery rhymes and sometimes famous artworks by Vincent van Gogh, Claude Monet, Leonardo da Vinci, Edgar Degas, etc. The video series is also known for its puppets, which are all animals who seldom speak, mostly communicating in simple sounds and their respective animal noises.

The Baby Einstein Company has also released a companion series aimed at preschoolers, titled Little Einsteins, which in a similar fashion teaches young children classical music and music appreciation. Clark eventually made another sister show called WeeSchool in 2013 to 2018.

Baby Einstein was introduced to the public in 1996, and remained a small company until Clark sold it to Disney. Between November 7, 2001, and October 13, 2013, Disney owned and operated the Baby Einstein brand. Starting on October 14, 2013, Kids II, Inc. owns and operates the Baby Einstein brand.

Baby Einstein videos were produced by Family Home Entertainment, Artisan Entertainment and The Walt Disney Company.

== History ==
The Baby Einstein Company was founded in 1996 by former teacher and stay-at-home mom Julie Aigner-Clark at her home in suburban Alpharetta, Georgia, as I Think I Can Productions. According to an interview with Julie Dunn, she wanted her babies to be exposed to classical music, poetry, colors, shapes, and more. Julie and her husband borrowed video equipment and invested $15,000 of their own savings to produce the initial product, a VHS cassette they named Baby Einstein and later sold as Language Nursery in 2001 to avoid confusion with the Baby Einstein brand as a whole.

The original video shows a variety of toys and visuals interspersed with music, stories, numbers, and words spoken in seven different languages: English, French, Spanish, Japanese, German, Hebrew, and Russian. Eventually, the video was marketed across the United States, Europe, Asia, and Australia. It even won the 1997 Parenting Magazine award for Best Video of the Year. More videos followed like Baby Mozart and Baby Bach, with some videos featuring the Clarks' two daughters, Aspen and Sierra, as well as other children.

It quickly became a multimillion-dollar franchise; its revenue grew from $1 million in 1998 to $25 million in 2001. Julie Aigner-Clark renamed the company as Aigner-Clark Productions in 1998, as when Julie and her family and her company moved from Georgia and relocated to Denver, Colorado, then renamed the Baby Einstein Company the following year in 1999, and on February 10, 2000, Artisan Entertainment announced they had acquired a minority stake in the company in exchange for a North American home video distribution agreement under the FHE Kids sub-label of Family Home Entertainment, as well as DVD distribution.

On November 6, 2001, The Walt Disney Company announced they had acquired The Baby Einstein Company for an undisclosed amount. Julie Aigner-Clark stepped down from directing Baby Einstein videos after Baby Beethoven in 2002. Disney rereleased the first eight Baby Einstein videos previously distributed by FHE Kids in 2002–03, and then rereleased all the Aigner-Clark videos with some alterations in 2004. These changes were mainly done with the toy scenes and some titular changes in the credits.

The concept and popularity of Baby Einstein expanded as a Disney property. Educational toys and additional videos were developed. Baby Einstein was also the source of inspiration for a preschool-aimed television series called Little Einsteins, created by the Disney-owned Baby Einstein Company and animated by Curious Pictures. The series began with a direct-to-video film in August 2005, with regular episodes airing on Playhouse Disney starting in October of that year.

The success of Baby Einstein was estimated to be nearly $400 million based on revenues. Julie was named "Entrepreneur of the Year" and won various awards, and one in three U.S. households with babies were found to own at least one Baby Einstein product. It received positive media and Aigner-Clark appeared on the Oprah Winfrey Show, Good Morning America, The Today Show, and USA Today, among others. President George W. Bush mentioned the Baby Einstein Company in his 2007 State of the Union Address, which Aigner-Clark was invited to attend.

In 2008, Clark, along with actress Jennifer Garner, hosted a tenth anniversary party for Baby Einstein. Clark had also announced plans to launch a toddler brand called Einstein Pals, along with a new Baby Einstein video. But it was all abandoned for reasons unknown.

As a result of Baby Einstein being named after Albert Einstein, royalties had to be paid to Corbis which compensates the Einstein estate. This made Einstein one of the top five earning deceased celebrities.

On October 14, 2013, The Walt Disney Company announced they had sold the Baby Einstein brand to Kids II, Inc., a longtime licensee of the property. However, Disney retained total ownership of the Little Einsteins intellectual property, with the series continuing further reruns on Disney Jr. until March 18, 2019, before being added to Disney+ upon its launch on November 12 of that year.

== Controversies ==
=== FTC complaint ===
In May 2006, the Campaign for a Commercial-Free Childhood (CCFC) filed a complaint with the U.S. Federal Trade Commission (FTC) against the Baby Einstein Company and similar companies for false advertising. The CCFC alleged false advertising based on an American Academy of Pediatrics recommendation that children under two should be discouraged from watching television. It also cited studies showing that only 6% of parents were aware of that recommendation, whereas 49% thought educational videos were very important in children's intellectual development. In December 2007, the FTC closed the complaint, noting that some of the CCFC's claims did not raise issues under the FTC's substantiation rules. The FTC also considered the redesign of the Baby Einstein website, which removed certain product testimonials and product descriptions, as well as the company's promise to make sure that advertising claims about products' educational and developmental value would be properly substantiated.

=== Language development ===
A 2010 study published in Psychological Science demonstrated that children who viewed the videos regularly for one month, with or without their parents, "showed no greater understanding of words from the program than kids who never saw it". On the other hand, children who were taught by their parents improved the most; researchers speculated that this was probably because children learn best "through meaningful gestures and interactive communication with parents". In response to these new findings, Disney offered refunds to parents whose children did not see improvement, even though Bob Iger, CEO of the Walt Disney Company, demanded a retraction (of the press release) when a similarly unsupportive study was announced in 2007.

The 2007 study, based on telephone interviews with parents, had been published in the Journal of Pediatrics and resulted in a lawsuit by the company's founders due to widespread negative media coverage stemming from the article. The press release announcing the study explained that for each hour spent watching baby DVDs/videos, infants understood on average six to eight fewer words than infants who did not watch them. The University of Washington researchers Frederick Zimmerman, Dimitri Christakis, and Andrew Meltzoff had claimed that, among infants aged 8 to 16 months, exposure to "baby DVDs/videos" such as "Baby Einstein" and "Brainy Baby" was strongly associated with lower scores on a Communicative Development Inventory, a standard language development test. The Baby Einstein Company expressed "serious concerns about the many contradictions" in the study. Although University of Washington President Mark Emmert rejected Disney's claims, in 2010, the university settled with the founders, paying out $175,000 in back legal fees and turned over the study's data to the Baby Einstein founders.

In March 2008, the Journal of Pediatrics released a study by Harvard University and the Boston Children's Hospital's Center on Media and Child Health showing that television viewing is, “neither beneficial nor deleterious to child cognitive and language abilities” for children under 2, in a study that examined all television rather than just education DVDs for babies. In January 2010, the founders requested that a judge order the University of Washington to release records for the 2007 study, saying, “Given that other research studies have not shown the same outcomes, we would like the raw data and analytical methods from the Washington studies so we can audit their methodology, and perhaps duplicate the studies". In 2013, the original dataset was reanalyzed by independent scholars who concluded that it was safest to suggest that baby videos had minimal impact on language development and that linking baby videos to decreased language development was not well supported by the data.

== See also ==
- List of Baby Einstein videos
