= Kids II, Inc. =

American Toy Company

Kids2, Inc.
- Formerly: Pansy Ellen Products, Inc.; Kids II
- Company type: Private
- Founded: 1969; 57 years ago
- Headquarters: Atlanta, Georgia, U.S.
- Key people: Ryan Gunnigle (CEO)
- Brands: Bright Starts, Baby Einstein, Ingenuity
- Owner: Ryan Gunnigle
- Number of employees: 800
- Website: www.kids2.com

Kids2, Inc., doing business online as Kids2, is a global infant, baby, and toddler toy and gear manufacturer headquartered in Atlanta, Georgia. The company's brand portfolio includes Bright Starts, Baby Einstein, Ingenuity, and SwaddleMe by Ingenuity. Kids2 spans globally with more than 12 offices, including a fully owned and operated factory, on four continents, serving customers in more than 90 countries. In 2026, Kids2 has more than 500 products under its brands.

Ryan Gunnigle is the company's CEO.

== Brands ==
Kids2 manages several distinct consumer brands targeted at different family needs within the infant, baby and toddler categories. Bright Starts focuses on toys and gear emphasizing sensory exploration and early movement, including play gyms, bouncers, and activity toys for home use. Ingenuity centers on baby gear such as rockers, swings, seats, and feeding products designed for everyday routines. In 2013, Kids2 also acquired Baby Einstein, expanding its presence into educational toys and media-based learning products.

== History ==
The company was originally named Pansy Ellen Products, and was founded in 1969 primarily as an infant bath and toy manufacturer. In 1992, the company debuted its products in Toys "R" Us stores. The company re-branded in 1993 and changed its name to Kids II, Inc. Kids2 began licensing for Disney in 1999.

In 2001, Kids2 opened its first international office in Hong Kong. The company expanded to Mexico, the United Kingdom, Australia, China, Japan, and Canada by 2006

The Savannah College of Art and Design (SCAD) partnered with the company in December, 2010. The partnership allowed SCAD students to conceptualize and prototype toy concepts for the company. The firm acquired the Oball and Taggies brands the following year.

In 2012, the company relocated its headquarters from Alpharetta, to Atlanta. The company's new office space and showroom were a finalist in the design category for Atlanta Business Chronicle's 2012 Best in Atlanta Real Estate Awards. The company was also a finalist in the 2011 Georgia Family Business Awards in the large business category.

The Atlanta Business Chronicle named Kids II one of the best places to work in Atlanta in 2013.

In October 2013, Kids 2 acquired Baby Einstein, formerly owned by The Walt Disney Company. Baby Einstein products use real world objects, music, art, animals and nature with the intention to introduce infants to the world around them.

In April 2019, Kids2 announced a recall of 700,000 inclined baby sleepers sold under a variety of different brand names and models. In August 2019, Kids II announced a name change to Kids2 and opened a new factory in China.

In July 2022, Kids 2 acquired a public company, Summer Infant, out of Woonsocket, RI. Summer Infant is now a wholly owned subsidiary of Kids2 and part of the Kids2 Group.

== Operations ==
Kids2 operates a portfolio that includes toys, early-development products, baby gear, and content programs positioned for infants and toddlers. The company maintains design and commercial operations in the United States and sources manufacturing primarily through their owned facility in Jiujiang, China. Products are distributed globally through major retailers and e-commerce platforms, and the company has incorporated direct-to-consumer functions as part of its commercial model since the late 2010s.

In 2018, 2022, 2023, and 2025, Kids2 was named one of Atlanta's top 50 Private Companies.

In November 2018, Kids2 launched Kids2.com, a resource for early stage parents.

In 2019, Kids2 opened a vertically-integrated manufacturing facility in Jiujiang, China.

In November 2024, Kids2 launched shop.Kids2.com, a direct-to-consumer marketplace and marketing engine featuring Kids2 products from Baby Einstein, Bright Starts, and Ingenuity.

In July 2025, Kids2 opened their first Northeast US office in Providence, Rhode Island.

Kids2 has approximately 800 employees worldwide in 12 offices.
