= Grammy Award for Best Music Film =

Award for concert/performance films or music documentaries

- Awarded for: Quality long form music videos
- Country: United States
- Presented by: National Academy of Recording Arts and Sciences
- First award: 1984
- Currently held by: Music by John Williams — John Williams (Laurent Bouzereau, Sara Bernstein, Justin Falvey, Darryl Frank, Brian Grazer, Ron Howard, Meredith Kaulfers, Kathleen Kennedy, Frank Marshall, Steven Spielberg & Justin Wilkes) (2026)
- Website: grammy.com

The Grammy Award for Best Music Film is an annual accolade for performers, directors, and producers of quality videos or musical programs. It is presented at the Grammy Awards, a ceremony established in 1958 when it was called the Gramophone Awards.

== Criteria ==
Honors in several categories are presented at the ceremony annually by the National Academy of Recording Arts and Sciences of the United States to "honor artistic achievement, technical proficiency and overall excellence in the recording industry, without regard to album sales or chart position". In order to qualify for this category, concert/performance films or music documentaries must be released theatrically or for sale to the public for the first time or first appearing on television or online during the current eligibility year. Dramatic feature films and biopics are not eligible.

Prior to 2024, films were only considered eligible for this category if they featured a minimum of 51% performance-based material. As of the 66th Annual Grammy Awards, this requirement has been removed entirely.

== Background ==
The category was preceded by the Grammy Award for Video of the Year, which was presented in 1982 and 1983, awarding long form videos (or video albums as they were known back then) in the budding music video market. Along with the similar honor Grammy Award for Best Short Form Music Video, this award was first presented in 1984. From 1984 to 1985, the accolade was known as Best Video Album, but in 1986, it was renamed to Best Music Video, Long Form. From 1998 to 2012, it was named Best Long Form Music Video, before changing to Best Music Film since 2013.

In 1988 and 1989, the award criteria were changed and the video accolades were presented under the categories Best Concept Music Video and Best Performance Music Video. The awards were returned to the original format in 1990. Except in 1988 and 1989, the Grammy Award for Best Long Form Music Video recipients included the artists, directors, and producers associated with the winning videos. The Best Music Film category is one of two categories in the Best Music Video/Film Field. The other one is Best Music Video, which recognizes stand-alone videos of one song or performance. In 2024, the Field was abolished and both categories were moved to a Children's, Comedy, Audio Book Narration & Storytelling, Visual Media & Music Video/Film Field.

== Multiple wins and nominations ==
Singers Madonna and Sting hold the record for the most wins as a performer in this category, with two each, while there have been three films about the Beatles among the winners. However, in two instances, the Beatles were not recognized as individual winners. To date, three directors won the award twice: David Mallet, Jonas Akerlund and Bob Smeaton. Beyoncé holds the record for the most nominations with five. The British pop rock group Eurythmics and Coldplay hold the record for the most nominations as a performer without a win, with three each. Although Beyoncé also held four losing nominations, she won with her fourth nomination with Homecoming in 2020.

== Recipients ==
In 1984 and 1985, only the artists were presented with an award. In 1986 the award went to the artist(s) and the video director(s). From 1987 onwards, the award has been presented to the artist(s) (when applicable), video director(s) and video producer(s). (Nominations from 1984 to 1986 listed performing artists only).

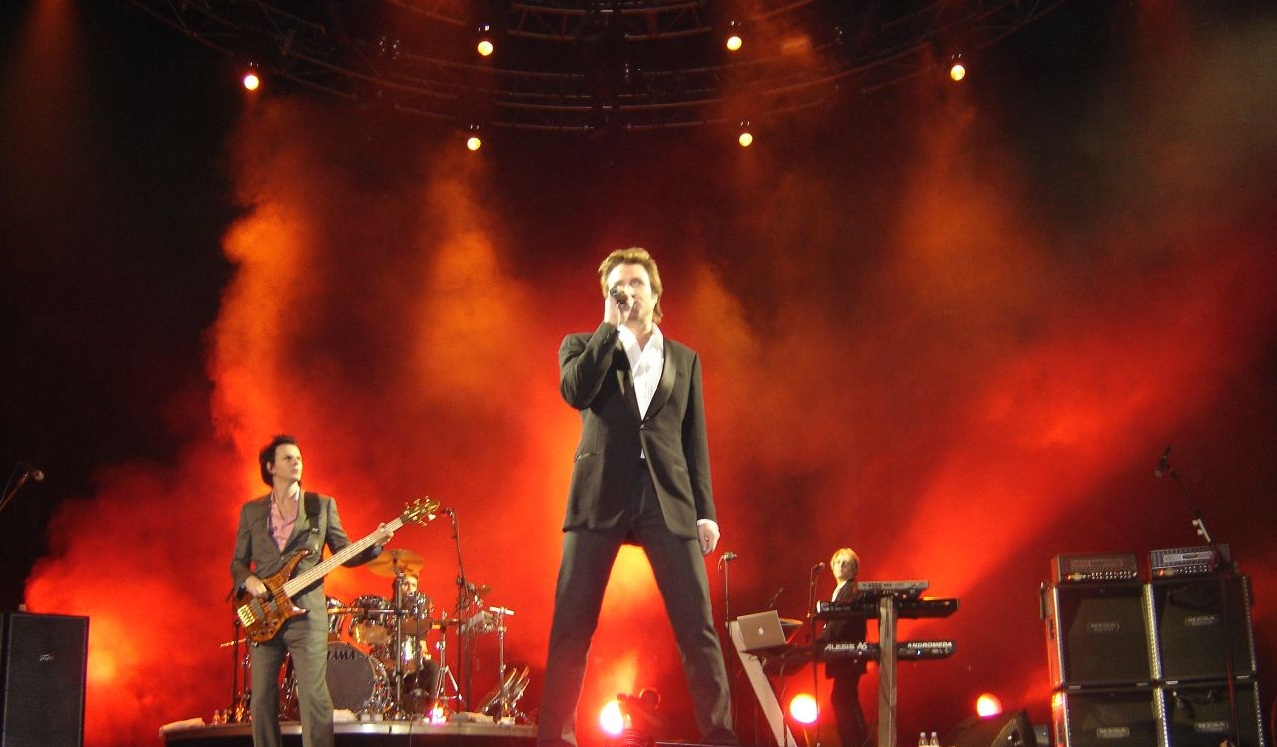
Members of the English new wave group Duran Duran, among recipients of the 1984 accolade for Duran Duran, performing in 2005.

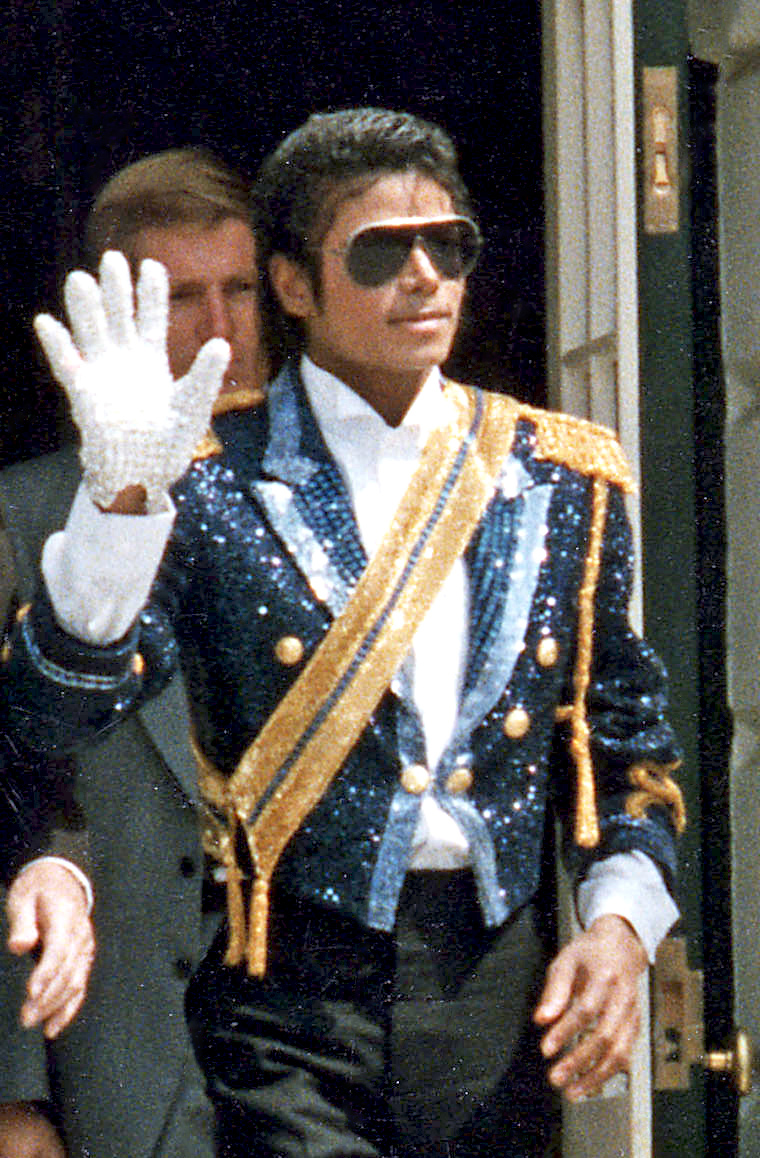
1985 winner for Making Michael Jackson's Thriller, Michael Jackson

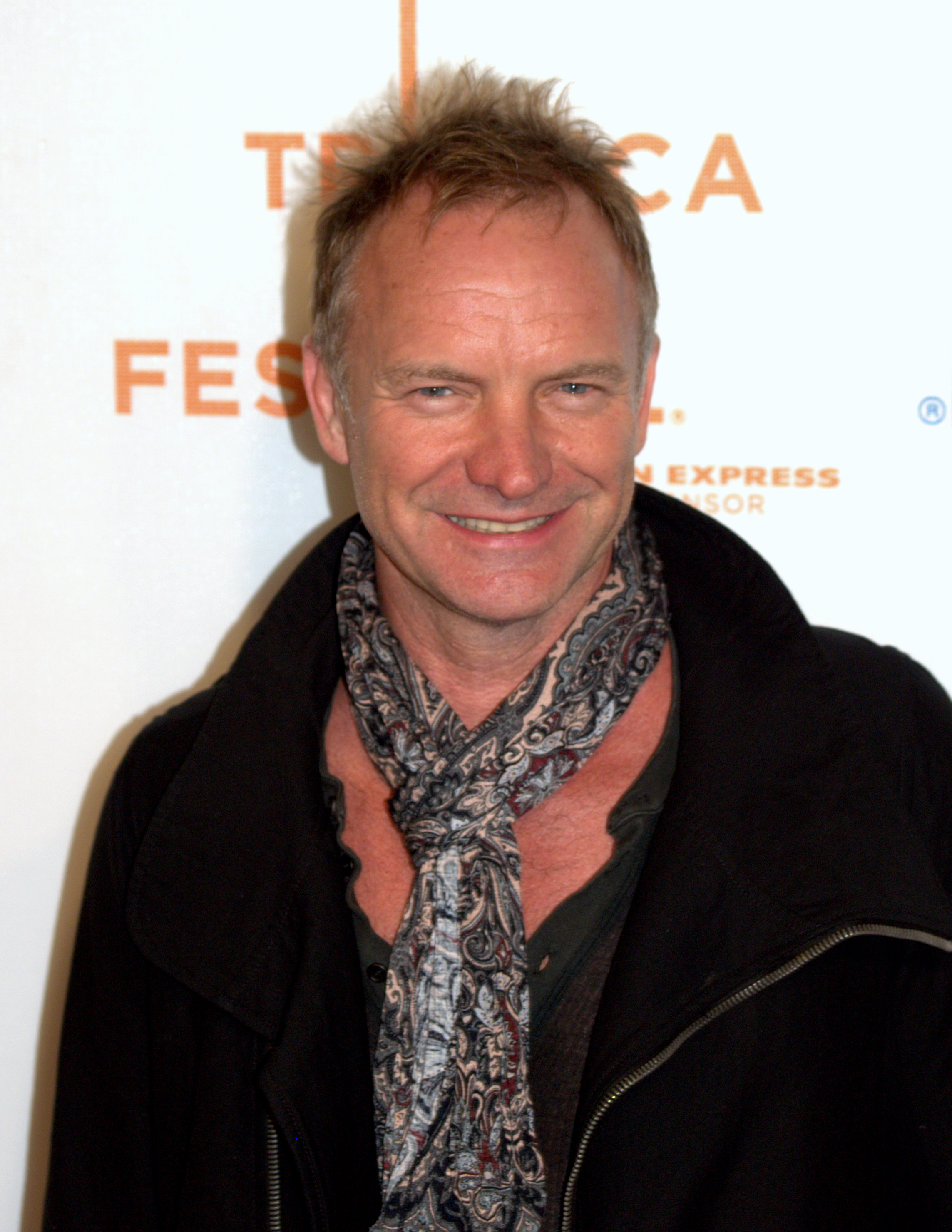
Sting has earned two accolades from this category for Bring On the Night and Ten Summoner's Tales.

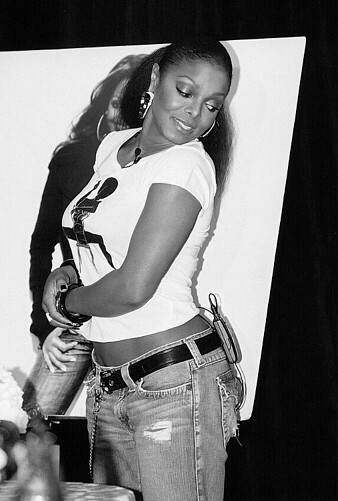
Janet Jackson won the award in 1990 for Rhythm Nation 1814.

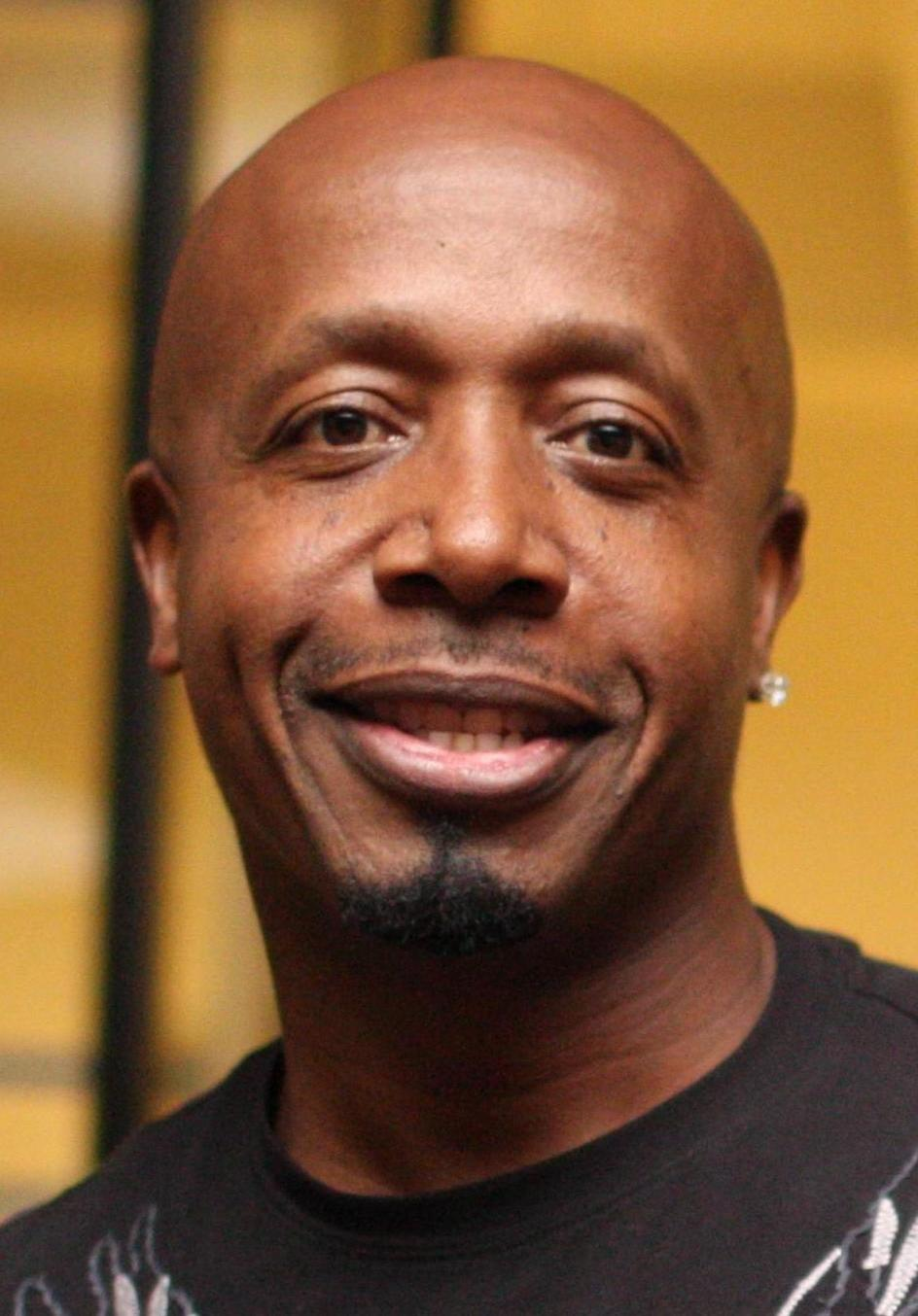
1991 recipient rapper MC Hammer won for Please Hammer, Don't Hurt 'Em

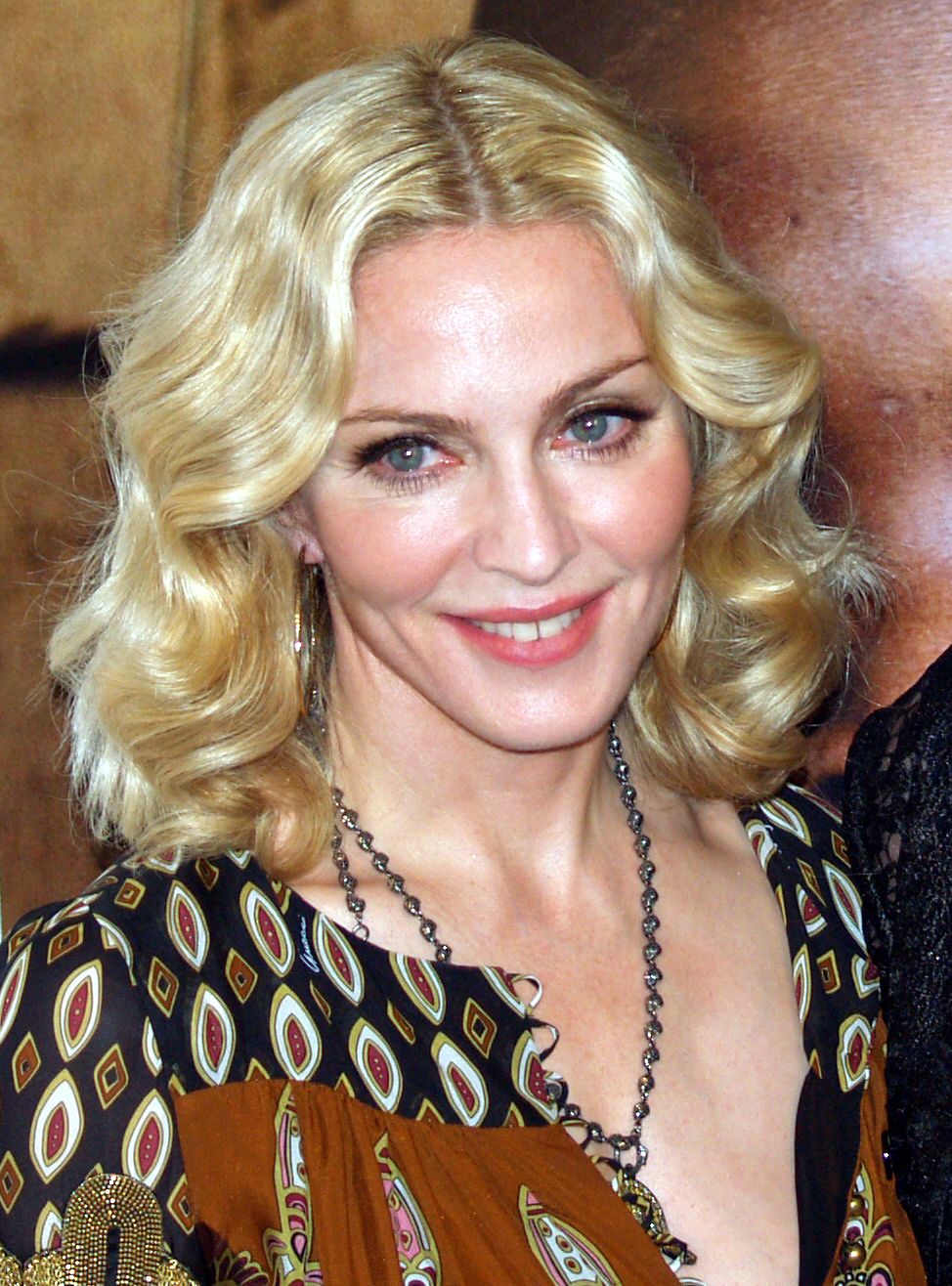
Two-time award winner Madonna. She won in 1992 for Madonna: Live! – Blond Ambition World Tour 90 and again in 2008 for The Confessions Tour: Live from London.

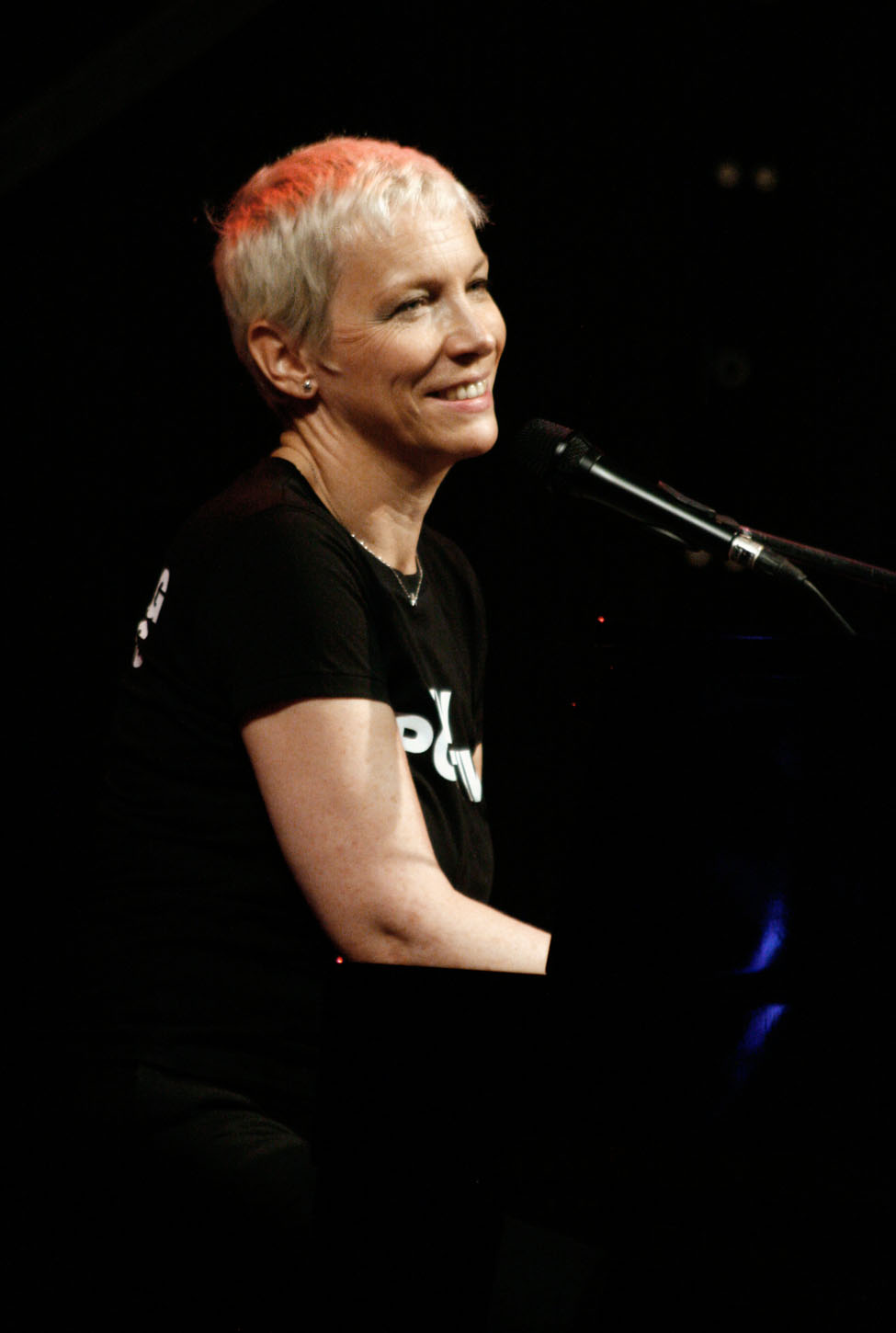
1993 winner, Annie Lennox.

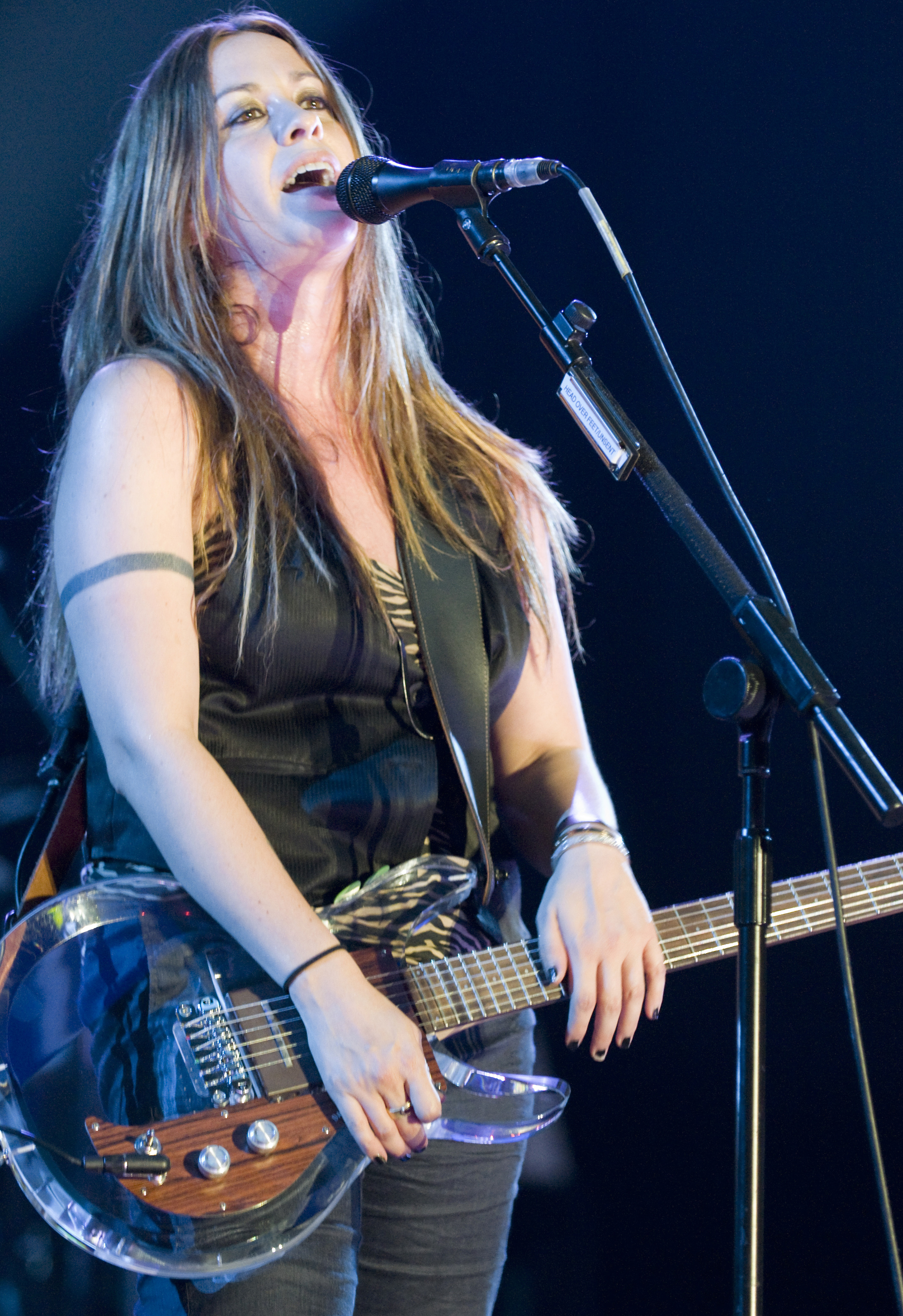
Alanis Morissette won the award in 1998 for Alanis Morissette: Jagged Little Pill, Live

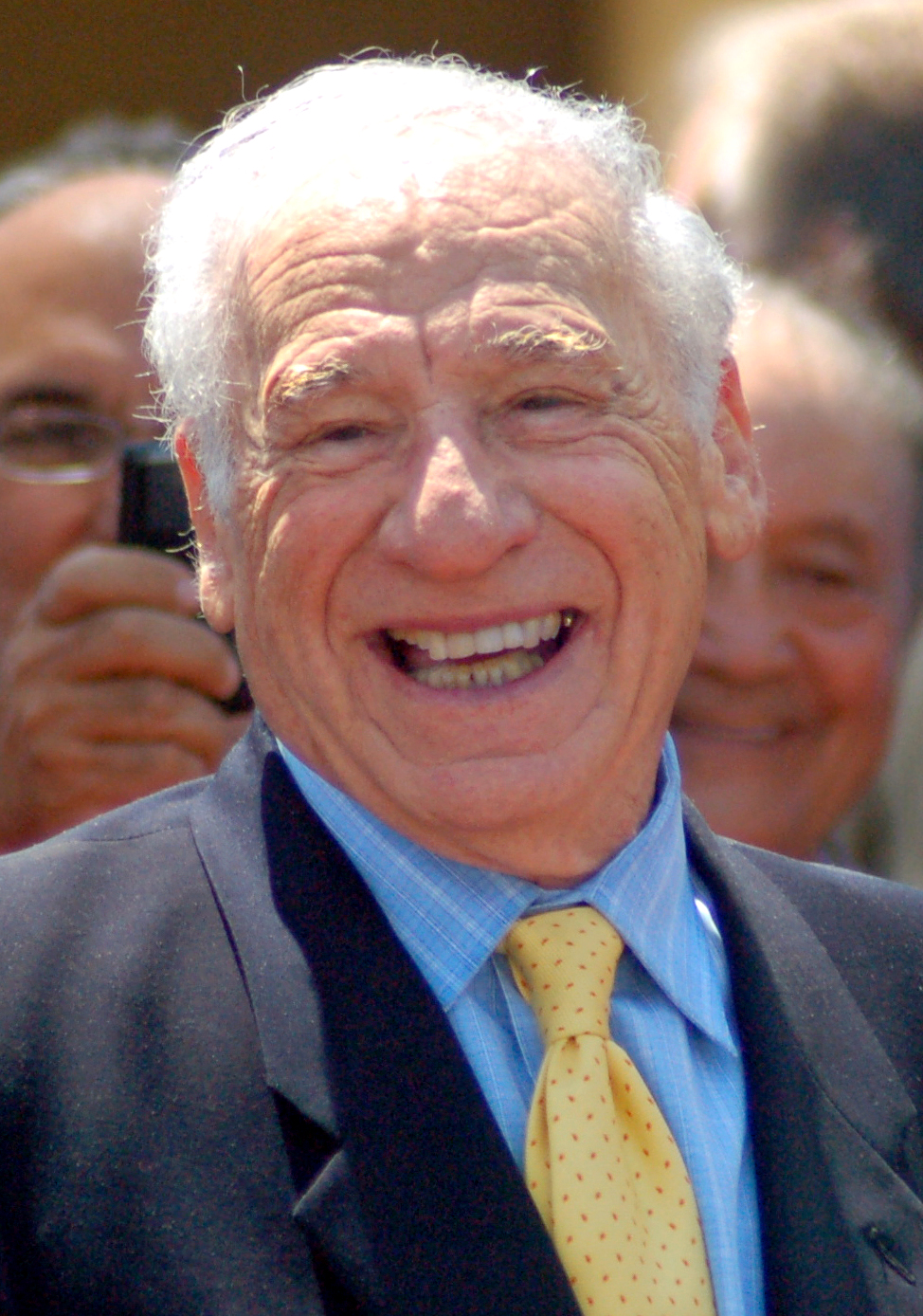
Mel Brooks won the award for Recording The Producers: A Musical Romp with Mel Brooks.

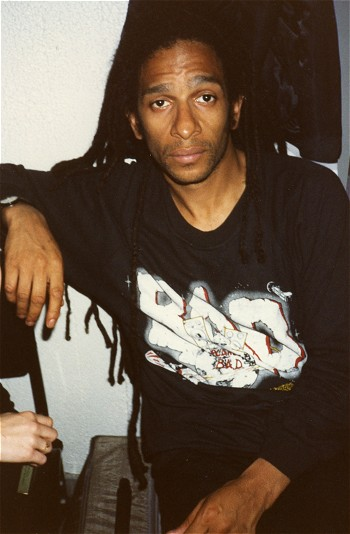
Director Don Letts received the award for the documentary Westway to the World about the band The Clash.

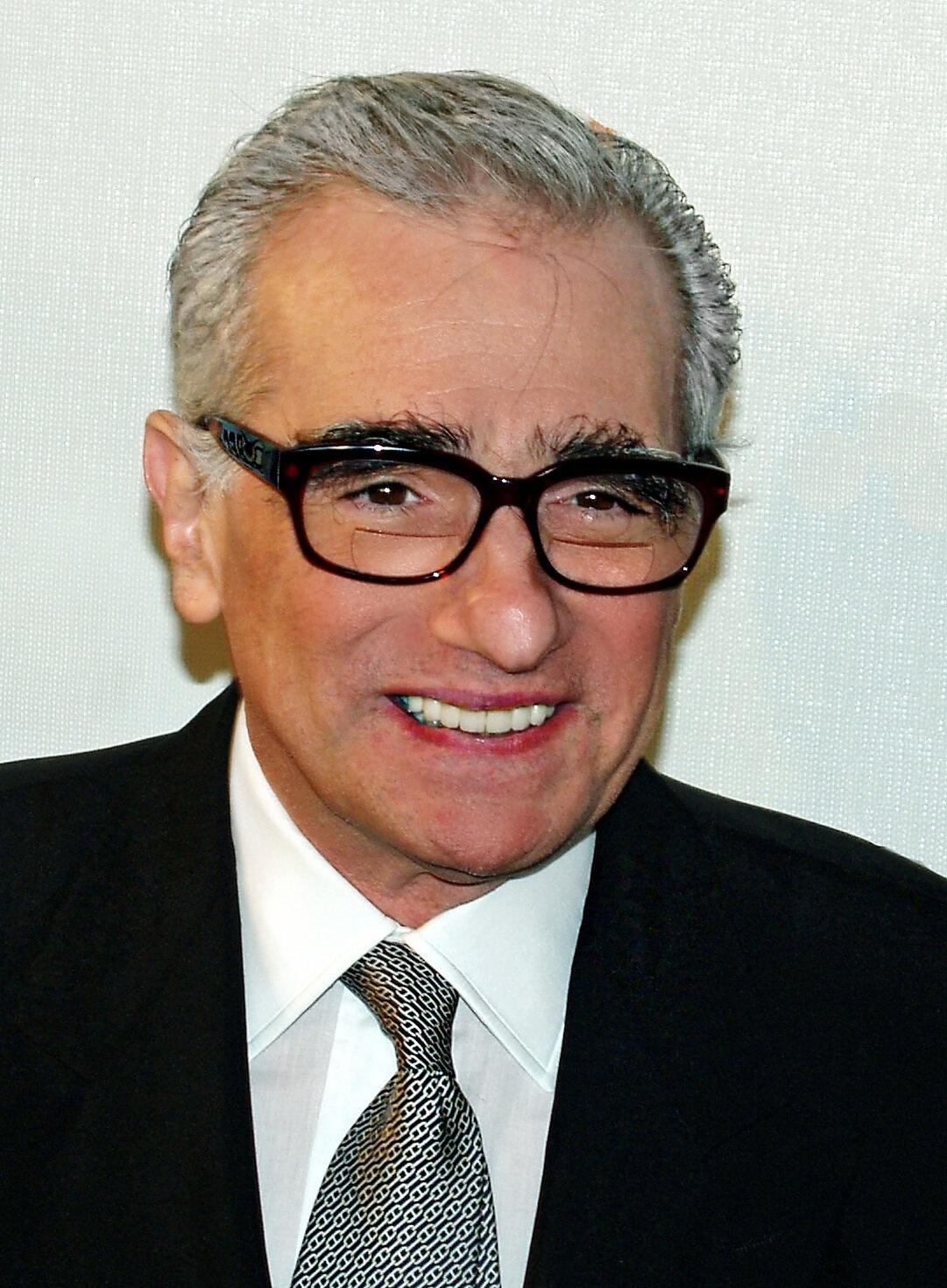
2006 award winner for directing the documentary No Direction Home, Martin Scorsese

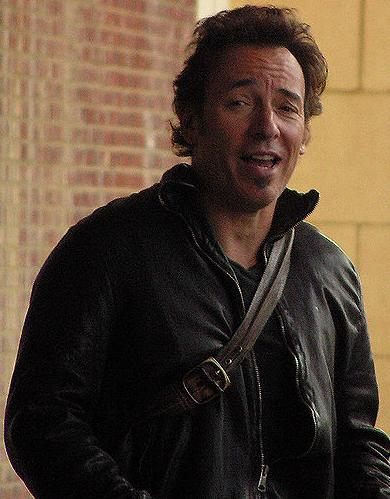
Bruce Springsteen won the accolade in 2007 for Wings for Wheels: The Making of Born to Run

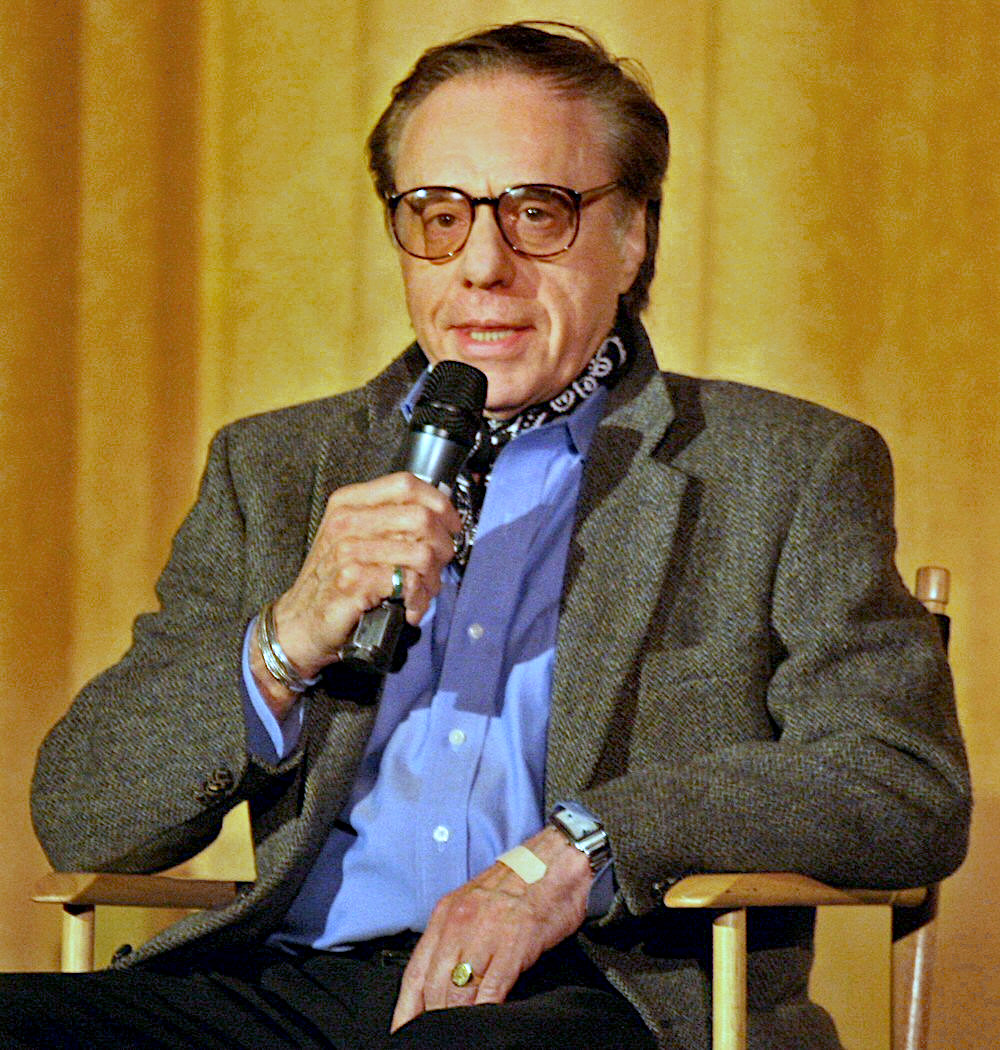
In 2009, Peter Bogdanovich earned the Grammy Award for Best Long Form Music Video for directing Runnin' Down a Dream

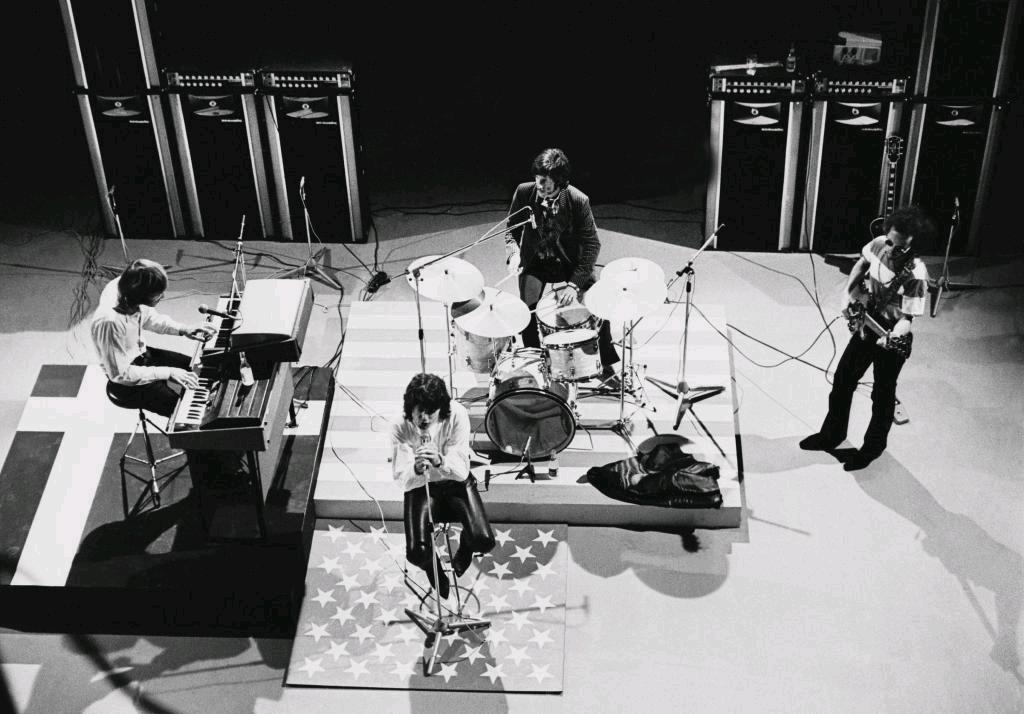
2011 award winners included director Tom DiCillo for When You're Strange: A Film About The Doors.

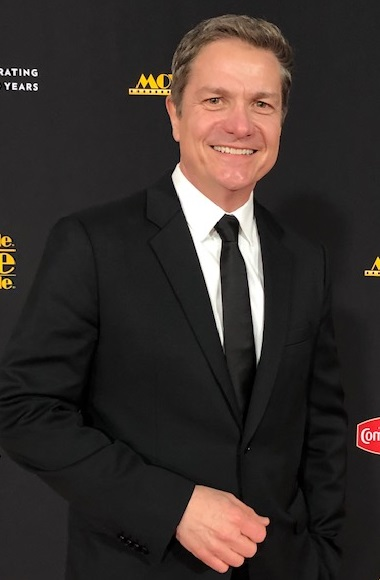
Director James Moll won Foo Fighters's Back and Forth.

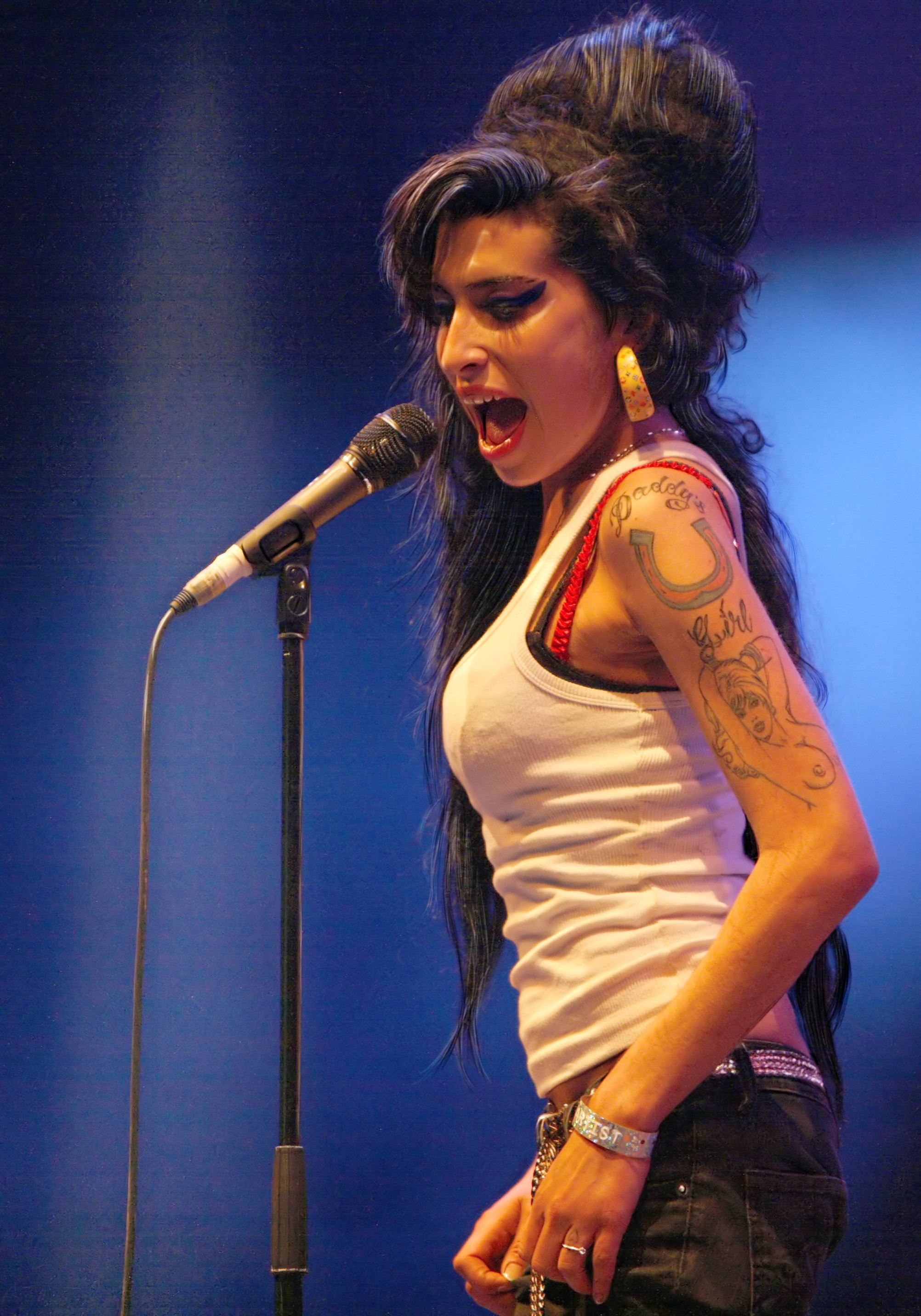
Amy Winehouse was the subject of 2016 winner Amy that depicted her life and death. The award went to the director Asif Kapadia who also won an Academy Award for Best Documentary Feature for the same film as well.

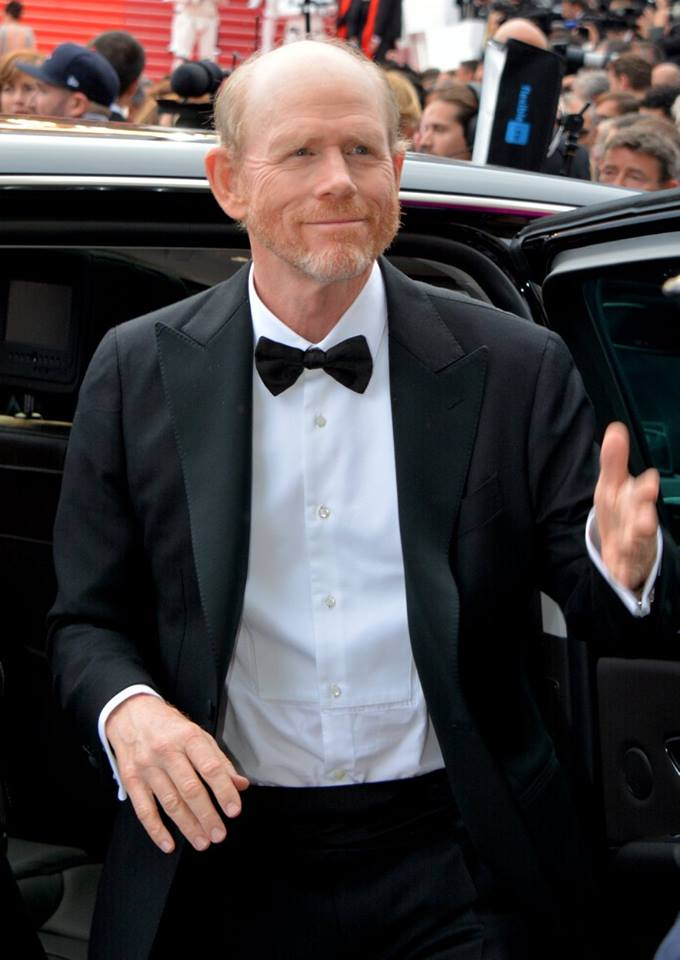
Oscar-winning director Ron Howard won for the documentary The Beatles: Eight Days a Week.

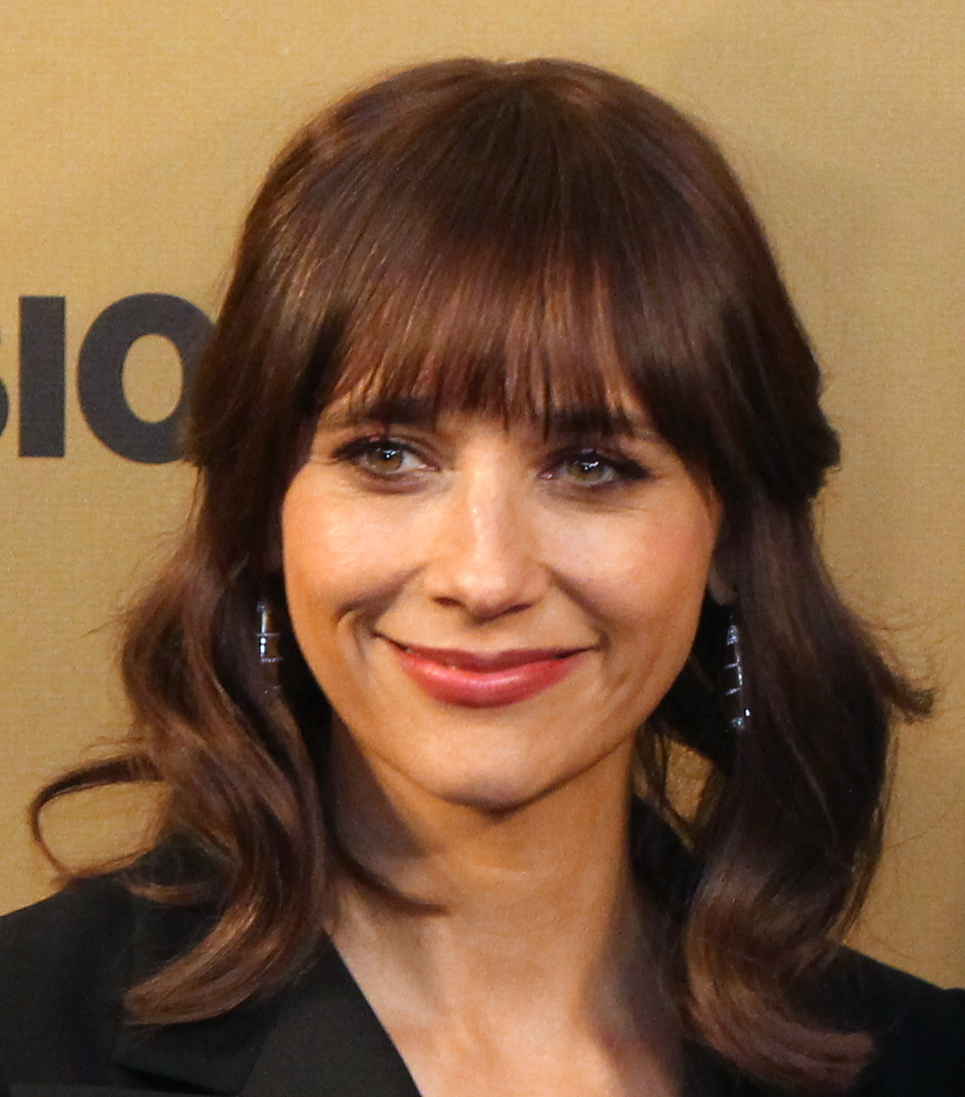
Rashida Jones won the award as co-director of Quincy, a film about her father, Quincy Jones.

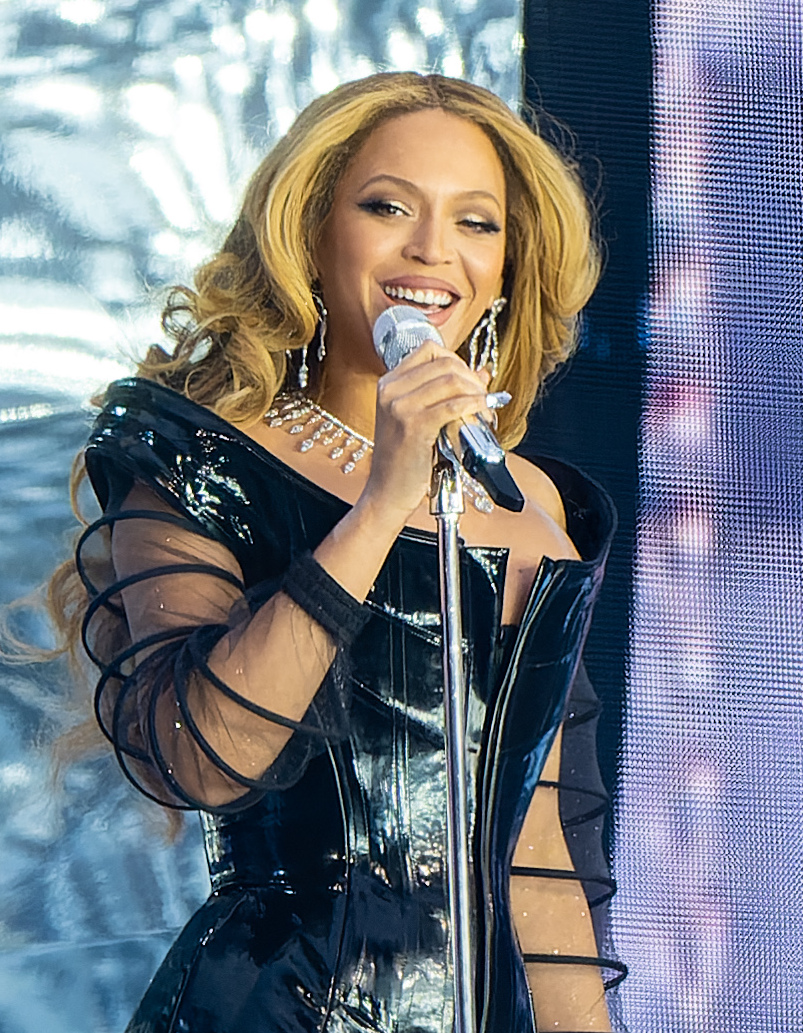
Beyoncé hold the record for the most nominations as of 2022 with five. She won the award in 2020 for directing and performing on Homecoming: A Film by Beyoncé.

=== 1980s ===
Year^{[I]}	Work	Artist(s)	Director(s) and Producer(s)^{[II]}
1984
1984	Duran Duran	Duran Duran	—N/a
1984	Alice Cooper: The Nightmare	Alice Cooper	—N/a
1984	Rolling Stones: Let's Spend the Night Together	The Rolling Stones	—N/a
1984	Olivia in Concert	Olivia Newton-John	—N/a
1984	Grace Jones: A One Man Show	Grace Jones	—N/a
1984	Word of Mouth	Toni Basil	—N/a
1985
1985	Making Michael Jackson's Thriller	Michael Jackson	—N/a
1985	Billy Joel Live from Long Island	Billy Joel	—N/a
1985	Heartbeat City	The Cars	—N/a
1985	Serious Moonlight	David Bowie	—N/a
1985	Eurythmics: Sweet Dreams (The Video Album)	Eurythmics	—N/a
1985	We're All Devo	Devo	—N/a
1986
1986	Huey Lewis and the News: The Heart of Rock 'n' Roll	Huey Lewis and the News	Bruce Gowers, director
1986	The Police Synchronicity Concert	The Police	Lol Creme and Kevin Godley, directors
1986	Prince and the Revolution: Live	Prince and the Revolution	Paul Becher, director
1986	Tina Live — Private Dancer Tour	Tina Turner	David Mallet, director
1986	Wham! The Video	Wham!	—N/a
1987
1987	Bring On the Night	Sting	Michael Apted, director; Sting, producer
1987	9012Live	Yes	Steven Soderbergh, director
1987	Frank Sinatra: Portrait of an Album	Frank Sinatra	Emil G. Davidson and Gary Weis, directors
1987	Pete Townsend: White City – The Music Movie	Pete Townsend	Richard Lowenstein, director
1987	Sun City	Artists United Against Apartheid	Lol Creme, Jonathan Demme, Kevin Godley and Hart Perry, directors; Arthur Baker and Little Steven, producers
1988
1988	—N/a	—N/a	—N/a
1989
1989	—N/a	—N/a	—N/a

=== 1990s ===
Year^{[I]}	Work	Artist(s)	Director(s) and Producer(s)^{[II]}
1990
1990	Rhythm Nation 1814	Janet Jackson	Jonathan Dayton, Valerie Faris and Dominic Sena, directors; Jonathan Dayton, Valerie Faris and Aris McGarry, producers
1990	In Concert: Delicate Sound of Thunder	Pink Floyd	Wayne Isham, director; Curt Marvis, producer
1990	Hangin' Tough	New Kids on the Block	Doug Nichol, director; Bryan Johnson, producer
1990	Moonwalker	Michael Jackson	Colin Chilvers and Jerry Kramer, director; Frank DiLeo, Michael Jackson, Dennis Jones and Jerry Kramer, producers
1990	Savage	Eurythmics	Sophie Muller, director; Billy Poveda and John Stewart, producers
1991
1991	Please Hammer, Don't Hurt 'Em: The Movie	MC Hammer	Rupert Wainwright, director; John Oetjen, producer
1991	Bernstein in Berlin — Beethoven: Symphony No. 9	Leonard Bernstein	Humphrey Burton, director
1991	Live — Featuring the Rock Opera Tommy	The Who	Larry Jordan, director; Michael Pillot, producer
1991	The Singles Collection	Phil Collins	Jim Yukich, director; Paul Flattery, producer
1991	We Too Are One	Eurythmics	Sophie Muller, director; Billy Poveda and John Stewart, producers
1992
1992	Madonna: Blonde Ambition World Tour Live	Madonna	David Mallet and Mark "Aldo" Miceli, directors; Anthony Eaton, producer
1992	Lifers Group World Tour Rahway Prison, That's It	Lifers Group	Penelope Spheeris, director; Jessica Cooper, producer
1992	Live at Yankee Stadium	Billy Joel	Jon Small, director; Jon Small, producer
1992	P.O.V.	Peter Gabriel	Michael Chapman and Hart Perry, directors; Dana Heinz and Sandy Lieberson, producers
1992	Year of the Horse	Sinéad O'Connor	Sophie Muller, director; Steve Fargnoli and James Todd, producers
1993
1993	Diva	Annie Lennox	Sophie Muller, director; Rob Small, producer
1993	Classic Visions 5: Gershwin, D'Albert, Strauss and Honegger	Swiss Radio Symphony; Matthias Bamert, conductor	Adrian Marthaler, director; Armin Brunner, producer
1993	The Enemy Strikes Live	Public Enemy	Larry Holland, director; J. Kevin Swain, producer
1993	Hammerin' Home	MC Hammer	Rupert Wainwright, director; Oliver Fuselier, Guy J. Louthan and Terance Power, producers
1993	Phallus in Wonderland	Gwar	Judas Bullhorn and Distortion Wells, directors; Dean English, producer
1994
1994	Ten Summoner's Tales	Sting	Doug Nichol, director; Julie Fong, producer
1994	Canadian Brass: Home Movies	Canadian Brass	Niv Fichman, director and producer
1994	A Celebration: A Musical Tribute to the Spirit of the Disabled American Veteran	Travis Tritt	Jack Cole, director; Len Epand and Ken Kragen, producers
1994	Miles and Quincy Live at Montreux	Miles Davis and Quincy Jones	Rudi Dolezal, Hannes Rossacher and Gavin Taylor, directors; Jim Beach and Louise Velazquez, producers
1994	Rocky World	Daniel Lanois	Phil King, director; Phil King, producer
1994	Three Phase	Tangerine Dream	Michael Boydstun, director
1995
1995	Zoo TV: Live from Sydney	U2	David Mallet, director; Ned O'Hanlon and Rocky Oldham, producer
1995	Devotional	Depeche Mode	Anton Corbijn, director; Richard Bell, producer
1995	A Prokofiev Fantasy with Peter and the Wolf	Claudio Abbado and Sting	Steve Bendelack, Roger Law and Christopher Swann, directors; Joanna Beresford and Frances Peters, producers
1995	Ravel: Bolero; Mussogsky: Pictures at an Exhibition	Charles Dutoit conducting Montreal Symphony Orchestra	Bernar Hebert, Adrian Marthaler and Barbara Willis Sweete, directors; Niv Fichman, producer
1995	The Girlie Show – Live Down Under	Madonna	Marty Callner and Mark "Aldo" Miceli, directors
1996
1996	Secret World Live	Peter Gabriel	François Girard, director; Robert Warr, producer
1996	333	Green Jellÿ	Green Jellÿ (Mike Bloomquist, David Cannizzaro, Joe Cannizzaro, Mike Davis, Anthony Gotta, Gary Hellsinger, Eugene Kelly, Bill Manspeaker, Rose Mattrey and Kim O'Donnell), directors
1996	The Line, the Cross & the Curve	Kate Bush	Kate Bush, director; Margarita Doyle, producer
1996	The Planets	Charles Dutoit conducting Montreal Symphony Orchestra	Barbara Willis Sweete, director; Niv Fichman, producer
1996	Saltimbanco	Cirque Du Soleil	Jacques Payette, director; Helene Dufresne, producer
1996	Where'd You Hide the Body	James McMurtry	K.C. Amos, Bill Brown, Ingrid Calame, Sande Chen, Gregory E. Connor, Linda Feferman, Johannes Gamble, Nathan Hope, Pip Johnson, Brenda McIntyre, Luis Ruiz and Deborah Stratman, directors
1997
1997	The Beatles Anthology	The Beatles	Bob Smeaton and Geoff Wonfor, directors; Chips Chipperfield and Neil Aspinall, producers
1997	Blood Brothers	Bruce Springsteen	Ernie Fritz, director; Ernie Fritz, Jack Gulick and Lee Rolontz, producers
1997	Farewell: Live from the Universal Amphitheatre	Oingo Boingo	Scott Palazzo, director; Laura Engel, producer
1997	Live from London	Bon Jovi	David Mallet, director; Andy Picheta, producer
1997	Satie and Suzanne	Reinbert de Leeuw	Tim Southam, director; Daniel Iron and Jennifer Jonas, producers
1998
1998	Jagged Little Pill — Live	Alanis Morissette	Alanis Morissette and Steve Purcell, directors; Alanis Morissette, David May, Glen Ballard and Steve Purcell, producers
1998	Blue Note: A Story of Modern Jazz	Various Artists	Julian Benedikt, director; Ulli Pfau, producer
1998	Forever's a Long, Long Time	Orquestra Was	Don Was, director; Larry Shapiro, producer
1998	Letters from a Porcupine	Blind Melon	Steve MacCorkle, director and producer
1998	Live in Amsterdam: Wildest Dreams Tour	Tina Turner	David Mallet, director; Monique Ten Berge, Harry De Winter and Patrick Roubroeks, producers
1999
1999	American Masters — Lou Reed: Rock & Roll Heart	Lou Reed	Timothy Greenfield-Sanders, director; Karen Bernstein, Susan Lacy, Tamar Hacker and Timothy Greenfield-Sanders, producers
1999	Inspired by Bach: Six Gestures – No. 6	Yo-Yo Ma	Patricia Rozema, director; Niv Fichman, producer
1999	Robert Altman's Jazz '34: Remembrances of Kansas City Swing	Various Artists (Harry Belafonte, narrator)	Robert Altman, director; Robert Altman, Brent Carpenter, James McLindon and Matthew Seig, producers
1999	TeleVoid	Scott Rockenfield and Paul Speer featuring Sir Mix-a-Lot	Michael Boydstun, director and producer
1999	They Wanted the Highway	Fastball	Ondi Timoner, director; Mark Didia, David Timoner and Ondi Timoner, producers

=== 2000s ===
Year^{[I]}	Work	Artist(s)	Director(s) and Producer(s)^{[II]}
2000
2000	Band of Gypsys: Live at Fillmore East	Jimi Hendrix^{IV}	Bob Smeaton, director; Chips Chipperfield and Neil Aspinall, producers
2000	The Making of 'Ride With Bob'	Asleep at the Wheel	Dan Karlok, director/producer
2000	Don't Stop	Gloria Estefan	Mo Fitzgibbon, director; Mo Fitzgibbon and Robert Walker, producers
2000	Meeting People Is Easy	Radiohead	Grant Gee, director; Dilly Gent, producer
2000	PopMart: Live from Mexico City	U2	David Mallet, director; Ned O'Hanlon, producer
2001
2001	Gimme Some Truth: The Making of John Lennon's Imagine Album	John Lennon^{IV}	Andrew Solt, director; Andrew Solt, Greg Vines, Leslie Tong and Yoko Ono, producers
2001	American Masters — Ella Fitzgerald: Something to Live For	Ella Fitzgerald	Charlotte Zwerin, director; Karen Bernstein, Tamar Hacker and Susan Lacy, producers
2001	The Art of Piano: Great Pianists of the 20th Century	Various Artists^{IV}	Donald Sturrock, director; Pierre-Olivier Bardet and Stephen Wright, producers
2001	Endless Harmony — The Beach Boys Story, A Documentary	The Beach Boys	Alan Boyd, director; Stephanie Bennett, producer
2001	Teatro	Willie Nelson	Wim Wenders, director; Deepak Nayar, producer
2002
2002	Recording The Producers: A Musical Romp with Mel Brooks	Mel Brooks	Susan Froemke, director; Peter Gelb and Susan Froemke, producers
2002	Freddie Mercury: The Untold Story	Freddie Mercury^{IV}	Rudi Dolezal and Hannes Rossacher, directors; Jim Beach and Rudi Dolezal, producers
2002	Play: The DVD	Moby	Moby, director; Moby and Jeff Rogers, producers
2002	Rebel Music: The Bob Marley Story	Bob Marley^{IV}	Jeremy Marre, director/producer
2003
2003	Westway to the World	The Clash	Don Letts, director
2003	1 Giant Leap	1 Giant Leap	Duncan Bridgeman and Jamie Catto, directors/producers
2003	Live at the Albert	Robbie Williams	Hamish Hamilton, director; Lee Lodge, producer
2003	Welcome to the Club: The Women of Rockabilly	Various Artists^{IV}	Beth Harrington, director/producer
2003	The World According to Nappy	Nappy Roots	Gloria Gabriel, director; David Anthony, Gloria Gabriel and James Lopez, producers
2004
2004	Legend	Sam Cooke^{IV}	Mary Wharton, Mick Gochanour and Robin Klein, producers
2004	The American Folk Blues Festival 1962-1966, Volume 1	Various Artists^{IV}	Janie L. Hendrix, Jon Kanis, John McDermott and David Peck, producers
2004	American Masters — Muddy Waters: Can't Be Satisfied	Muddy Waters^{IV}	Robert Gordon and Morgan Neville, directors/producers
2004	Leonard Bernstein: Trouble in Tahiti	Various Artists^{IV}	Tom Cairns, director; Fiona Morris, producer
2004	Phase One: Celebrity Take Down	Gorillaz	Jamie Hewlett, director; Tom Girling, producer
2005
2005	Concert for George	Various Artists^{IV}	David Leland, director; Jon Kamen, Olivia Harrison, and Ray Cooper, producers
2005	John Adams: The Death of Klinghoffer	John Adams and London Symphony Orchestra	Penny Woolcock, director; Madonna Baptiste, producer
2005	Coldplay Live 2003	Coldplay	John Durrant and Russell Thomas, directors; Sarah Layish-Melamed, Lee Lodge and Melanie Vaughton, producers
2005	Martin Scorsese Presents: The Blues – A Music Journey	Various Artists^{IV}	Margaret Bodde, Michael Borofsky, Alex Gibney, Richard Hutton, Jeffrey Peisch and Martin Scorsese, producers
2005	Tom Dowd and the Language of Music	Various Artists^{IV}	Mark Moormann, director; Scott L. Gordon, Mark Hunt and Mark Moormann, producers
2006
2006	No Direction Home	Bob Dylan^{IV}	Martin Scorsese, director; Anthony Wall, Jeff Rosen, Margaret Bodde, Martin Scorsese, Nigel Sinclair and Susan Lacy, producers
2006	Brian Wilson Presents Smile	Brian Wilson	John Anderson and David Leaf, directors; Dave Goetz, David Leaf, Steve Ligerman, Maggie Magee, John Scheinfeld, Casey Sipes, Richard Waltzer and Brian Wilson, producers
2006	Devils & Dust	Bruce Springsteen	Danny Clinch, director; Lindha Narvaez, producer
2006	End of the Century: The Story of the Ramones	Ramones	Jim Fields and Michael Gramaglia, directors/producers
2006	Trapped in the Closet (Chapters 1–5)	R. Kelly	R. Kelly and Jim Swaffield, directors; Ann Carli, producer
2007
2007	Wings for Wheels: The Making of Born to Run	Bruce Springsteen	Thom Zimny, director/producer
2007	Demon Days: Live in Manchester	Gorillaz	Damon Albarn, David Barnard, Grant Gee and Jamie Hewlett, directors; Kersti Bergstrom, Stefan Demetriou, Simon Jones and Claire Oxley, producers
2007	Directions	Death Cab for Cutie	Noah Gelb, Nicholas Harmer, Jill Kaplan and Aaron Stewart-Ahn, producers
2007	Flow: Living in the Stream of Music	Terence Blanchard	Jim Gabour, director; Robin Burgess and Jim Gabour, producers
2007	I'm Going to Tell You a Secret	Madonna	Jonas Akerlund, director; Susan Applegate, Angela Becker, Keeley Gould, Shelli Jury and David May, producers
2008
2008	The Confessions Tour	Madonna	Jonas Åkerlund, director; David May and Sara Martin, producers
2008	10 Days Out: Blues from the Backroads	Kenny Wayne Shepherd	Noble Jones, director; Phillipa Davis, Kelly Norris Sarno and Kenny Wayne Shepherd, producers
2008	Liberacion: The Songs of the New Cuban Underground	Various Artists^{IV}	Reuben Fields, director; Dean Bates and CM Murphy, producers
2008	Live & Loud at the Fillmore	Dierks Bentley	Russell Thomas, director; James Whetherly, producer
2008	Trapped in the Closet (Chapters 13–22)	R. Kelly	R. Kelly, Victor Mignatti and Jim Swaffield, directors; Ann Carli, producer
2009
2009	Runnin' Down a Dream	Tom Petty and the Heartbreakers	Peter Bogdanovich, director; Skot Bright, Tony Dimitriades and George Drakoulias, producers
2009	Amazing Journey: The Story of The Who	The Who	Paul Crowder and Murray Lerner, directors; Robert Rosenberg and Nigel Sinclair, producers
2009	Good Girl Gone Bad Live	Rihanna	Paul Caslin, director; John Paveley, Ruth Paveley and Rupert Style, producers
2009	Respect Yourself: The Stax Records Story	Various Artists^{IV}	Robert Gordon and Morgan Neville, directors; Mark Crosby, Robert Gordon and Morgan Neville, producers
2009	Where the Light Is: Live in Los Angeles	John Mayer	Danny Clinch, director; Lindha Narvaez, producer

=== 2010s ===
Year^{[I]}	Work	Artist(s)	Director(s) and Producer(s)^{[II]}
2010
2010	The Beatles Love – All Together Now	The Beatles and Cirque du Soleil^{IV}	Adrian Wills, director; Jonathan Clyde and Martin Bolduc, producers
2010	Anita O'Day: The Life of a Jazz Singer	Anita O'Day	Robbie Cavolina and Ian McCrudden, directors; Robbie Cavolina, Melissa Davis and Ian McCrudden, producers
2010	In Boston	Chris Botti	Jim Gable, director; Bobby Colomby, producer
2010	Johnny Cash's America	Johnny Cash^{IV}	Robert Gordon and Morgan Neville, directors/producers
2010	Love, Pain & the Whole Crazy World Tour Live	Keith Urban	Chris Hicky, director; Blake Morrison, producer
2011
2011	When You're Strange	The Doors^{IV}	Tom DiCillo, director; Dick Wolf, Jeff Jampol, John Beug, and Peter Jankowski, producers
2011	The Greatest Ears in Town: The Arif Mardin Story	Arif Mardin^{IV}	Douglas Biro and Joe Mardin, directors/producers
2011	No Distance Left to Run	Blur	Will Lovelace, Dylan Southern and Giorgio Testi, directors; Thomas Benski, Laura Collins, Stefan Demetriou, Terry Felgate, Steve Heaver, Chris Morris and Lucas Ochoa, producers
2011	Rush: Beyond the Lighted Stage	Rush	Sam Dunn and Scot McFadyen, directors/producers
2011	Under Great White Northern Lights	The White Stripes	Emmett Malloy, director; Ian Montone and Mike Sarkissian, producers
2012
2012	Foo Fighters: Back and Forth	Foo Fighters	James Moll, director; James Moll and Nigel Sinclair, producers
2012	Beats, Rhymes & Life: The Travels of A Tribe Called Quest	A Tribe Called Quest	Michael Rapaport, director; Kamaal Fareed, Ali Shaheed Muhammad, Malik Taylor and Jarobi White, Robert Benavides, Debra Koffler, Eric Matthies, Frank Mele and Edward Parks, producers
2012	I Am... World Tour	Beyoncé	Ed Burke, Frank Gatson Jr. and Beyoncé Knowles, directors; Beyoncé Knowles and Camille Yorrick, producers
2012	Nine Types of Light	TV on the Radio	Tunde Adebimpe, director; Michelle An and Caren Braj, producers
2012	Talihina Sky: The Story of Kings of Leon	Kings of Leon	Stephen C. Mitchell, director; Casey McGrath, producer
2013
2013	Big Easy Express	Mumford & Sons, Edward Sharpe and the Magnetic Zeros and Old Crow Medicine Show	Emmett Malloy, director; Bryan Ling, Mike Luba and Tim Lynch, producers
2013	Bring Me Home – Live 2011	Sade	Sophie Muller, director; Roger Davies, Grant Jue and Sophie Muller, producers
2013	From the Sky Down	U2	Davis Guggenheim, director; Belisa Balaban, Brian Celler, Davis Guggenheim and Ted Skillman, producers
2013	Get Along	Tegan & Sara	Danny O'Malley, Salazar (Nathan Drilliot, Jeff Petry, Sara Quin, Tegan Quin and Jesse Savath) and Elinor Svoboda, directors; Nick Blasko, Piers Henwood, Sara Quin and Tegan Quin, producers
2013	Radio Music Society	Esperanza Spalding	Pilar Sanz, director; Esperanza Spalding, producer
2014
2014	Live Kisses	Paul McCartney	Jonas Åkerlund, director; Violaine Etienne, Aron Levine and Scott Rodger, producers
2014	¡Cuatro!	Green Day	Tim Wheeler, director; Tim Lynch, producer
2014	I'm In I'm Out and I'm Gone: The Making of Get Up!	Ben Harper and Charlie Musselwhite	Danny Clinch, director; Ben Harper, producer
2014	Live 2012	Coldplay	Paul Dugdale, director; Jim Parsons, producer
2014	The Road to Red Rocks	Mumford & Sons	Nicolas Jack Davies and Frederick Scott, directors; Dan Bowen, producer
2015
2015	20 Feet from Stardom	Darlene Love, Merry Clayton, Lisa Fischer and Judith Hill	Morgan Neville, director; Gil Friesen and Caitrin Rogers, producers
2015	Beyoncé and Jay-Z: On the Run Tour	Beyoncé and Jay-Z	Jonas Åkerlund, director; Ed Burke, Svana Gisla and Dan Parise, producers
2015	Ghost Stories	Coldplay	Paul Dugdale, director; Jim Parsons, producer
2015	Metallica: Through the Never	Metallica	Nimród Antal, director; Adam Ellison and Charlotte Huggins, producers
2015	The Truth About Love Tour: Live from Melbourne	Pink	Larn Poland, director; Roger Davies, producer
2016
2016	Amy	Amy Winehouse^{IV}	Asif Kapadia, director; James Gay-Rees, producer
2016	Mr. Dynamite: The Rise of James Brown	James Brown^{IV}	Alex Gibney, director; Peter Afterman, Blair Foster, Mick Jagger and Victoria Pearman, producers
2016	Sonic Highways	Foo Fighters	Dave Grohl, director; John Cutcliffe, Dave Grohl, John Ramsay, James A. Rota, John Silva, Gaby Skolnek and Kristen Welsh, producers
2016	The Wall	Roger Waters	Sean Evans and Roger Waters, directors; Clare Spencer and Roger Waters, producers
2016	What Happened, Miss Simone?	Nina Simone^{IV}	Liz Garbus, director; Liz Garbus, Amy Hobby, Jayson Jackson and Justin Wilkes, producers
2017
2017	The Beatles: Eight Days a Week – The Touring Years	The Beatles^{IV}	Ron Howard, director; Brian Grazer, Ron Howard, Scott Pascucci and Nigel Sinclair, producers
2017	American Saturday Night: Live from the Grand Ole Opry	Various Artists^{IV}	George J. Flanigen IV, director; Steve Buchanan, John Burke, Lindsey Clark, Robert Deaton, Pete Fisher and George J. Flanigen IV, producers
2017	I'll Sleep When I'm Dead	Steve Aoki	Justin Krook, director; Brent Almond, Matt Colon, David Gelb, Ryan Kavanaugh, Michael Theanne, Happy Walters and Matthew Weaver, producers
2017	Lemonade	Beyoncé	Beyoncé Knowles Carter and Kahlil Joseph, directors; Ed Burke, Beyoncé Knowles Carter, Steve Pamon, Todd Tourso, Dora Melissa Vargas and Erinn Williams, producers
2017	The Music of Strangers	Yo-Yo Ma and The Silk Road Ensemble	Morgan Neville, director; Caitrin Rogers, producer
2018
2018	The Defiant Ones	Various Artists^{IV}	Allen Hughes, director; Sarah Anthony, Fritzi Horstman, Broderick Johnson, Gene Kirkwood, Andrew Kosove, Laura Lancaster, Michael Lombardo, Jerry Longarzo, Doug Pray and Steven Williams, producers
2018	Long Strange Trip	Grateful Dead	Amir Bar-Lev, director; Alex Blavatnik, Ken Dornstein, Eric Eisner, Nick Koskoff and Justin Kreutzmann, producers
2018	One More Time with Feeling	Nick Cave and the Bad Seeds	Andrew Dominik, director; Dulcie Kellett and James Wilson, producers
2018	Soundbreaking	Various Artists^{IV}	Maro Chermayeff and Jeff Dupre, directors; Joshua Bennett, Julia Marchesi, Sam Pollard, Sally Rosenthal, Amy Schewel and Warren Zanes, producers
2018	Two Trains Runnin'	Various Artists^{IV}	Sam Pollard, director; Benjamin Hedin, producer
2019
2019	Quincy	Quincy Jones	Alan Hicks and Rashida Jones, directors; Paula DuPré Pesmen, producer
2019	Itzhak	Itzhak Perlman	Alison Chernick, director/producer
2019	The King	Elvis Presley^{IV}	Eugene Jarecki, director; Christopher Frierson, Georgina Hill, David Kuhn and Christopher St. John, producers
2019	Life in 12 Bars	Eric Clapton	Lili Fini Zanuck, director; John Battsek, Scooter Weintraub, Larry Yelen and Lili Fini Zanuck, producers
2019	Whitney	Whitney Houston^{IV}	Kevin Macdonald, director; Jonathan Chinn, Simon Chinn and Lisa Erspamer, producers

=== 2020s ===
Year^{[I]}	Work	Artist(s)	Director(s) and Producer(s)^{[II]}
2020
2020	Homecoming: A Film by Beyoncé	Beyoncé	Beyoncé Knowles-Carter and Ed Burke, directors; Steve Pamon and Erinn Williams, producers
2020	Anima	Thom Yorke	Paul Thomas Anderson, director; Paul Thomas Anderson, Erica Frauman and Sara Murphy, producers
2020	Birth of the Cool	Miles Davis^{IV}	Stanley Nelson, director; Nicole London, producer
2020	Remember My Name	David Crosby	A.J. Eaton, director; Cameron Crowe, Michele Farinola and Greg Mariotti, producers
2020	Shangri-La	Various Artists^{IV}	Jeff Malmberg and Morgan Neville, directors; Danny Breen, producer
2021
2021	The Sound of My Voice	Linda Ronstadt	Rob Epstein and Jeffrey Friedman, directors; Michele Farinola and James Keach, producers
2021	Beastie Boys Story	Beastie Boys	Spike Jonze, director; Amanda Adelson, Jason Baurn and Spike Jonze, producers
2021	Black Is King	Beyoncé	Emmanuel Adjei, Blitz Bazawule, Beyoncé and Kwasi Fordjour, directors; Lauren Baker, Akin Omotoso, Nathan Scherrer, Jeremy Sullivan and Erinn Williams, producers
2021	That Little Ol' Band from Texas	ZZ Top	Sam Dunn, director; Scot McFadyen, producer
2021	We Are Freestyle Love Supreme	Freestyle Love Supreme	Andrew Fried, director; Andrew Fried, Jill Furman, Thomas Kail, Lin-Manuel Miranda, Sarina Roma, Jenny Steingart and Jon Steingart, producers
2022
2022	Summer of Soul	Various Artists^{IV}	Ahmir "Questlove" Thompson, director; David Dinerstein, Robert Fyvolent, and Joseph Patel, producers
2022	David Byrne's American Utopia	David Byrne	Spike Lee, director; David Byrne and Spike Lee, producers
2022	Happier Than Ever: A Love Letter to Los Angeles	Billie Eilish	Patrick Osborne and Robert Rodriguez, directors; Michelle An, Chelsea Dodson, Justin Lubliner and Juliet Tierney, producers
2022	Inside	Bo Burnham	Bo Burnham, director; Josh Senior, producer
2022	Music, Money, Madness... Jimi Hendrix in Maui	Jimi Hendrix^{IV}	John McDermott, director; Janie Hendrix, John McDermott and George Scott, producers
2023
2023	Jazz Fest: A New Orleans Story	Various Artists^{IV}	Frank Marshall and Ryan Suffern, directors; Frank Marshall, Sean Stuart and Ryan Suffern, producers
2023	Adele One Night Only	Adele	Paul Dugdale, director; Raj Kapoor and Ben Winston, producers
2023	Barn: A Band, A Brotherhood, A Barn	Neil Young and Crazy Horse	Daryl Hannah, director; Gary Ward, producer
2023	Billie Eilish: Live at the O2	Billie Eilish	Sam Wrench, director; Michelle An, Tom Colbourne, Chelsea Dodson and Billie Eilish, producers
2023	Motomami (Rosalía Tiktok Live Performance)	Rosalía	Ferrán Echegaray, Rosalía Vila Tobella and Stillz, directors; Karen Saurí Marchán and Christy Alcaraz Moyer, producers
2023	Our World	Justin Bieber	Michael D. Ratner, director; Michael D. Ratner, Kfir Goldberg, Andy Mininger and Scott Ratner, producers
2024
2024	Moonage Daydream	David Bowie^{IV}	Brett Morgen, director/producer
2024	Dear Mama	Tupac Shakur^{IV}	Allen Hughes, director; Joshua Garcia, Loren Gomez, James Jenkins and Stef Smith, producers
2024	How I'm Feeling Now	Lewis Capaldi	Joe Pearlman, director; Sam Bridger, Isabel Davis and Alice Rhodes, producers
2024	I Am Everything	Little Richard^{IV}	Lisa Cortés, director; Caryn Capotosto, Lisa Cortés, Robert Friedman and Liz Yale Marsh, producers
2024	Live from Paris: The Big Steppers Tour	Kendrick Lamar	Mike Carson, Dave Free and Mark Ritchie, directors; Cornell Brown, Debra Davis, Jared Heinke and Jamie Rabineau, producers
2025
2025	American Symphony	Jon Batiste	Matthew Heineman, director; Matthew Heineman, Lauren Domino and Jordan Okun, producers
2025	The Greatest Night in Pop	Various Artists^{IV}	Bao Nguyen, director; Bruce Eskowitz, George Hencken, Larry Klein, Julia Nottingham and Lionel Richie, producers
2025	June	June Carter Cash^{IV}	Kristen Vaurio, director; Josh Matas, Sarah Olson, Jason Owen, Mary Robertson and Kristen Vaurio, producers
2025	Kings from Queens	Run DMC	Kirk Fraser, director; William H. Masterson III, producer
2025	Stevie Van Zandt: Disciple	Steven van Zandt	Bill Teck, director; Robert Cotto, David Fisher and Bill Teck, producers
2026
2026	Music by John Williams	John Williams	Laurent Bouzereau, director; Sara Bernstein, Laurent Bouzereau, Justin Falvey, Darryl Frank, Brian Grazer, Ron Howard, Meredith Kaulfers, Kathleen Kennedy, Frank Marshall, Steven Spielberg and Justin Wilkes, producers
2026	Devo	Devo	Chris Smith, director; Danny Gabai, Anita Greenspan, Chris Holmes and Chris Smith, producers
2026	Live at the Royal Albert Hall	Raye	Paul Dugdale, director; Stefan Demetriou and Amy James, producers
2026	Piece by Piece	Pharrell Williams	Morgan Neville, director; Morgan Neville, Caitrin Rogers, Mimi Valdes and Pharrell Williams, producers
2026	Relentless	Diane Warren	Bess Kargman, director; Peggy Drexler, Michele Farinola, Bess Kargman and Kat Nguyen, producers
2027	EPiC: Elvis Presley in Concert	Elvis Presley	Baz Luhrmann, director; Jeremy Castro, Matthew Gross, Baz Luhrmann, Colin Smeeton & Schuyler Weiss, producers
2027	Hit Me Hard and Soft: The Tour Live	Billie Eilish	James Cameron & Billie Eilish, directors; Michelle An, Maggie Baird, Steve Berman, John Brooks, Geoff Burdick, James Cameron, Paul Clarke, Chelsea Dodson, Billie Eilish, John Janick, Justin Lubliner, Jason Owen & Maria Wilhelm, producers
2027	Lilith Fair: Building a Mystery — The Untold Story	Various Artists	Ally Pankiw, director; Dan Levy & Christina Piovesan, producers
2027	Man on the Run	Paul McCartney	Morgan Neville, director; Michelle Anthony, David Blackman, Ben Chappell, Morgan Neville, Scott Rodger, Chloe Simmons & Meghan Walsh, producers
2027	To Be Celestial vs. That's the Weight of the World	Earth, Wind & Fire	Ahmir "Questlove" Thompson, director; Samantha Grogen, Ahmir "Questlove" Thompson, Arron Saxe, Dave Sirulnick & K.B. White, producers

^{^[I]} Each year is linked to the article about the Grammy Awards held that year.
^{^[II]} Director(s) are only indicated if they were presented a Grammy Award.
^{^[III]} Award was not presented. Music video categories presented that year included Best Concept Music Video and Best Performance Music Video.
^{^[IV]} Award or nomination not presented to the performing artist (only to video director(s) and video producer(s))
^{^[V]}Award presented to video producers only

== Artists, directors, and producers with multiple wins ==
2 wins

- Jonas Akerlund
- Neil Aspinall
- Chips Chipperfield
- Brian Grazer
- Ron Howard
- Susan Lacy
- Madonna
- David Mallet
- Frank Marshall
- Nigel Sinclair
- Bob Smeaton
- Sting

== Artists, directors, and producers with multiple nominations ==
7 nominations

- Morgan Neville

6 nominations

- David Mallet

5 nominations

- Beyoncé
- Sophie Muller

4 nominations

- Jonas Akerlund
- Ed Burke
- Paul Dugdale
- Niv Fichman
- Madonna
- Nigel Sinclair

3 nominations

- Michelle An
- Danny Clinch
- Coldplay
- Stefan Demetriou
- Eurythmics
- Michele Farinola
- Robert Gordon
- Susan Lacy
- Caitrin Rogers
- Bruce Springsteen
- Sting
- U2
- Erinn Williams
- Billie Eilish

2 nominations

- Neil Aspinall
- Jim Beach
- Karen Bernstein
- Margaret Bodde
- Michael Boydstun
- Chips Chipperfield
- Cirque du Soleil
- Lol Creme
- Roger Davies
- Chelsea Dodson
- Rudi Dolezal
- Charles Dutoit
- Foo Fighters
- Grant Gee
- Alex Gibney
- Kevin Godley
- Gorillaz
- Brian Grazer
- Tamar Hacker
- MC Hammer
- Janie L. Hendrix
- Ron Howard
- Allen Hughes
- Michael Jackson
- Quincy Jones
- Lee Lodge
- Yo-Yo Ma
- Emmett Malloy
- Frank Marshall
- John McDermott
- Scott McFadyen
- Montreal Symphony Orchestra
- Mumford & Sons
- Doug Nichol
- Ned O'Hanlon
- Steve Pamon
- Jim Parsons
- Hart Perry
- Sam Pollard
- Bill Poveda
- Hannes Rossacher
- Martin Scorsese
- Bob Smeaton
- John Stewart
- Barbara Willis Sweete
- Russell Thomas
- Tina Turner
- Rupert Wainwright
- The Who
- Justin Wilkes

== See also ==
- List of Grammy Award categories
- List of most expensive music videos
- One shot (music video)
