= Michigan Farm Bureau =

Agricultural organization in Michigan, United States

The Michigan Farm Bureau was founded on the campus of Michigan State University in 1919. The organization's primary goal is to promote and represent the interests of its agricultural members within the state of Michigan.

There are two types of member classification within the Michigan Farm Bureau. Members are either associate members or regular members. Associate members are those who have obtained membership because they are sympathetic to the cause of the Michigan Farm Bureau, or because they would like to receive the benefits associated with a membership (such as Farm Bureau Insurance). Regular members are those who are involved with agriculture. Regular members are typically active farmers, but they can also be retired farmers, greenhouse operators, or landholders who lease their land for agricultural activities.

The Michigan Farm Bureau provides a variety of benefits and services to its members, but the most important functions for regular members are (state and federal) lobbying activities and programs and services to educate members on current agricultural issues: political, environmental or otherwise.

Other services, such as long distance telephone service, health insurance and many others, are available to both regular and associate members.

The headquarters of the Michigan Farm Bureau Family of Companies is located in Lansing, Michigan.

The current president of Michigan Farm Bureau is Ben LaCross.

== Policy development ==
The Michigan Farm Bureau calls itself a grassroots organization, with its agricultural members meeting once per year to create and vote on policy, which guides the direction of the organization for the next year.

Each member of the Michigan Farm Bureau belongs to an independently operated county Farm Bureau. There are 67 county Farm Bureaus within the state – some county Farm Bureau offices cover more than one county with lower population levels.

Each County Farm Bureau has an annual meeting when policy for that county Farm Bureau is set. During that meeting, policy is also developed for the state and national levels. State and national policies passed by majority vote at the county annual meetings are then reviewed and modified by county Farm Bureau delegates at the state annual meeting. National policies passed by majority vote at the state annual meeting are then reviewed and modified by delegates at the American Farm Bureau Federation's annual meeting.

The Michigan Farm Bureau is a member organization of both the American Farm Bureau Federation and the U.S. Farmers and Ranchers Alliance, both headed by Bob Stallman. The USFRA is a lobbying organization "of more than 80 farmer and rancher-led organizations and agricultural partners representing virtually all aspects of agriculture, working to engage in dialogue with consumers who have questions about how today’s food is grown and raised," and is funded by checkoff funds from the USDA and corporate sponsors including Monsanto and DuPont.

== History ==
The Michigan Farm Bureau was formed as an initial response to the tax situation in the early 1900s. The motor car was changing the dynamics of transportation, and Michigan's residents demanded new and improved roads for their vehicles. The state legislature determined that the best way to fund road improvements was through a tax levied on owners of land touching roadways. Because Michigan's farmers owned more land than most citizens, the tax became a burden on their lifestyle.

After its formation, the Michigan Farm Bureau successfully lobbied for shifting this tax from land owners to purchasers of gasoline.

In early 1973, the flame retardant PBB was accidentally mixed with a cattle feed supplement and then sent to a Michigan Farm Bureau Services feed mill in Battle Creek, Michigan. By the time the mix-up was discovered a year later, contaminated livestock feed had been sent to hundreds of farms. About 500 contaminated farms were quarantined. The state of Michigan killed thousands of animals and destroyed tons of animal feed and dairy products to keep the chemical out of the food system. The Gratiot Landfill in Gratiot County, Michigan, has 269,000 pounds of PBB buried, in addition to animals.

But people across the state of Michigan were already contaminated, mostly at low levels. Residents of quarantined farms had the highest levels of the chemical and formed the base of 4,000 participants for the Michigan Long-Term PBB Study, now transferred to Georgia due to lack of funds. The study is the largest one on human chemical contamination in the world.

Michigan Farm Bureau came under criticism in 2014 for its stance on changes to regulations related to the Michigan Right to Farm Act, with small farm rights advocates asserting that MFB is supporting regulations that harm small farms and favor agribusiness.

== See also ==
- The American Farm Bureau Federation
- Polybrominated biphenyl § Michigan PBB contamination incident
