= Elvis Presley single =

29-cent first-class United States postage stamp

- USPS postage stamp #2724
- Type: Commemorative postage stamp
- Country of issue: United States of America
- Date of issue: January 8, 1993–1999
- Designer: Mark Stutzman
- Printer: Bureau of Engraving and Printing
- Commemorates: Elvis Presley
- No. printed: 517,000,000
- Face value: 29¢ per stamp

The Elvis Presley single, colloquially "Young Elvis", was a 29-cent first-class United States postage stamp first available on January 8, 1993. It was released as the first stamp from the Legends of American Music stamp series. The stamp's design was the subject of a postal vote conducted by US Postal Service between two candidates. The stamp was unveiled in Graceland on what would have been Elvis Presley's 58th birthday.

== History ==
Presley, often referred to as the "King of Rock and Roll," held a unique and enduring position in American pop culture. Following the death of Elvis Presley in 1977, fans of Presley immediately began looking for ways to commemorate the rock star. At the time, the US Postal Service had a rule that any subject of artwork for a postal stamp must have been deceased for 10 years, and calls for commemorating Presley grew following the expiration of the 10-year wait period. Shortly after his confirmation as Postmaster General in 1988, Anthony Frank acknowledged the campaign for the creation of an Elvis stamp by fans.

=== Controversy ===
The idea to commemorate Presley, through the issuance of a postage stamp, which inherently represents a government document, was met with a considerable degree of controversy. The source of this controversy rose from Elvis Presley's legacy, both as a sex symbol, as well as the well-documented substance abuse issues that ultimately contributed to his untimely death. Further controversy stemmed from racial concerns regarding the source of his music.

==== Sexual iconography and drug use ====
Presley's cultural significance was intertwined with his image as a sexual icon, characterized by his distinctive dance moves and provocative stage presence. This sexual iconography, while a vital component of his appeal, provoked public debate over whether it was suitable for a figure who had become an emblem of American entertainment to be featured on an official government document.

The second element contributing to the controversy was Presley's well-documented battle with substance abuse, particularly prescription drugs, which ultimately led to his premature death. This concern coincided with the rise in the anti-drug movement. Presley's struggles with addiction raised questions about whether it was appropriate to honor an individual who had faced such significant personal challenges and succumbed to the perils of substance abuse. Many critics and concerned citizens argued that by featuring Presley on a postage stamp, the government might inadvertently appear to condone or romanticize behaviors that had led to his downfall.

==== Racial concerns ====
There were also racial concerns about making Presley the subject of a stamp; Presley had been accused of co-opting and profiting off of Black music. Critics argued that Presley's success came at a time when Black artists struggled to gain recognition and were frequently marginalized by a racially segregated music industry. The controversy was exacerbated by allegations that Presley was sometimes credited with the creation of songs, which he had not written, and that he achieved a level of fame and financial success that far exceeded that of the Black artists who had originally pioneered the musical styles he borrowed.

The 1989 song "Fight the Power" by Public Enemy commented on the racial legacy of Presley: "Elvis was a hero to most. Elvis was a hero to most. Elvis was a hero to most. But he never meant shit to me you see. Straight up racist that sucker was. Simple and plain". Further in the same verse, they directly addressed the public campaign for a stamp: "Most of my heroes don't appear on no stamps".

These racial concerns were indicative of broader societal issues, particularly in the mid-20th century, where African American musicians and artists faced systemic discrimination and often had their contributions to American culture overlooked or undervalued. The controversy over featuring Elvis Presley on a postage stamp thus became a symbol of these deeper racial tensions, as it called attention to the inequities within the entertainment industry.

== Postal ballot election ==
The mail-in ballot for selecting young Elvis or old Elvis

In the early 1990s, the USPS commissioned eight artists to create various designs for the potential stamp. In total, 60 candidate designs were submitted; from these, two competing designs were selected and presented to the general public for a mail-in election. The portrait of Presley that was ultimately selected―dubbed young Elvis―and a portrait of an older Presley wearing his iconic white jumpsuit―dubbed old Elvis―created by John Berkey.

Presidential candidate Bill Clinton endorsed the young Elvis stamp on his appearance on The Arsenio Hall Show following his performance of the Elvis song "Heartbreak Hotel" on the saxophone.

The election gained prominence and was often identified by the press as young Elvis or old Elvis election. This was the first time the USPS had opened stamp design selection to the general public. Pre-addressed ballots were available in post offices and in the April 13, 1992 edition of People magazine. The election returned more than 1.2 million ballots and young Elvis won with more than 75% of the vote.

== Design ==
The stamp was designed by illustrator Mark Stutzman. It features Presley in a yellow Civil War-era jacket and tie based on his appearance in the 1956 film Love Me Tender. Stutzman added a microphone, changed the color of the jacket, and stylized the hair and facial expression from his original reference photo. The original design was created on a 7 in × 5 in (180 mm × 130 mm) board using airbrush and acrylic paint. The design had to be simple enough to be shrunk down to the standard American postage stamp size.

== Reception ==
The stamp was released to wide critical acclaim on January 8, 1993. It was dedicated at Graceland on what would have been Presley's 58th birthday. It was released as one of seven original stamps in the Legends of American Music stamp series. The original set included stamps featured Presley, Bill Haley, Clyde McPhatter, Ritchie Valens, Otis Redding, Buddy Holly and Dinah Washington.

The Elvis Presley single is viewed as the most widely successful commemorative stamp of all time.
