= Irene Zisblatt =

Carpathian–American Holocaust survivor

- Born: 28 December 1929 (age 96); Polena, Czechoslovakia
- Known for: Holocaust survivor

Irene Zisblatt (née Zegelstein; born 28 December 1929) is a Carpathian Mountains-born American Holocaust survivor. She was an inmate in the Auschwitz-Birkenau concentration camp. She appeared in the 1998 documentary The Last Days and published her autobiography The Fifth Diamond in 2008.

A 2021 article in The Times of Israel, citing independent historian Joachim Neander, stated that there were "serious doubts about the veracity" of Zisblatt's account of her time in the concentration camps, and that many elements of her story were "implausible" and "stretch credulity", including her testimony of escaping the camp by being thrown over a ten foot wall into a passing train by a sonderkommando.

== Biography ==
Irene Zegelstein was born on 28 December 1929, in the Hungarian resort town of Polyana, in what is now Zakarpattia Oblast in Ukraine, in a house without electricity. Her father co-owned a spa, and her mother was a housewife. Around 1939, at the age of nine, she was expelled from school, since Jewish people were forbidden to leave their houses after six in the evening or before eight in the morning.

On the second night of Passover, 8 April 1944, she and her family were sent to the ghetto of Munkács, which, according to Zisblatt, consisted of a former brick factory surrounded by a fence. All houses were already full, so her family built a small tent from the tablecloths they had in their suitcases, where they slept.

Some time later, she and her family were deceived into believing they were being transferred to work in the vineyards in Tokaj, Hungary. Instead, they were sent on a train to the Auschwitz concentration camp. She was immediately separated from her family, and she was the only one of her 40 family members to survive the gas chambers. Everyone older than 45 or younger than 15 was sent immediately to the gas chambers. Her entire family, including her parents, was gassed in Gas Chamber No. 2. Before leaving, her mother gave her four diamonds to purchase bread. However, not wanting to accept the soldiers' request to put valuables inside bags, Zisblatt swallowed the diamonds her mother had sewn into her dress. She later stated that she then recovered the diamonds from her feces. After cleaning the diamonds, she repeated the process on many occasions when she was selected for testing by Josef Mengele.

With the help of another prisoner, she was able to escape Auschwitz by getting on a train traveling across tracks running near the No. 3 gas chamber. The train took her to the Neuengamme concentration camp in Germany, where shortly after, she was forced to go on a "death march" as the war wound down. After marching for days, Zisblatt states that she and her friend escaped during a dark night as they stood between two forests. The next day, they were found by American soldiers. Her friend died from disease the following day. She was adopted by an American family two years later.

Zisblatt was one of five Hungarian Holocaust survivors whose story was featured in the 1998 Academy Award-winning documentary movie, The Last Days, directed by James Moll and produced by Steven Spielberg. The documentary follows Zisblatt as she and her daughter travel back to sites of memory, including Zisblatt's childhood town, which she had not seen since her deportation in 1944. Zisblatt also visited the ghetto she was formerly placed in, before she was deported to Auschwitz. Experimental psychologist George Mastroianni, in his Times of Israel Blogs piece discussing The Last Days and a 2010 blog piece by independent scholar Joachim Neander, stated, "Neander analyzed Zisblatt's testimony and raised concerns about the factual accuracy of some of the elements of her story."

A 2021 article published in The Times of Israel stated that "serious doubts" about the veracity of Zisblatt's testimony were raised by Joachim Neander in 2010. According to Mastroianni, Irene's story is often cited by Holocaust deniers. In 2012, Neander argued that many "easily refutable" stories were an obstacle in delivering accurate Holocaust education, citing Irene Zisblatt's story as one example.

== Personal life ==
Zisblatt now lives in Broward County, Florida. She has a son Mark, a daughter Robin, five grandchildren and one great-grandchild. She frequently makes visits to American schools to talk about her personal Holocaust experiences.
