= Murder by Proxy: How America Went Postal =

Murder by Proxy
- Promotional poster
- Directed by: Emil Chiaberi
- Produced by: Emil Chiaberi; James Moll; Michael Rosen
- Narrated by: Emil Chiaberi
- Cinematography: Harris Done; John P. Tarver; Chad Wilson
- Music by: Jeffery A. Jones
- Distributed by: Aldamisa
- Release date: October 7, 2010 (Kansas Film Festival)
- Running time: 73 minutes
- Country: United States
- Language: English

Murder By Proxy: How America Went Postal is a 2010 American documentary film that examines the phenomenon of spree killing, particularly in a workplace, that became known in the United States as "going postal".

== Synopsis ==
The film argues that the phenomenon originated in the United States Postal Service as a result of hostile work environment following the Postal Reorganization Act of 1971 and then spread to the rest of society.

Filmmaker Emil Chiaberi presents a point of view that spree killings became widespread in the United States as a result of a major socio-economic shift that began during the Reagan era. The film identifies corporate greed, income inequality, diminished job security, excessive consumerism and nearly total indebtedness as contributing factors to the sense of injustice that fuels murderous rage of some individuals. Notably, the issue of gun control is completely absent from the film.

Murder By Proxy: How America Went Postal derives its title from a phrase "murder by proxy" coined by Dr. James Alan Fox, dean of the college of criminal justice at Northeastern University in Boston and one of the experts who appear in the film. Dr. Fox describes "murder by proxy" as a situation when an individual kills co-workers because "they are associated with the boss, an extension of the original target."

== Cast ==
This is a selected list of people.

- James Alan Fox - as himself, professor of criminal justice at Northeastern University.
- Anthony M. Frank - as himself, US Postmaster General (1988-1992), archived footage.
- Gary Namie - as himself, Workplace Bullying Institute.
- Rick Retelle - as himself, USPS Employee.
- Tracy Sanchez - as herself, former USPS employee.
- Patrick Sherrill - as himself, workplace shooter. He is associated with the Edmond post office shooting.
- Michael Welner - as himself, Forensic Psychiatrist, chairman of Forensic Panel.
- Charlie Withers - as himself, USPS letter carrier.

== Release ==
On July 8, 2010, the film premiered at Main Arts Theatre in Royal Oak, Michigan. It was screened for the 1991 postal massacre survivors. In September 2010, the film was shown at the CENFLO film festival in Florida.

== See also ==
- List of rampage killers (workplace killings)
- List of postal killings#United States
