= Foo Fighters: Back and Forth =

2011 film by James Moll

- Directed by: James Moll
- Produced by: James Moll; Nigel Sinclair
- Starring: Dave Grohl; William Goldsmith; Taylor Hawkins; Nate Mendel; Chris Shiflett; Pat Smear; Franz Stahl; Butch Vig
- Cinematography: Harris Done
- Edited by: Tim Calandrello
- Production companies: Spitfire Productions; Allentown Productions
- Distributed by: Exclusive Media Group; RCA Records; Back & Forth Pictures
- Release dates: March 15, 2011 (SXSW); April 5, 2011 (U.S.)
- Running time: 101 minutes
- Country: United States

Foo Fighters: Back and Forth is a 2011 rockumentary about the American rock band Foo Fighters, directed by filmmaker James Moll. The film documents the band's history and the recording process for their seventh studio album Wasting Light. The film's title is taken from a song of the same name on Wasting Light. In 2012, Back and Forth won the Grammy Award for Best Long Form Music Video.

== Background ==
The film includes material taken from over 1,000 hours of historical and new footage, and interviews with the current members of Foo Fighters, former bandmembers William Goldsmith and Franz Stahl, and producer Butch Vig. Frontman Dave Grohl has said the main inspiration for the film was the decision to record Wasting Light in the garage of his mansion in Encino, California – "Personally, I thought it would be a good idea to now tell the story of the last 16 years, so it would make more sense to watch us make a record in a garage. After selling out fucking stadiums and becoming this big rock band, why would you make a garage record? To me the first hour and 20 minutes of the movie is leading up to that moment." He also added that while the band "always believed a little mystery is important to rock’n’roll", he considered it was time to tell their story, and referencing the Tom Petty documentary Runnin' Down a Dream, "If we wait any longer, we’re going to wind up with a four-hour-long documentary".

== Release and reception ==
Back and Forth saw its debut on March 15, 2011 at the SXSW festival in Austin, Texas. The first session was followed by a surprise Foo Fighters live performance, which included the entirety of Wasting Light in its setlist.

On 12 February 2012, the documentary won a Grammy Award in the Best Long Form Music Video category.

== Charts ==
Chart (2011)	Peak position
Australian Music DVDs Chart	1
Austrian Music DVDs Chart	2
Belgian (Flanders) Music DVDs Chart	3
Belgian (Wallonia) Music DVDs Chart	7
Danish Music DVDs Chart	2
Dutch Music DVDs Chart	4
Finnish Music DVDs Chart	1
German Albums Chart	27
Irish Music DVDs Chart	2
Italian Music DVDs Chart	6
New Zealand Music DVDs Chart	1
Norwegian Music DVDs Chart	1
Spanish Music DVDs Chart	10
Swedish Music DVDs Chart	1
Swiss Music DVDs Chart	4
UK Music Videos Chart	1
US DVDs Chart	1

== Certifications ==
Region	Certification	Certified units/sales
Australia (ARIA)	2× Platinum	30,000^{^}
United Kingdom (BPI)	Gold	25,000^{^}
United States (RIAA)	Gold	50,000^{^}
^{^} Shipments figures based on certification alone.

== Awards ==
Year	Award	Work	Results
2012	NME Award Best Music Film	Back and Forth	Won
2012	Grammy Award for Best Long Form Music Video	Back and Forth	Won

== See also ==
- Foo Fighters: Sonic Highways
