= U.S. Farmers and Ranchers Alliance =

- Formation: 2011
- Type: Agricultural organization
- Purpose: Agriculture
- Location: Chesterfield, Missouri
- Region served: United States
- Key people: Erin Fitzgerald (CEO); Brad Greenway (Chairman); Bob Stallman; Randy Krotz
- Revenue: $11,000,000
- Website: http://www.fooddialogues.com

The U.S. Farmers and Ranchers Alliance is an alliance of agriculture related interest groups and organizations that promote industrial agriculture in the United States. Their aim is to promote a positive image of modern agricultural practices. They are supported by checkoff funds from the United States Department of Agriculture and by cooperate donations. The alliance has been criticized for a bias towards corporate agricultural practices.

== Origin and aims ==
The alliance was created in October 2010 as a coalition of many of the United States largest agricultural groups (e.g., National Corn Growers Association and National Pork Producers Council) to counter publicity that the alliance believed was not in the best interest of agriculture. The alliance has been concerned with the release of videos showing the mistreatment of pigs, chickens put into battery cages to lay eggs, chicks tossed into meat grinders, close confinement of livestock, and the use of hormones and antibiotics in feed. They are also concerned with negative publicity crop farmers have received from organizations opposed to biotech crops and the overuse of pesticides and fertilizers.

Their view is that a utopian world without genetically modified food, pesticides, and fertilizers is not feasible if the goal is to feed the world. The alliance's aim is to show the food consumer that a less than perfect world is reasonable. They believe that the vast majority of people who do not live in rural areas of America are misinformed about how food is produced. On their view, non-rural people have been misled into believing that all pesticide, fertilizer, and antibiotic uses in agriculture are harmful; their aim is to show the consumer that this is not true.

== Management ==
In 2011, its annual budget of $11,000,000 came in large part from marketing fees or checkoffs from the United States Department of Agriculture. These mandatory fees are paid by farmers after they sell their products. In June 2018 Erin Fitzgerald was named CEO of the alliance, taking over from Randy Krotz. Krotz had been hired as the alliance's first CEO in 2014. The Chairman of the alliance's Board of Directors is Charles Bowling, former president of the National Corn Growers Association. Prior to Bowling the Chairman had been Brad Greenway.

== Activities ==
Checkoff funds from the United States Department of Agriculture cannot be used to lobby government. In 2010, the USDA ruled that the alliance could only use checkoff funds for specific projects and activities. Their website contains qualitative information on crop cultivation, livestock care, and the general lives of farmers in the US.

In 2011, the alliance commissioned a survey of farmers, ranchers, and consumers. A total of 2,417 consumers and 1,002 farmers and ranchers were surveyed. Seventy-two percent of consumers said that they knew little or nothing about farming or ranching and 86% of farmers and ranchers believed that consumers knew little or nothing about farming. Forty-two percent of consumers believed that food production was heading in the wrong direction, while 58% of farmers and ranchers believed that consumers have an inaccurate perception of farming and ranching.

With the aim of bridging the gap between consumers and farmers, the alliance launched a search in June 2012 for a national spokesperson. Will Gilmer, of Lamar County, Alabama was selected. He received a $10,000 stipend to defray the cost of spending time away from his farm and he had the opportunity to select an agricultural related charity for a $5,000 donation from the alliance.

The alliance funded the making of a documentary film, Farmland, that opened in select theaters in the United States on May 1, 2014. The aim of the documentary was to counter the messages about modern agriculture in recent documentaries such as Food, Inc. and King Corn. They hired James Moll as director who agreed to do it only if he had creative control.

In 2016 the alliance founded the non-profit U.S. Farming and Ranching Foundation, which furthers agricultural education, particularly among the youth. One of the main activities of the alliance are “food dialogues”, of which it ran around thirty between 2010 and 2018. The intention of the dialogues is to promote debate over issues, including some that are considered controversial. Some of the alliance's messages promote the use of technology to create food sustainability.

== Criticism ==
In 2011, Bill Deusing, head of the Northeast Organic Farming Association has criticized the alliance for not including enough organic farming representatives.

The alliance has been criticized potential bias towards Big Ag, and that its website tends to support industrial agriculture such as genetically modified crops, while questioning the value of alternative agricultural practices (e.g., free-range chickens). Randy Krotz, previous CEO) of the alliance, told Bloomberg Businessweek that the alliance does not favor one form of agriculture over another and that "My personal feeling is, there is a lot of information there on every side of agriculture."

Robert Lawrence of Johns Hopkins University wrote in a Huffington Post blog that criticized the alliance for its stance on the use of antibiotics in animal foods in agriculture.

== See also ==
- Animal Agriculture Alliance
