= Inheritance (2006 film) =

- Directed by: James Moll
- Produced by: James Moll; Christopher Pavlick
- Starring: Vivian Delman; Monica Hertwig; Reinhardt Hertwig; Helen Jonas
- Cinematography: Harris Done
- Edited by: James Moll
- Music by: Andrés Goldstein; Daniel Tarrab
- Production company: Allentown Productions
- Distributed by: PBS
- Release date: June 25, 2006 (LA Film Festival)
- Running time: 75 minutes
- Country: United States
- Language: English

Inheritance is a 2006 American documentary film about Monika Hertwig, also known as Monika Christiane Knauss, the daughter of Ruth Irene Kalder and Amon Göth, commandant of the Płaszów concentration camp. Monika Hertwig was 10 months old when her father was hanged in 1946 for war crimes, crimes against humanity and genocide. She discovered the truth about him only as a young adult, because her own mother told her in childhood that he was a good man and a war hero. The film centers around her meeting a Holocaust survivor, Helen Jonas-Rosenzweig, who was interned at Płaszów and personally knew Göth.

The film was produced for PBS by James Moll, film director, documentary producer and the Founding Executive Director of the USC Shoah Foundation Institute focusing on testimonies of the Holocaust survivors. In 2009, Inheritance was nominated by the National Academy of Television Arts and Sciences and received an Emmy Award in the category of Outstanding Interview.

== Synopsis ==
In the documentary, Monika Hertwig travels to Płaszów on the outskirts of Kraków, Poland in an attempt to learn more about her father, SS-Hauptsturmführer Amon Göth, who was portrayed in Steven Spielberg's 1993 film Schindler's List by British actor, Ralph Fiennes. The film had deeply affected Monika, and she claims to have hated Spielberg after watching it. In her search for more information, Hertwig has a meeting at the scene of the former concentration camp with Helen Jonas-Rosenzweig, a Holocaust survivor born in Kraków, who was interned at Płaszów, and was forced to work as a maid for Amon Göth. She survived the Holocaust with the help of German businessman Oskar Schindler. More than 60 years after Göth's execution for war crimes, the two women first met there in person.

Amon Göth had two Jewish housemaids who stayed with him in the villa: Helen ("Lena") Hirsch (now Helen Horowitz, living in Israel) and Helen ("Susanna") Sternlicht (now Helen Jonas-Rosenzweig, living in the United States). As part of Monika Hertwig's search for more answers, she was given the opportunity to meet the woman from the Kraków Ghetto enslaved and preyed upon by her father during the Holocaust in Poland. Göth abused Helen and shot her boyfriend, a Jewish boy named Adam, dead in front of her.

Göth was a married man, with a wife Anni, and two children in Vienna, when he met Monika's mother Ruth Irene Kalder – a beautician and aspiring actress originally from Gliwice (or Wrocław, sources vary) – through his friend Oskar Schindler in Kraków in 1942 (or early in 1943). She worked as secretary at Schindler's factory at that time. The two had an ostentatious camp affair which Göth's Austrian wife knew nothing about. They partied, played tennis and rode horseback together. Ruth saw him hunting humans (in fact, he killed hundreds), but in a 1983 interview with the BBC she attempted to defend him nevertheless. During this interview, she was shown the transcripts of his war crimes trial. She was dying of emphysema and committed suicide a day later. Monika, who was 37 years old at the time of the interview, thus first heard her mother speak frankly on the subject of her father, to total strangers. Monika Hertwig, Göth's illegitimate child, and his camp maid Helen Jonas-Rosenzweig, met for the first time in 2004. Hertwig had requested the meeting with Jonas, but Jonas was hesitant because her memories of the past were so traumatic. She eventually agreed after Hertwig wrote to her: "We have to do it for the murdered people." Jonas shared her sentiment and offered to meet at the Płaszów Memorial Monument in Poland and tour Göth's villa with her for the documentary Inheritance; her husband had committed suicide in 1980 suffering from survivor's guilt. James Moll, the film's director, brought the women together in front of a camera in order to make his film.

== Release ==
Inheritance was completed in 2006. It was produced by James Moll's company Allentown Productions. The primary footage was shot over the course of 13 days on location in Poland, but footage was also shot at Helen's home in New Jersey and on the outskirts of Munich, where Monika lived. The film premiered on June 25, 2006, at the Los Angeles Film Festival and was shown internationally as Der Mördervater in Germany, as Förintelsens arv in Sweden, and as My Father was a Nazi Commandant (TV title) in the UK.

== Critical response ==
The documentary received critical acclaim and positive reviews from a number of critics, including David Cornelius of DVD Review ("simple but stunning documentary"), William Lee of DVD Verdict ("a remarkable story"), Professor Cynthia Fuchs at PopMatters ("they live with the past, each moment a lesson"), and Michael Atkinson of IFC ("a fascinating dialectic for a number of reasons").

== Production notes ==
James Moll said in production notes that he first came in contact with Monika Hertwig in 2003 only to ask her permission to use photographs of Amon Göth for a separate project connected with Schindler's List video release. He expected the worst but changed his attitude upon hearing her speak. One of her statements became the genesis of Inheritance for him. "I am not my father" she said. Around the same time, Moll was introduced to Helen Jonas-Rosenzweig through Shoah Foundation of the University of Southern California.

== See also ==
- Jennifer Teege, daughter of Monika Hertwig
- My Grandfather Would Have Shot Me, a memoir by Teege about discovering her family's past
