= Farmland (film) =

- Poster for Farmland
- Directed by: James Moll
- Produced by: James Moll; Christopher Pavlick
- Starring: Brad Bellah; Leighton Cooley; David Loberg; Sutton Morgan; Margaret Schlass; Ryan Veldhuizen
- Cinematography: Harris Done
- Edited by: Tim Calandrello
- Music by: Nathan Wang
- Production company: Allentown Productions
- Distributed by: D&E Entertainment
- Release dates: March 18, 2014 (Cleveland International Film Festival); May 1, 2014 (United States)
- Running time: 77 minutes
- Country: United States
- Language: English

Farmland is a documentary film about agriculture in the United States that was funded by the U.S. Farmers and Ranchers Alliance. Six farmers and Ranchers across the United States describe their experiences of and views on modern agriculture. Critics view the farmers and ranchers as sincere and what they do as interesting, but they are critical of what is left out of the documentary and that it was funded by the U.S. Farmers and Ranchers Alliance.

== Plot ==
The goal of the film is to bridge the gap between food growers and food consumers by presenting farmers' and ranchers' perspectives on producing food. The film aims to do this by focusing on the lives of six farmers in their 20s who describe their experiences of and views on modern farming and ranching in the United States. They each show and explain what it is like to farm and ranch with modern agriculture practices. They express their views on controversial topics such as genetically modified crops, the use of antibiotics in animal feeds, and the treatment of farm animals.

== Cast ==
The main cast of the documentary consists of six farmers and ranchers from different rural areas in the United States.

- Brad Bellah from Throckmorton, Texas is a sixth generation cattle rancher.
- Leighton Cooley from Roberta in Crawford County, Georgia is a fourth generation poultry farmer.
- David Loberg from near Carroll, Nebraska is a fifth-generation farmer who grows corn and soybeans.
- Sutton Morgan from Brawley, California is a fourth generation farmer who grows organic onions.
- Margaret Schlass from near Pittsburgh, Pennsylvania started an organic farming business called "One Woman Farm, Inc."
- Ryan Veldhuizen from near Hatfield, Minnesota is a fourth generation farmer who raises hogs and grows corn and soybeans to feed them.

== Critical reception ==
Reviewers generally agree that farmers and ranchers in this documentary come across as sincere and committed to their lifestyle. The movie is viewed as presenting an interesting portrayal of what it is like to farm and ranch for family farmers and ranchers across the United States. It has been criticized for giving an incomplete view of modern industrial agriculture. For example, the production of animal products such as eggs and poultry is done mainly by corporate farming and not small family farms. Controversial issues such as the use of genetically modified crops, the use of pesticides, the use of antibiotics in animal feeds, and the treatment of animals on farms are largely dismissed in the film according to reviewers. Finally, reviewers question the aims of the movie because it was funded by U.S. Farmers and Ranchers Alliance.
