= Larry Tanz =

American entertainment industry executive

- Education: BA, MS, and MBA
- Alma mater: Harvard University and Wharton School of the University of Pennsylvania
- Occupation: Entertainment executive
- Employer: Netflix
- Title: VP, Global Television
- Spouse: Sara Messeloff

Larry Tanz is an American entertainment industry executive. He has held executive positions with AOL Time Warner, and previously served as president and CEO of LivePlanet, as well as the president and CEO of Vuguru. He is currently the VP of Global Television at Netflix.

== Early life and education ==
In 1988, Tanz graduated from the Ramaz School in Manhattan. In 1992, he graduated with a BA in Psychology from Harvard University. He also earned an MS in Behavioral Psychology from Harvard and an MBA from the Wharton School of the University of Pennsylvania in 1999. At Harvard, he served on the staff of the Harvard Lampoon. His published research as a graduate student included the study of addiction, in addition to experiments on decision mechanisms of laboratory animals.

== Career ==
=== Early career ===
Tanz worked as a Senior Associate at Mercer Management Consulting (now named Oliver Wyman). He left Mercer to become the Director of Strategy and Operations for AOL Time Warner. At AOLTW, he was also a founder of Netscape Netbusiness. He remained with AOLTW until 2000.

=== LivePlanet ===
Tanz worked with LivePlanet from its founding in 2000. He served four years as CEO and president of the company, which was founded by Matt Damon, Ben Affleck, Sean Bailey, and Chris Moore. He oversaw strategy and operations, as well as projects for the company, including serving as an executive producer for Project Greenlight. While there he created partnerships with studios including Universal, Miramax, ABC, NBC, MTV, E! and Spike TV. He also served as a producer on related film projects like the horror film Feast as well as documentaries like First Descent and Running the Sahara. Tanz also executive produced other television series including the reality show American Start-Up.

While there, Tanz described many of his digital projects as allowing audience members to determine the degree of involvement they want in the stories being told, describing the method as providing a "treasure hunt for waders, swimmers, and divers"—indicating the varying level of interaction an audience member could have with the story. Tanz remained with LivePlanet until the shuttering of its film division in 2008.

=== Agility Studios ===
In 2008, Tanz co-founded Agility Studios, along with Scott Ehrlich and Keith Quinn. Agility Studios is a multiplatform production. Among the projects Tanz produced at Agility was The Legion of Extraordinary Dancers by Jon M Chu. They started the firm with $7 million in venture capital funding. Shannon Pruitt also joined the firm, which specialized in digital content.

=== Vuguru ===
In December 2009, Tanz was hired as the president of Vuguru, as Vuguru became a stand-alone entity (after the joint investment by Rogers Media and Michael Eisner's The Tornante Company). Variety said of his role that in addition to overseeing the scripted television and web series Vuguru produced, "A big part of Tanz’s job will be enlisting sponsorship and finding creative ways to work with brands to help finance the various series." Tanz was promoted to the role of CEO and president in February 2012. During his tenure as CEO, Tanz expanded Vuguru's investment in long form scripted web series. Tanz further expanded business into long form television series, hiring the former president of programming at Comedy Central Lauren Corrao. He has been interviewed regarding the effects of the Internet on television viewership and profit margins, stating that Internet video portals have begun to ebb away significantly at the importance of network television broadcasts. He discussed the further success of digital-first programming after the first Emmy nominations for digital programming in 2013 in an interview with Bloomberg News, stating, "Remember, it wasn’t that long ago when cable shows weren’t even eligible to win Emmys or be nominated. And now, cable entirely dominates the Emmy’s. So, we’re now seeing it be repeated again with digital."

=== Netflix ===
In November 2014, Tanz was hired by Netflix as Vice President of Content Acquisition for Europe. He was then elevated to the position of VP, Global Television. In this job, Tanz has commissioned several television shows from the UK market.

== Philanthropy ==
Tanz co-founded a charity in 2006 with partners Matt Damon, Keith Quinn, and Marc Joubert which later became known as H2O Africa Foundation and then water.org. Tanz continues to sit on the organization's board.

== Personal life ==
He is married to Sara Messeloff, a 1990 Ramaz School alumni.
