= My Grandfather Would Have Shot Me =

2013 memoir by Jennifer Teege with Nikola Sellmair

- First edition (German)
- Author: Jennifer Teege with Nikola Sellmair
- Original title: Amon: Mein Großvater hätte mich erschossen
- Translator: Carolin Sommer
- Illustrator: Thorsten Wulff
- Publisher: Rowohlt Verlag
- Publication date: 2013
- ISBN: 1615192530
- OCLC: 881665500

My Grandfather Would Have Shot Me: A Black Woman Discovers Her Family's Nazi Past (German release title: Amon. Mein Großvater hätte mich erschossen) is a memoir by German writer Jennifer Teege. It covers her discovery that her grandfather was Amon Göth, nicknamed the "Butcher of Płaszów" and infamously depicted in Steven Spielberg's 1993 film Schindler's List. Teege was adopted and learned about her family history after reading a biography of her biological mother, Monika Hertwig.

The book was published in the United Kingdom and United States on 14 April 2015 through The Experiment publishing and was co-written by Nikola Sellmair, translated by Carolin Sommer. The work details Teege's discovery of her ancestry and her attempts to come to terms with this revelation. Teege decides to research her family and travels to Israel and Kraków. Through this she also tries to reconnect with her estranged biological mother.

== Reception ==
Critical reception for the book has been positive and My Grandfather Would Have Shot Me has received praise from the Seattle Times, Washington Post, and The Sunday Times. The Jewish Book Council and the News Tribune also praised the book, with the News Tribune stating that it resonated with them "because it demonstrates that we are a product of our past, but we don't have to be bound by it. Ultimately, it is up to us to understand we cannot change the past, but it is we who are in charge of our future." In contrast, Maclean's panned the work, stating that it was a "dull affair" and "brings new and unintended meaning to the banality of evil". An extract from the English translation was published in the 2019 anthology New Daughters of Africa, edited by Margaret Busby.

== See also ==
- Inheritance, a 2006 documentary film about Monika Hertwig, Teege's mother, the daughter of Amon Göth
