= Running the Sahara =

- Directed by: James Moll
- Produced by: Rick Eldridge; Marc Joubert; James Moll; Keith Quinn; Larry Tanz; Michael Rosen
- Narrated by: Matt Damon
- Cinematography: Harris Done
- Edited by: Ricky Kreitman
- Production company: LivePlanet
- Release date: 2007
- Running time: 102 minutes
- Country: United States
- Language: English

Running the Sahara is a 2007 documentary feature film that chronicles Ray Zahab, Charlie Engle, and Kevin Lin's attempt to run across the entire Sahara Desert. They traveled a total of 6920 kilometers, reaching the Red Sea on February 20, 2007.

Producers Marc Joubert, Keith Quinn, Larry Tanz and director James Moll filmed on location in Africa across six countries: Senegal, Mauritania, Mali, Niger, Libya, Egypt. Prepare2go.com supported the film's crew with logistics throughout.
