= The Last Days =

- Directed by: James Moll
- Produced by: June Beallor; Kenneth Lipper
- Music by: Hans Zimmer
- Production company: Survivors of the Shoah Visual History Foundation
- Distributed by: October Films
- Release dates: October 23, 1998 (Los Angeles); February 5, 1999 (United States)
- Running time: 87 minutes
- Country: United States
- Languages: English, German and Hungarian

The Last Days is a 1998 American documentary film directed by James Moll and produced by June Beallor and Kenneth Lipper; Steven Spielberg, in his role as founder of the Shoah Foundation, was one of the film's executive producers. The film tells the stories of five Hungarian Jews during the Holocaust (also known as the Shoah), focusing on the last year of World War II, when Nazi Germany occupied Hungary and began mass deportations of Jews in the country to concentration and extermination camps, primarily Auschwitz. It depicts the horrors of life in the camps, but also stresses the optimism and perseverance of the survivors.

The film won the Academy Award for Best Documentary Feature at the 71st Academy Awards. It was remastered and re-released on Netflix on May 19, 2021.

== Content ==
The film includes archival footage, photographs, and documents, as well as new interviews with Holocaust survivors Bill Basch, Irene Zisblatt, Renée Firestone, Alice Lok Cahana, Tom Lantos, Randolph Braham, and Dario Gabbai. The filmmakers take the first five of those, who all immigrated to the United States after WWII, back to visit their hometowns and the sites of the camps to which they were sent. Former Representative Lantos (D-CA) was the only Holocaust survivor ever elected to the United States Congress. He was saved by Swedish diplomat Raoul Wallenberg, who hid Lantos in Budapest.

There are also interviews with U.S. army veterans Paul Parks and Katsugo Miho, G.I.'s who helped liberate Dachau concentration camp. Former SS doctor Hans Münch, who was acquitted of war crimes at the Nuremberg trials, is interviewed about his experiences at Auschwitz concentration camp.

== Release ==
The Last Days was first released in 1998, and it was remastered and re-released worldwide on Netflix on May 19, 2021. It was produced by June Beallor, Kenneth Lipper, Steven Spielberg, and the Survivors of the Shoah Visual History Foundation.

== Critical response ==
The Last Days received positive reviews from film critics. It holds a 92% approval rating on review aggregator website Rotten Tomatoes, based on 24 reviews. On Metacritic, the film has a score of 85 out of 100, based on 25 critics.

According to Radheyan Simonpillai of The Guardian: "The film’s thesis is that the Nazis were so fueled by hatred that they would sacrifice their position in the war in order to carry out the genocide, deporting 438,000 Hungarian Jews to Auschwitz within a six-week period." Roger Ebert wrote for the Chicago Sun-Times that the film "focuses on the last year of the war, when Adolf Hitler, already defeated and with his resources running out, revealed the depth of his racial hatred by diverting men and supplies to the task of exterminating Hungary's Jews." In New York magazine, John Leonard wrote: "It is a story told by five survivors of that fast-forward genocide, all of them naturalized American citizens, who return to the cities and villages from which they were seized, and to the camps to which they were committed."

Marc Savlov of The Austin Chronicle wrote: "Moll's film is a far cry from the elegiac poetry of, say, Night and Fog; it's a document more than an examination, and its power of record is inarguable and incorruptible." Barbara Shulgasser-Parker, former film critic for the San Francisco Examiner, wrote for Common Sense Media that "The horrors described by survivors of the death camps, the soldiers who liberated them, and historians, as well as photographs and archival footage, make this important and educational but best suited to teens and older."

== See also ==
- List of Holocaust films
