= Jennifer Teege =

German writer (born 1970)

- Born: Jennifer Göth; 29 June 1970 (age 56); Munich, Bavaria, West Germany
- Education: Sorbonne University
- Occupation: Author
- Children: 2
- Relatives: Monika Hertwig (mother); Ruth Irene Kalder (maternal grandmother)
- Writing career
- Language: German
- Period: 2015–present
- Genre: memoir
- Notable work: My Grandfather Would Have Shot Me: A Black Woman Discovers Her Family's Nazi Past (2015)

Jennifer Teege (born 29 June 1970) is a German writer. Her maternal grandfather was Austrian SS Nazi concentration camp commander and war criminal Amon Göth. Her 2015 book My Grandfather Would Have Shot Me: A Black Woman Discovers Her Family's Nazi Past was a New York Times bestseller.

== Life ==
Teege, who was born Jennifer Göth to a Nigerian father and an Austrian-German mother, grew up in foster care. She was adopted at the age of seven. Her grandmother was Ruth Irene Kalder, who had a two-year relationship with Amon Göth until the end of the Second World War, and with whom she had a daughter, Monika Hertwig, who was born in November 1945 and whom he never met. Teege studied at the Sorbonne, and learned Hebrew in Israel where she studied for five years.

At the age of 38, Teege unexpectedly found out about her family history, by picking up a book in a Hamburg library that happened to be her mother Monika Hertwig's biography and where she discovered that Amon Göth was her grandfather, which caused her to plunge into a severe depression. She decided to combat her depression and come to terms with this revelation by writing her book My Grandfather Would Have Shot Me. Her book was a success and became a New York Times bestseller. Translations of the book, which was originally published in Teege's native language, German, have been made into Danish, English, French, Hebrew, Hungarian, Italian, Dutch, Polish, Portuguese, Russian, and Spanish.

== Works ==
- Jennifer Teege, Nikola Sellmair: Amon. Mein Großvater hätte mich erschossen. Rowohlt, Reinbek bei Hamburg, 2013, ISBN 978-3-498-06493-8.
  - English edition: My Grandfather Would Have Shot Me: A Black Woman Discovers Her Family's Nazi Past. Translated by Carolin Sommer. Workman Publishing Company. 15 April 2015. pp. 2–. ISBN 978-1-61519-253-3.

== Holy Holocaust ==
In 2021, Noa Berman-Herzberg, Teege's Israeli friend and granddaughter of Holocaust survivors, partnered with Osi Wald to direct a locally animated autobiographical short film titled Holy Holocaust. Berman-Herzberg narrates the film, while Teege is voiced by German-Israeli actress Gabriela Börschmann.

In Holy Holocaust, Berman-Herzberg narrates of her friendship with Teege and how it was affected by the latter being Göth's granddaughter and the publication of My Grandfather Would Have Shot Me.

Holy Holocaust premiered on September 1, 2021, as a Jerusalem Film Festival entry.

In 2022, The New Yorker acquired the streaming rights to Holy Holocaust and uploaded it on its official website and YouTube channel.

== See also ==
- Afro-Germans, the ethnic group which Teege is a part of
- Inheritance (2006 film), a PBS documentary about Monika Hertwig, Teege's mother
