= First Descent =

- Directed by: Kemp Curly; Kevin Harrison
- Produced by: Kemp Curly; Kevin Harrison
- Starring: Shaun White; Hannah Teter; Shawn Farmer; Nick Perata; Terje Håkonsen
- Cinematography: Scott Duncan
- Edited by: Jon Philpot
- Production company: MD Films
- Distributed by: Universal Pictures
- Release date: December 2, 2005
- Running time: 110 minutes
- Language: English

First Descent is a 2005 documentary film about snowboarding and its beginning in the 1980s.

The snowboarders featured in this movie (Shawn Farmer, Nick Perata, Terje Haakonsen, Hannah Teter and Shaun White with guest appearances from Travis Rice) represent three generations of snowboarders and the progress that the sport has made over the past two decades. Most of the movie was shot in Alaska and its back country.

It is the first movie to be produced and financed by the soft-drink company Mountain Dew.

== Credits ==
- Kemp Curly - producer, editor
- Kevin Harrison - producer, director
- Marc Joubert - co-producer
- John Kaplan - co-producer
- Jack Kelly - coordinating producer
- Paula Martone - line producer
- Larry Tanz - executive producer

== Reception ==
On review aggregator website Rotten Tomatoes, the film holds an approval rating of 54% based on 64 reviews, with an average rating of 5.9/10.

== See also ==
- Step Into Liquid
