= Anthony M. Frank =

American banker and politician (1931–2022)

Anthony Frank

69th United States Postmaster General
- In office March 1, 1988 – July 6, 1992
- President: Ronald Reagan; George H. W. Bush
- Preceded by: Preston Robert Tisch
- Succeeded by: Marvin Travis Runyon

Personal details
- Born: Anthony Melchior Frank; May 21, 1931 Berlin, Germany
- Died: February 2, 2022 (aged 90) Carmel, California, U.S.
- Spouse(s): Gay Frank; Joey Shepard
- Children: 2
- Education: Dartmouth College (BA, MBA)

Anthony Melchior Frank (May 21, 1931 – February 2, 2022) was an American banker who served as the United States Postmaster General from 1988 to 1992.

== Early life ==
On May 21, 1931, Frank was born in Berlin, Germany. Frank's father was Lothar Frank (1900–1985). Frank's paternal grandfather was Sigismund Frank (1848–1930), a banker. Frank's paternal grandmother was Lina Rothschild (1865–1960). At age six, he and his family moved from Germany to the United States. Frank attended Hollywood High School.

== Education ==
Frank earned a bachelor's degree from Dartmouth College, and an MBA from the Tuck School of Business at Dartmouth College. He also did postgraduate work in finance at the University of Vienna.

== Career ==
Frank was the CEO of First Nationwide Bank in San Francisco, California.

In 1988, Frank was appointed as the United States Postmaster General by the Governors of U.S. Postal Service effective March 1, 1988. He resigned the post in 1992.

In 1992, Frank started Independent Bancorp of Arizona.

Frank died in Carmel, California on February 2, 2022, at the age of 90.

== Filmography ==
- 1991 Murder, She Wrote - The Skinny According to Nick Cullhane episode (season 7). The mailman.
- 2010 Murder by Proxy: How America Went Postal - as himself, U.S. Postmaster General.

== See also ==
- List of Murder, She Wrote episodes#Season 7 (1990–91)
- Bruno Frank

Government offices
Preceded by Preston Tisch	United States Postmaster General; 1988–1992	Succeeded by Marvin Runyon
