= James Moll =

American film director

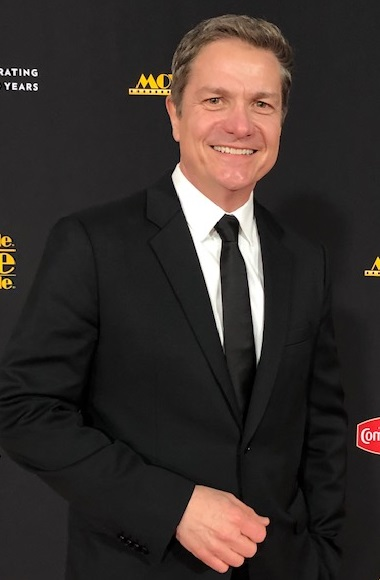
- James Moll at the Movieguide Awards in February 2019.
- Born: James Moll; Allentown, Pennsylvania, U.S.
- Education: USC School of Cinematic Arts
- Occupation: Filmmaker
- Years active: 1987–present
- Website: www.allentownproductions.com

James Moll is an American director and producer of film documentaries and television documentaries. His documentary work has earned him an Academy Award, two Emmys, and a Grammy. Moll's production company, Allentown Productions Inc., was based at Universal Studios from 1994 to 2018, primarily producing non-fiction film and television projects. Moll also served for ten years on the executive committee of the documentary branch of the Academy of Motion Picture Arts and Sciences, and is the founding chair of the documentary committee for the Directors Guild of America.

== Early life and education ==
Moll was born in Allentown, Pennsylvania and attended and graduated from the USC School of Cinematic Arts in 1987.

== Career ==
=== Film and television ===
Moll began his professional career as an intern reading scripts for film producer Lauren Shuler Donner, who later hired him as an assistant to French writer-director Francis Veber for Veber's American remake of "Les Fugitifs", Three Fugitives.

In 1996, Moll's first documentary as producer, Survivors of the Holocaust, received two Prime Time Emmy Awards and a third nomination.

In March 1999, James Moll received the Academy Award for Best Documentary Feature for directing The Last Days. Steven Spielberg is executive producer of the film, which chronicles the lives of five Hungarian Jews during the Holocaust.

He directed and produced the feature-length documentary Price for Peace, which premiered prime time on NBC in 2002 and was hosted by Tom Brokaw; the late author Stephen Ambrose and Steven Spielberg are its executive producers. The film focuses on America's involvement in the Pacific Theater of Operations during World War II. It was produced in collaboration with DreamWorks and The National WWII Museum in New Orleans.

Moll directed and produced the 2007 feature-length documentary Running the Sahara about three men who ran 4,300 miles across the Sahara desert from Senegal to Egypt. Matt Damon is executive producer of the film, which promotes Water.org, formerly the H2O Africa Foundation, co-founded by Damon to raise awareness of clean water initiatives in Africa.

In 2009, Moll was nominated for two Emmy Awards winning one of them, from the National Academy of Television Arts & Sciences for Inheritance. The film profiles Monika Göth Hertwig and her struggle dealing with her father's involvement in The Holocaust. Monika's father, S.S. Captain Amon Göth, who attained international notoriety after being portrayed by Ralph Fiennes in Schindler's List was executed for war crimes in 1946.

Moll directed the 2011 feature documentary Foo Fighters: Back and Forth, profiling rock band Foo Fighters' career. In 2012, Moll won a Grammy Award for "Best Music Video, Long Form" for the documentary.

Moll directed the 2017 documentary Obey Giant, which chronicles artist Shepard Fairey's personal story from his Charleston, South Carolina origins through his emergence as an iconoclastic brand. It also examines the relationship between street art, activism, punk rock, and politics. Producers of the film include actor James Franco.

In 2018, Moll completed his work (Note: Moll served as an executive producer of the entire docu-series and directed three of the eight episodes.) on the Netflix television docuseries Medal of Honor in concert with executive producer Robert Zemeckis. The documentary miniseries profiles the acts of heroism and selflessness exhibited by eight American soldiers who were awarded the Medal of Honor, the U.S. military's highest and most prestigious military honor for acts of valor.

=== Shoah Foundation ===
Moll is founding executive director of the USC Shoah Foundation's Institute for Visual History and Education, also known as the Shoah Foundation. He established the non-profit organization with June Beallor in 1994 for Steven Spielberg. Moll and Beallor ran the day-to-day operations the Shoah Foundation from its inception in 1994 until 1998, and later worked with the foundation on the production of documentaries. Shoah Foundation's objective was collecting tens of thousands of videotaped testimonies from survivors of The Holocaust around the world; within five years, the foundation collected over 52,000 such testimonies in 32 languages.

== Filmography ==
Selected credits in film and television
Year	Title	Credited as		Notes
Year	Title	Director	Producer	Notes
2018	Medal of Honor	Yes	Yes	TV series documentary; credited as executive producer (8 episodes) & director (3 episodes)
2018	Days That Shaped America	No	Yes	TV series documentary; credited as executive producer
2017	Obey Giant	Yes	Yes	Documentary
2017	Trenches of Rock	No	Yes	Documentary; credited as executive producer
2015	Mully	No	Yes	Documentary; credited as executive producer
2015	Living in the Age of Airplanes	No	Yes	Documentary; credited as executive producer
2015	Auschwitz	Yes	No	Documentary short
2014	Farmland	Yes	Yes	Documentary
2012	Always Faithful	No	Yes	Documentary
2011	A Path to Honor	No	Yes	TV series documentary; credited as executive producer
2011	Foo Fighters: Back and Forth	Yes	Yes	Winner: Grammy Award for "Best Music Video, Long Form"
2010	Murder by Proxy: How America Went Postal	No	Yes	Documentary
2010	When I Rise	No	Yes	Documentary
2008	Running the Sahara	Yes	Yes	Documentary
2008	New Kids on the Block: A Behind the Music Special	No	Yes	TV movie documentary; credited as executive producer
2008	A Timeless Call	No	Yes	Documentary short
2006	Inheritance	Yes	Yes	Winner: Emmy Award for "Outstanding Interview" – also credited as editor
2006	Ten Days that Unexpectedly Changed America: Massacre at Mystic	Yes	Yes	TV series documentary
2004	The Four Chaplains: Sacrifice at Sea	Yes	Yes	TV movie documentary
2004	A Remarkable Promise	Yes	Yes	Short film
2004	Voices from the List	No	Yes	Video documentary; credited as producer and executive producer
2003	Burma Bridge Busters	Yes	Yes	TV movie documentary
2002	Price for Peace	Yes	Yes	Documentary
2002	I Remember	No	Yes	Documentary
2002	Broken Silence	No	Yes	TV mini-series documentary
2000	Eyes of the Holocaust	No	Yes	Documentary
1998	The Last Days	Yes	No	Winner: Academy Award for "Best Documentary (Feature)" – also credited as editor
1997	The Lost Children of Berlin	No	Yes	Documentary; credited as executive producer
1996	Survivors of the Holocaust	No	Yes	Winner: Emmy Award for "Outstanding Informational Special"
1992	Out on a Limb	No	Yes	Comedy; credited as associate producer
