= The Iron Giant =

1999 animated film by Brad Bird

- Theatrical release poster
- Directed by: Brad Bird
- Screenplay by: Tim McCanlies; Brad Bird (Note: Although McCanlies received sole screenplay credit in the original theatrical prints and home video releases, Bird is credited in the film's 2015 restoration and the Signature Edition.)
- Story by: Brad Bird
- Based on: The Iron Man: A Children's Story in Five Nights by Ted Hughes
- Produced by: Allison Abbate; Des McAnuff
- Starring: Jennifer Aniston; Harry Connick Jr.; Vin Diesel; James Gammon; Cloris Leachman; John Mahoney; Eli Marienthal; Christopher McDonald; M. Emmet Walsh
- Cinematography: Steven Wilzbach
- Edited by: Darren T. Holmes
- Music by: Michael Kamen
- Production company: Warner Bros. Feature Animation
- Distributed by: Warner Bros.
- Release dates: July 31, 1999 (Mann's Chinese Theater); August 6, 1999 (United States)
- Running time: 87 minutes
- Country: United States
- Language: English
- Budget: $48–50 million
- Box office: $31.7 million

The Iron Giant is a 1999 American animated science fiction film directed by Brad Bird (in his feature directorial debut) and written by Tim McCanlies, from a story by Bird. Loosely based on Ted Hughes's novel The Iron Man, it features an ensemble cast consisting of Jennifer Aniston, Harry Connick Jr., Vin Diesel, James Gammon, Cloris Leachman, John Mahoney, Eli Marienthal, Christopher McDonald and M. Emmet Walsh. Set during the Cold War in 1957, the film centers on a young boy named Hogarth Hughes, who discovers and befriends a giant robot of extraterrestrial origin. With the help of beatnik artist Dean McCoppin, Hogarth attempts to prevent the United States military from finding and vanquishing the Giant.

The film was initially conceived in 1994 as a musical with the involvement of Pete Townshend of the Who. In 1996, Bird signed on as director and McCanlies was hired to write the screenplay. The film was animated primarily using traditional animation, with computer-generated imagery used to animate the titular character and for other effects. The crew of the film was understaffed and completed it with half of the time and budget of other animated features. Michael Kamen composed the film's score, which was performed by the Czech Philharmonic.

The Iron Giant premiered at Mann's Chinese Theater in Los Angeles on July 31, 1999, and was released in the United States by Warner Bros. on August 6. Although the film was met with critical acclaim upon release, it was a box-office failure, grossing $31.7 million against a production budget of $50 million. Its poor performance was attributed to a lack of marketing and Warner Bros.' skepticism towards animated films following the failure of Quest for Camelot the preceding year. The Iron Giant was nominated for several awards, winning nine Annie Awards out of 15 nominations. Through home video releases and television syndication, the film garnered a cult following and is widely regarded as a modern animated classic and one of the greatest animated films of all time. In 2015, an extended and remastered version of the film was re-released theatrically.

== Plot ==
In 1957, during the Cold War, a gigantic extraterrestrial robot crash-lands off the coast of Rockwell, Maine. The following night, nine-year-old Hogarth Hughes investigates reports of power outages and discovers the Giant feeding on electrical lines at a substation. Though initially frightened, Hogarth later returns to save the Giant from electrocution.

Hogarth befriends the Giant, discovering him to be gentle, curious and childlike. The Giant eats railroad tracks, oblivious to an oncoming train which collides with and damages him. The Giant's scattered pieces automatically return to him, allowing him to self-repair. Hogarth shelters the Giant at his home and shows him his comic books, explaining the difference between heroes and weapons and comparing him to Superman.

Incidents related to the Giant attract the attention of the paranoid federal agent Kent Mansley, who arrives in Rockwell to investigate. While initially skeptical, Mansley eventually believes in the Giant's existence and views him as a national threat. Suspecting Hogarth knows more than he admits, Mansley rents a room in the home of Hogarth and his widowed mother Annie to watch him. To keep the Giant safe and well-fed, Hogarth brings him to a wrecking yard owned by beatnik artist Dean McCoppin, who reluctantly agrees to hide him. When Hogarth and the Giant witness hunters killing a deer, Hogarth explains death to the Giant, which unsettles him.

After discovering a photograph proving Hogarth's connection to the Giant, Mansley interrogates him, then summons U.S. Army General Shannon Rogard and soldiers to the scrapyard. Forewarned, Dean disguises the Giant as a sculpture to deceive the soldiers into leaving. Later, when Hogarth playfully points a water gun at the Giant, he instinctively activates one of his defensive systems. Horrified that he could be lethal, the Giant flees toward the town in shame. Dean realizes the Giant can only attack in self-defense, and he and Hogarth pursue him.

In Rockwell, the Giant rescues a pair of boys falling from a building, briefly winning the support of the townspeople as he reunites with Hogarth. Mansley spots him and urges Rogard to attack. In the ensuing confrontation, Hogarth is rendered unconscious and the Giant, believing Hogarth has died, enters a heavily-armed battle mode and retaliates against the soldiers. When conventional weapons fail, Mansley persuades Rogard to launch a nuclear missile from the USS Nautilus.

Hogarth regains consciousness and subdues the Giant by reminding him that he can choose who he wants to be. Dean convinces Rogard to stand down, but an enraged Mansley impulsively orders the missile launch before realizing the missile is targeted towards Rockwell, and will destroy the town and its inhabitants. Mansley attempts to flee, but is stopped by the Giant and promptly secured. Determined to save the town, the Giant bids farewell to Hogarth and flies upward to intercept the missile. The Giant collides with it high above Earth and harmlessly detonates it in the exosphere, apparently sacrificing himself.

Months later, Annie and Dean admire Dean's memorial statue of the Giant in the town park. Hogarth receives a package from Rogard containing a single screw recovered from the Giant, the sole remnant found following the Giant's sacrifice. That night, the screw starts moving; Hogarth remembers the Giant's ability to reassemble himself and happily allows it to roll out of his bedroom window. Far away on the Langjökull glacier in Iceland, the Giant's head smiles as his scattered parts converge for his reassembly.

== Voice cast ==
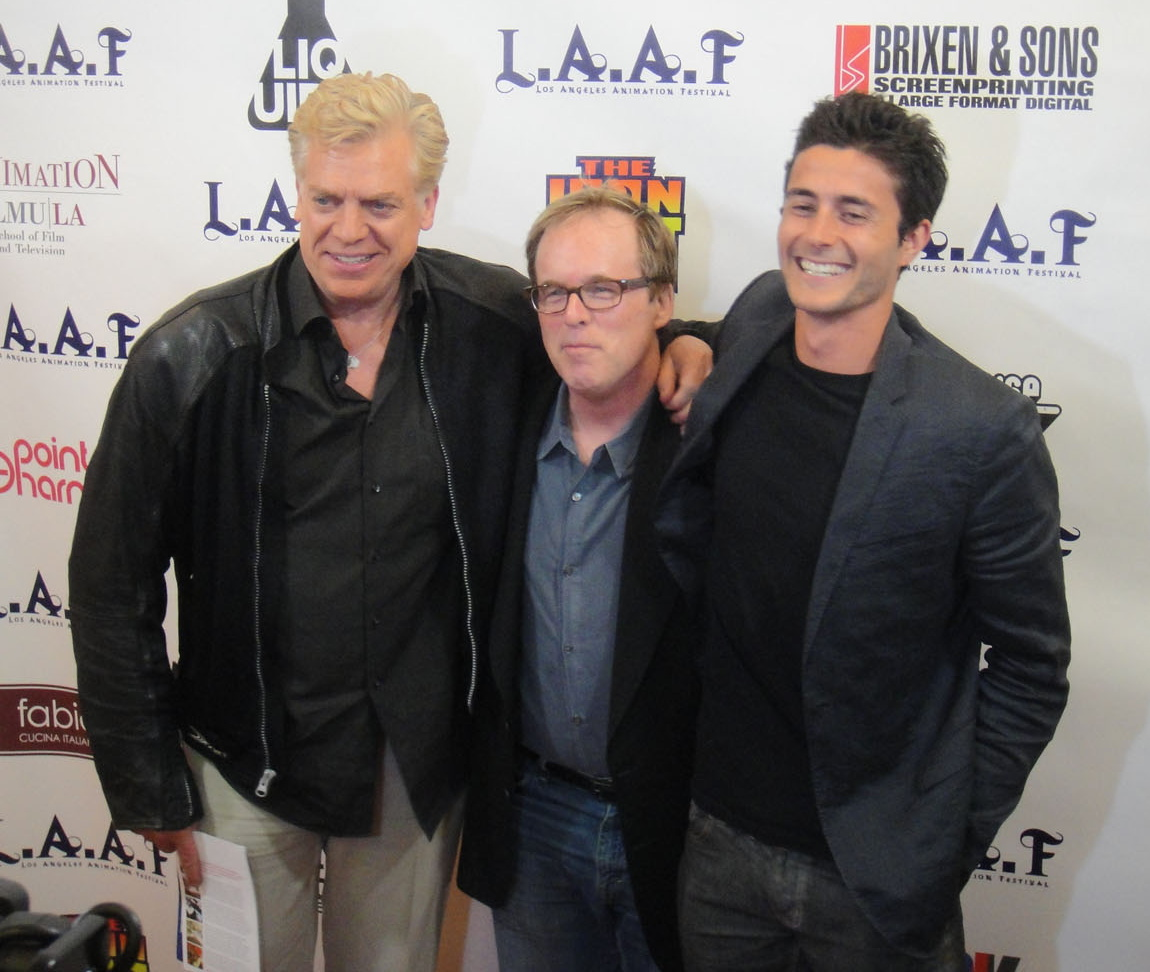
Christopher McDonald, Brad Bird and Eli Marienthal in March 2012 at the Iron Giant screening at the LA Animation Festival

- Vin Diesel as The Iron Giant: A fifty-foot tall, metal-eating robot of extraterrestrial origin designed as a war machine. The Giant's voice was originally going to be electronically modulated, but the filmmakers decided they "needed a deep, resonant and expressive voice to start with", so they hired Diesel.
- Eli Marienthal as Hogarth Hughes: A nine-year-old boy with an active imagination. Marienthal's performances were videotaped and given to animators to work with, which helped them develop expressions for the character. Hogarth was named after Ted Hughes, the author of the film's source material, and the artist Burne Hogarth.
- Jennifer Aniston as Annie Hughes: Hogarth's widowed mother, who is a waitress at a diner. According to Bird, Aniston was the only casting suggestion made by Warner Bros. executives that Bird liked and approved.
- Harry Connick Jr. as Dean McCoppin: A beatnik artist who owns a wrecking yard. Bird felt it appropriate to make the character a member of the Beat Generation, as they were viewed as mildly threatening to small-town values during that time. As Dean is an outsider himself, he is among the first to recognize that the Giant is not a threat.
- Christopher McDonald as Kent Mansley: A paranoid and short-tempered federal agent sent to investigate sightings of the Giant.
- John Mahoney as General Shannon Rogard: A U.S. Army general.
- M. Emmet Walsh as Earl Stutz: A sailor who is the first-known human to encounter the Giant.
- James Gammon as:
  - Foreman Marv Loach: A substation employee who follows the Giant's trail after he takes the station apart for sustenance.
  - Floyd Turbeaux, a farmer and friend of Stutz.
- Cloris Leachman as Lynley Tensedge: Hogarth's fourth grade teacher.
- Frank Welker as the vocal effects of a squirrel that Hogarth wanted to keep as a pet, as well as a deer killed by hunters.
- Ollie Johnston and Frank Thomas as Ollie and Frank, train engineers briefly seen near the start of the film. Johnston and Thomas, who were animators and members of Disney's Nine Old Men, were cited by Bird as inspirations for his career; he honored them by including their voices, likenesses and first names in the film.

== Production ==
=== Development ===
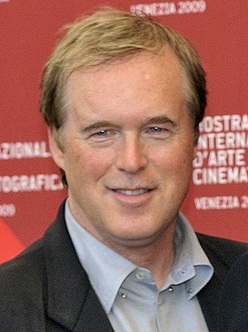
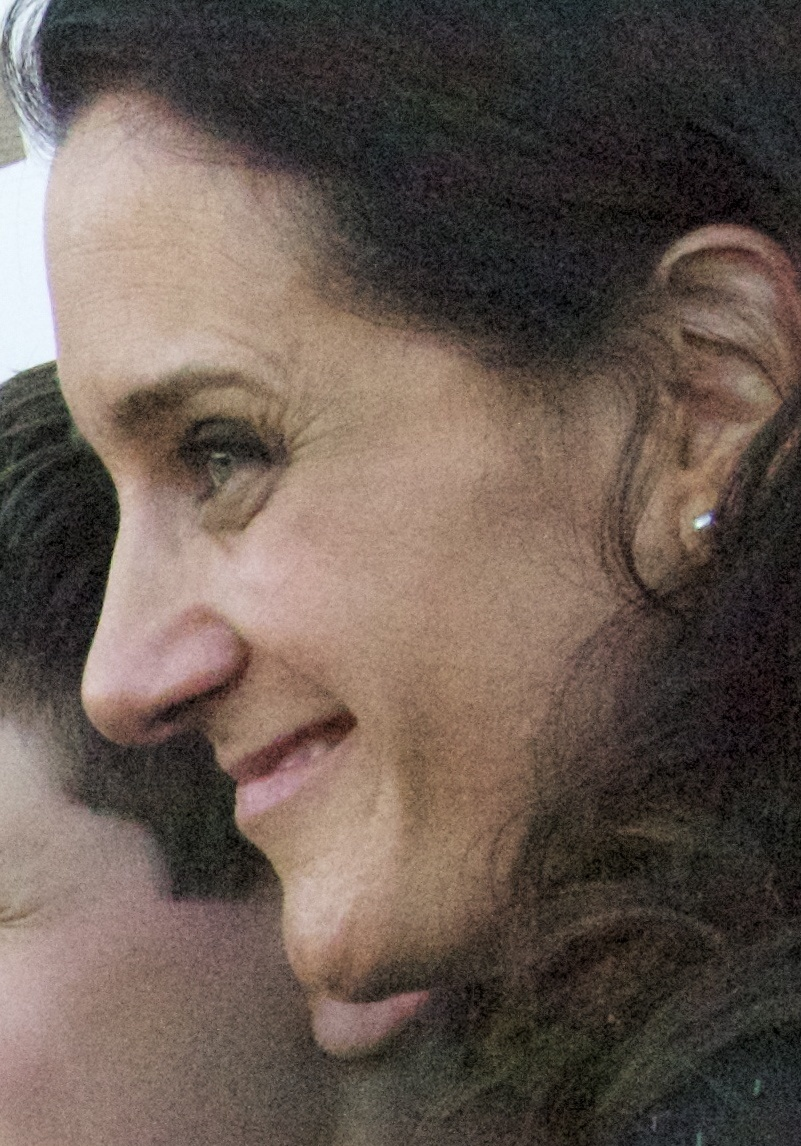
Director and screenwriter Brad Bird (left) and producer Allison Abbate

The origins of the film lie in the novel The Iron Man (1968), by poet Ted Hughes, who wrote it for his children to comfort them in the wake of their mother Sylvia Plath's suicide. In the 1980s, rock musician Pete Townshend chose to adapt the book for a concept album; it was released as The Iron Man: A Musical in 1989. In 1991, Richard Bazley, who later became the film's lead animator, pitched a version of The Iron Man to Don Bluth while working at Bluth's studio in Ireland. He created a story outline and character designs but Bluth passed on the project. After a stage musical was mounted in London, Des McAnuff, who had adapted Tommy for the stage with Townshend, believed that The Iron Man could translate to the screen, and the project was ultimately acquired by Warner Bros. Pictures.

During development of the project in late 1996, the studio saw it as a perfect vehicle for Brad Bird, who was working on Ray Gunn for Turner Feature Animation. Turner Broadcasting had recently merged with Warner Bros. parent company Time Warner, and Bird was allowed to transfer to the Warner Bros. Animation studio to direct The Iron Giant. After reading Hughes's novel, Bird was impressed with the mythology of the story. He was given an unusual amount of creative control by the studio, which allowed him to set the film in the United States and create the characters Dean and Kent, which were not in the book. Bird explained that he wanted to set the film in 1950s America because society was about to "boil over" with fear of the Russians, atomic bombs and even rock and roll. He felt this context of pervasive fear was "the perfect environment to drop a 50-foot-tall robot into." Bird discarded Townshend's idea for the film to be a musical, although Townshend stayed on as the film's executive producer. (Note: Attributed to multiple references:) Ted Hughes died before the film's release, but his daughter, Frieda Hughes, saw the film on his behalf and loved it.

=== Writing ===
Tim McCanlies was hired to write the script, which displeased Bird somewhat, as he wanted to write it himself. Bird changed his mind after reading McCanlies's then-unproduced screenplay for Secondhand Lions. In Bird's original story treatment, America and the USSR were at war at the end, with the Giant dying. McCanlies decided to have a brief scene displaying his survival, stating, "You can't kill E.T. and then not bring him back." McCanlies was given three months to complete the script, and finished it in two. McCanlies said the tight deadline benefited the script in some ways, since Warner Bros. did not have time to make changes. The Giant's backstory was purposefully left out to keep the story focused on his relationship with Hogarth. Ted Hughes was sent a copy of McCanlies's script and wrote a letter back, saying how much he enjoyed it. He called the story a "terrific dramatic situation" and described the ending as "a glorious piece of amazement."

Bird said his experience working in television prepared him to direct The Iron Giant, which was his first feature film. He said working on the animated series Family Dog taught him the importance of team-building, while his tenure on The Simpsons gave him experience working under strict deadlines. He was open to ideas from other crew members, often asking for opinions on scenes and then making adjustments accordingly. Bird felt that modern filmmaking overly emphasized loud, frenetic scenes, and he therefore prioritized softer, character-based moments in The Iron Giant. Storyboard artist Teddy Newton played a role in shaping the story and the screenplay of the film. He created a social guidance film (based on the 1952 film "Duck and Cover") which can be seen in The Iron Giant.

=== Animation ===
The financial failure of Warner Bros.' previous animated film, Quest for Camelot, significantly influenced the production of The Iron Giant. By the time the film entered production, Warner Bros. informed the staff that there would be a smaller budget and time-frame to get the film completed. Although the production was watched closely, Bird commented, "They did leave us alone if we kept it in control and showed them we were producing the film responsibly and getting it done on time". Bird said his team had "one-third of the money of a Disney or DreamWorks film, and half of the production schedule" but the payoff as having more creative freedom, describing the film as "fully-made by the animation team; I don't think any other studio can say that to the level that we can." A small part of the team took a weeklong research trip to Maine, where they photographed and videotaped five small cities. They hoped to accurately reflect its culture down to the minutiae; "we shot store fronts, barns, forests, homes, home interiors, diners, every detail we could, including the bark on trees", said production designer Mark Whiting.

Bird stuck to elaborate scene planning, such as detailed animatics, to make sure there were no budgetary concerns. The team initially worked with Macromedia's Director software, before switching to Adobe After Effects full-time. Bird was eager to use the then-nascent software, as it allowed for storyboard to contain indications of camera moves. The software became essential to that team—dubbed "Macro" early on—to help the studio grasp story reels for the film. These also allowed Bird to better understand what the film required from an editing perspective. In the end, he was proud of the way the film was developed, noting that "We could imagine the pace and the unfolding of our film accurately with a relatively small expenditure of resources." The group would gather in a screening room to view completed sequences, with Bird offering suggestions by drawing onto the screen with a marker. Lead animator Bazley suggested this led to a sense of camaraderie among the crew, who were unified in their mission to create a good film. Bird cited his favorite moment of the film's production as occurring in the editing room, when the crew gathered to test a sequence in which the Giant learns what a soul is. "People in the room were spontaneously crying. It was pivotal; there was an undeniable feeling that we were really tapping into something," he recalled.

He opted to give the film's animators portions to animate entirely, rather than the standard process of animating one character, in a throwback to the way Disney's first features were created. The exception were those responsible for creating the Giant himself, who was created using computer-generated imagery due to the difficulty of creating a metal object "in a fluid-like manner". They had additional trouble with using the computer model to express emotion. The Giant consisted of 7,000 parts (the Battle Giant had 10,000 parts), and was designed by filmmaker Joe Johnston and refined by production designer Mark Whiting and Steve Markowski, head animator for the Giant. Using software, the team would animate the Giant "on twos" (every other frame, or twelve frames per second) when interacting with other characters, to make it less obvious it was a computer model. Bird brought in students from CalArts to assist in minor animation work due to the film's busy schedule. He made sure to spread out the work on scenes between experienced and younger animators, noting, "You overburden your strongest people and underburden the others [if you let your top talent monopolize the best assignments]." Hiroki Itokazu designed all of the film's CGI props and vehicles, which were created in a variety of software, including Alias Systems Corporation's Maya, Alias' PowerAnimator, a modified version of Pixar's RenderMan, Softimage 3D, Cambridge Animation's Animo (now part of Toon Boom Technologies), Avid Elastic Reality, and Adobe Photoshop.

The art of Norman Rockwell, Edward Hopper, and N.C. Wyeth inspired the film's design. Whiting used colors that evoked the time period in which the film is set, and expressed its emotional tone; for example, Hogarth's room was designed to reflect his "youth and sense of wonder". Animators studied Chuck Jones, Hank Ketcham, Al Hirschfeld and Disney films from that era, such as 101 Dalmatians, for inspiration in the film's animation.

=== Music ===
The score for the film was composed and conducted by Michael Kamen, making it Bird's only film not scored by his future collaborator, Michael Giacchino. Bird's original temporary score, "a collection of Bernard Herrmann cues from '50s and '60s sci-fi films," initially scared Kamen. Believing the sound of the orchestra is important to the feeling of the film, Kamen "decided to comb eastern Europe for an "old-fashioned" sounding orchestra and went to Prague to hear Vladimir Ashkenazy conduct the Czech Philharmonic in Strauss' An Alpine Symphony." Eventually, the Czech Philharmonic was the orchestra used for the film's score, with Bird describing the symphony orchestra as "an amazing collection of musicians". The score for The Iron Giant was recorded in a rather unconventional manner, compared to most films: recorded over one week at the Rudolfinum in Prague, the music was recorded without conventional uses of syncing the music, in a method Kamen described in a 1999 interview as "[being able to] play the music as if it were a piece of classical repertoire." Kamen's score for The Iron Giant won the Annie Award for Music in an Animated Feature Production on November 6, 1999.

=== Post-production ===
Bird opted to produce The Iron Giant in widescreen—specifically the wide 2.39:1 CinemaScope aspect ratio—but was warned against doing so by his advisers. He felt it was appropriate to use the format, as many films from the late 1950s were produced in such widescreen formats. He hoped to include the CinemaScope logo on a poster, partially as a joke, but 20th Century Fox, owner of the trademark, refused.

Bird later recalled that he clashed with executives who wished to add characters, such as a sidekick dog, set the film in the present day, and include a soundtrack of hip hop. This was due to concerns that the film was not merchandisable, to which Bird responded, "If they were interested in telling the story, they should let it be what it wants to be." The film was also initially going to be released under the Warner Bros. Family Entertainment banner, the logo which featured mascot Bugs Bunny in a tuxedo and eating a carrot, as seen in the film's teaser trailer. Bird was against this for a multitude of reasons, mainly because he felt that the logo did not fit the tone of the movie, and eventually got confirmation that executives Bob Daley and Terry Semel agreed. Instead, Bird and his team developed another version of the logo to resemble the classic studio logo in a circle, famously employed in Looney Tunes shorts. He credited executives Lorenzo di Bonaventura and Courtney Vallenti with helping him achieve his vision, noting that they were open to his opinion.

According to a report from the time of its release, The Iron Giant cost $50 million to produce with an additional $30 million going towards marketing, though Box Office Mojo later reported its budget as $70 million. It was regarded as a lower-budget film, in comparison to the films distributed by Walt Disney Pictures.

== Themes ==
When he began work on the film, Bird was in the midst of coping with the death of his sister, Susan, who was shot and killed by her estranged husband. In researching its source material, he learned that Hughes wrote The Iron Man as a means of comforting his children after his wife, Sylvia Plath, died by suicide, specifically through the metaphor of the title character being able to re-assemble itself after being damaged. These experiences formed the basis of Bird's pitch to Warner Bros., which was based around the idea "What if a gun had a soul, and didn't want to be a gun?"; the completed film was also dedicated to Hughes and Susan. McCanlies commented that "at a certain point, there are deciding moments when we pick who we want to be. And that plays out for the rest of your life", adding that films can provide viewers with a sense of right and wrong, and expressed a wish that The Iron Giant would "make us feel like we're all part of humanity [which] is something we need to feel." When some critics compared the film to E.T. the Extra-Terrestrial (1982), Bird responded by saying "E.T. doesn't go kicking ass. He doesn't make the Army pay. Certainly you risk having your hip credentials taken away if you want to evoke anything sad or genuinely heartfelt."

== Release ==
=== Theatrical ===
The Iron Giant opened at Mann's Chinese Theater in Los Angeles on July 31, 1999. A ceremony preceded the screening, during which a concrete slab bearing the Giant's footprint was commemorated. The film opened in Los Angeles and New York City on August 4, 1999, with a wider national release occurring on August 6 in the United States.

=== Marketing ===
The Iron Giant was a commercial failure during its theatrical release; consensus among critics was that its failure was, in part, due to lack of promotion from Warner Bros. This was largely attributable to the reception of Quest for Camelot; after its release, Warner would not give Bird and his team a release date for their film until April 1999. After wildly successful test screenings, the studio was shocked by the response: the test scores were their highest for a film in 15 years, according to Bird. They had neglected to prepare a successful marketing strategy for the film—such as cereal and fast food tie-ins—with little time left before its scheduled release. Bird recalled that the studio produced only one poster for the film. Brad Ball, who had been assigned the role of marketing the film, was candid after its release, noting that the studio did not commit to a planned Burger King toy plan. IGN stated that "In a mis-marketing campaign of epic proportions at the hands of Warner Bros., they simply didn't realize what they had on their hands."

The studio needed an $8 million opening to ensure success, but they were unable to properly promote it preceding the release. They nearly delayed the film by several months to better prepare. "They said, 'we should delay it and properly lead up to its release,' and I said 'you guys have had two and a half years to get ready for this,'" recalled Bird. Press outlets took note of its absence of marketing, with some reporting that the studio had spent more money on marketing for the intended summer blockbuster Wild Wild West instead. Warner Bros. scheduled Sunday sneak preview screenings for the film prior to its release, as well as a preview of the film on the online platform Webcastsneak.

=== Home media and television syndication ===
After criticism that it mounted an ineffective marketing campaign for its theatrical release, Warner Bros. revamped its advertising strategy for the video release of the film, including tie-ins with Honey Nut Cheerios, AOL and General Motors and secured the backing of three U.S. congressmen (Ed Markey, Mark Foley and Howard Berman). Awareness of the film was increased by its February 2000 release as a pay-per-view title, which also increased traffic to the film's website.

The Iron Giant was released on VHS and DVD on November 23, 1999, with a Laserdisc release following on December 6. Warner Bros. spent $35 million to market the home video release of the film. The VHS edition came in three versions—pan and scan, pan and scan with an affixed Giant toy to the clamshell case, and a widescreen version. In 2000, television rights to the film were sold to Cartoon Network and TNT for $3 million. Cartoon Network showed the film continuously for 24 consecutive hours in the early 2000s for such holidays as the Fourth of July and Thanksgiving and on the channel's Toonami block.

The Special Edition DVD was released on November 16, 2004. In 2014, Bird entered discussions with Warner Bros. regarding the possibility of releasing The Iron Giant on Blu-ray. On April 23, he wrote on Twitter that "WB & I have been talking. But they want a bare-bones disc. I want better," and encouraged fans to send tweets to Warner Home Video in favor of a Special Edition Blu-ray of the film. The film was ultimately released on Blu-ray on September 6, 2016, and included both the theatrical and 2015 Signature Edition cuts, as well as a documentary entitled The Giant's Dream that covered the making of the film. This version also received a DVD release months earlier on February 16 with The Giant's Dream documentary removed.

=== Signature Edition ===
A remastered and extended cut of the film, called the Signature Edition, was shown in one-off screenings across the United States and Canada on September 30, 2015, and October 4, 2015. The edition is approximately two minutes longer than the original cut, and features a brief scene with Annie and Dean in the cafe and the Giant's dream sequence. Both scenes were storyboarded by Bird during the production on the original film, but could not be finished due to time and budget constraints. Before they were fully completed for this new version, they were presented as deleted storyboard sequences on the 2004 DVD bonus features. They were animated in 2015 by Duncan Studio, which employed several animators that worked on the original film, under Bird's supervision. The film's Signature Edition was released on DVD and for digital download on February 16, 2016, with a Blu-ray release following on September 6.

On March 14, 2016, coinciding with the release of the Signature Edition, it was announced that The Art of the Iron Giant would be written by Ramin Zahed and published by Insight Editions, featuring concept art and other materials from the film.

== Reception ==
=== Box office ===
The Iron Giant opened in 2,179 theaters in the U.S., ranking at number nine at the box office accumulating $5.7 million over its opening weekend. It was quick to drop out of the top ten; by its fourth week, it had accumulated only $18.9 million—far under its reported $50 million budget. According to Dave McNary of the Los Angeles Daily News, "Its weekend per-theater average was only $2,631, an average of $145 or perhaps 30 tickets per showing"—leading theater owners to quickly discard the film. At the time, Warner Bros. was shaken by the resignations of executives Bob Daly and Terry Semel, making the failure much worse. T.L. Stanley of Brandweek cited it as an example of how media tie-ins were now essential to guaranteeing a film's success.

The film went on to gross $23.2 million domestically and $8.1 million internationally for a total of $31.3 million worldwide. Analysts deemed it a victim of poor timing and "a severe miscalculation of how to attract an audience." Lorenzo di Bonaventura, president of Warner Bros. at the time, explained, "People always say to me, 'Why don't you make smarter family movies?' The lesson is, Every time you do, you get slaughtered."

=== Critical response ===
The Iron Giant received critical acclaim. On the review aggregator Rotten Tomatoes, it has a 96% approval rating based on 144 reviews, with an average rating of 8.50/10. The website's critical consensus reads: "The endearing Iron Giant tackles ambitious topics and complex human relationships with a steady hand and beautifully animated direction from Brad Bird." Metacritic, which uses a weighted average, assigns the film a score of 85 out of 100 based on 29 critics. Audiences polled by CinemaScore gave the film an average grade of "A" on an A+ to F scale. The Reel Source forecasting service calculated that "96–97%" of audiences that attended recommended the film.

Kenneth Turan of the Los Angeles Times called the film "straight-arrow and subversive, [and] made with simplicity as well as sophistication ... it feels like a classic even though it's just out of the box." Roger Ebert of the Chicago Sun-Times called The Iron Giant to "not just a cute romp but an involving story that has something to say", and compared it to the films of Hayao Miyazaki. Michael Sragow of The New Yorker dubbed it a "modern fairy tale" with the "power to open up a viewer's heart and mind." Time's Richard Schickel deemed the film "a smart live-and-let-live parable" full of observations on life, death, and the military-industrial complex. Writing for The New York Times, Lawrence Van Gelder called it a "smooth, skilled example of animated filmmaking." Joe Morgenstern of The Wall Street Journal described it as a beautiful, "deliciously funny and deeply affecting" work of art.

David Hunter of The Hollywood Reporter predicted The Iron Giant to be a sleeper hit and called it "outstanding", while Lael Loewenstein of Variety called it "a visually appealing, well-crafted film [...] an unalloyed success." Bruce Fretts of Entertainment Weekly commented, "I have long thought that I was born without the gene that would allow me to be emotionally drawn in by drawings. That is, until I saw The Iron Giant." Peter Stack of the San Francisco Chronicle thought the storytelling was far superior to other animated films, and said it contained a richness of moral themes. Jeff Millar of the Houston Chronicle agreed with the basic techniques as well, and concluded the voice cast excelled with a great script by Tim McCanlies. The Washington Post's Stephen Hunter described the film as "beautifully drawn" and "sleek and engaging" but felt it has "the annoyance of incredible smugness."

=== Accolades ===
The Hugo Awards nominated The Iron Giant for Best Dramatic Presentation, while the Science Fiction and Fantasy Writers of America honored Brad Bird and Tim McCanlies with the Nebula Award nomination. The British Academy of Film and Television Arts gave the film a Children's Award as Best Feature Film. In addition The Iron Giant won nine Annie Awards out of fifteen nominations, winning every category it was nominated for, with another nomination for Best Home Video Release at The Saturn Awards. IGN ranked The Iron Giant as the fifth favorite animated film of all time in a list published in 2010. In 2008, the American Film Institute nominated The Iron Giant for its Top 10 Animated Films list.

Awards
Award	Date of ceremony	Category	Recipients	Result
Annie Awards	November 6, 1999	Best Animated Feature Film	Allison Abbate, Des McAnuff, and John Walker; Warner Bros. Pictures; Warner Bros. Feature Animation	Won
Annie Awards	November 6, 1999	Outstanding Individual Achievement in Effects Animation	Allen Foster	Won
Annie Awards	November 6, 1999	Outstanding Individual Achievement in Effects Animation	Michel Gagné	Nominated
Annie Awards	November 6, 1999	Outstanding Individual Achievement in Character Animation	Jim Van der Keyl	Nominated
Annie Awards	November 6, 1999	Outstanding Individual Achievement in Character Animation	Steve Markowski	Won
Annie Awards	November 6, 1999	Outstanding Individual Achievement in Character Animation	Dean Wellins	Nominated
Annie Awards	November 6, 1999	Outstanding Individual Achievement for Directing in an Animated Feature Production	Brad Bird	Won
Annie Awards	November 6, 1999	Outstanding Individual Achievement for Music in an Animated Feature Production	Michael Kamen	Won
Annie Awards	November 6, 1999	Outstanding Individual Achievement for Production Design in an Animated Feature Production	Alan Bodner	Won
Annie Awards	November 6, 1999	Outstanding Individual Achievement for Production Design in an Animated Feature Production	Mark Whiting	Nominated
Annie Awards	November 6, 1999	Outstanding Individual Achievement in Storyboarding in an Animated Feature Production	Mark Andrews	Won
Annie Awards	November 6, 1999	Outstanding Individual Achievement in Storyboarding in an Animated Feature Production	Kevin O'Brien	Nominated
Annie Awards	November 6, 1999	Outstanding Individual Achievement in Storyboarding in an Animated Feature Production	Dean Wellins	Nominated
Annie Awards	November 6, 1999	Outstanding Individual Achievement for Voice Acting in an Animated Feature Production	Eli Marienthal; For playing "Hogarth Hughes".	Won
Annie Awards	November 6, 1999	Outstanding Individual Achievement for Writing in an Animated Feature Production	Tim McCanlies (screenplay) and Brad Bird (story)	Won
BAFTA Children's Award	November 12, 2000	Best Feature Film	Brad Bird, Allison Abbate, Des McAnuff, and Tim McCanlies	Won
Florida Film Critics Circle	January 9, 2000	Best Animated Film	Brad Bird	Won
Genesis Awards	March 18, 2000	Best Feature Film – Animated		Won
Hugo Award	September 2, 2000	Best Dramatic Presentation	Brad Bird (screen story and directed by), Tim McCanlies (screenplay by), and Ted Hughes (based on the book The Iron Man by)	Nominated
Las Vegas Film Critics Society	January 18, 2000	Best Animated Film		Won
Los Angeles Film Critics Association	January 20, 2000	Best Animated Film	Brad Bird	Won
Motion Picture Sound Editors Awards	March 25, 2000	Best Sound Editing – Animated Feature		Won
Motion Picture Sound Editors Awards	March 25, 2000	Best Sound Editing – Music – Animation		Nominated
New York Film Critics Circle	January 10, 2000	Best Animated Film		2nd place
Santa Fe Film Critics Circle Awards	January 9, 2000	Best Animated Film		Won
Saturn Awards	June 6, 2000	Best Home Video Release		Nominated
Science Fiction and Fantasy Writers of America	May 20, 2000	Best Script	Brad Bird and Tim McCanlies	Nominated
Young Artist Awards	March 19, 2000	Best Family Feature Film – Animated		Nominated
Young Artist Awards	March 19, 2000	Best Performance in a Voice-Over (TV or Feature Film) – Young Actor	Eli Marienthal	Won

== Legacy ==
The Cartoon Network series Mad did a parody of the film as well as the film The Iron Lady for their Season 3 premiere entitled The Iron Giant Lady. In the sketch, British prime minister Margaret Thatcher is the Giant and inspires other gynoids to take positions of political power.

The designers of the 2015 video game Ori and the Blind Forest were guided by inspirations from the film, alongside Disney's The Lion King.

The Iron Giant appears in Steven Spielberg's 2018 science fiction film Ready Player One. Aech had collected the parts of the Iron Giant, which she later controls during the film's climax to oppose Mechagodzilla, aided by Gundam. After the Giant sacrifices itself and sinks into a river of lava, it gives a thumbs up to the heroes while sinking in a direct homage to the T-800’s sacrifice at the end of Terminator 2: Judgment Day.

Alberto "Beto" Tlahuetl, director of the Mexican cumbia band "Grupo Soñador", stated that he was inspired by the film to write the song "El Paso del Gigante" (initially called "El Gigante de Hierro", i.e. The Iron Giant) after dreaming of the Giant dancing in the streets of Los Angeles. The lyrics emphasize the theme of never giving up on a daughter's love by being her biggest protector.

== See also ==
- United States in the 1950s
- The Beat Generation

== Bibliography ==
- Hughes, Ted (March 3, 2005). The Iron Man (Paperback). Faber Children's Books. ISBN 0571226124.
- Hughes, Ted; Moser, Barry (August 31, 1995). The Iron Woman (Hardcover). Amazon Remainders Account. ISBN 0803717962.
- James Preller The Iron Giant: A Novelization. Scholastic Paperbacks (August 1999). ISBN 0439086345.
