= Digital Domain =

American visual effects and computer animation company

- Type: Private
- Industry: Motion picture
- Founded: 1993; 33 years ago
- Founders: James Cameron; Scott Ross; Stan Winston
- Headquarters: Culver City, California, United States
- Services: Visual effects; Animation; Virtual actor
- Owner: Digital Domain Holdings Limited
- Website: digitaldomain.com

Digital Domain (also known as Digital Domain Media Group or DDMG) is an American visual effects, computer animation and digital production company headquartered in Culver City, California.

Digital Domain has produced visual effects and animation for more than 500 films, including Dante's Peak, Titanic, Apollo 13, What Dreams May Come, The Fifth Element, Armageddon, Star Trek: Nemesis and The Day After Tomorrow.

The company is known for creating digital imagery for feature films, episodics, advertising and games, and virtual and immersive experiences from its nine locations across North America and Asia in Los Angeles, Vancouver, Montreal, Hyderabad, Luxembourg, Beijing, Shanghai, Shenzhen, and Hong Kong.

== History ==
The company was founded by film director James Cameron, Stan Winston and Scott Ross in 1993. Ross, the former Senior Vice President of LucasArts Entertainment Company had spent several years working for George Lucas, but had grown frustrated that his boss was focusing on theme parks, video games and real estate after the failures of Howard The Duck (1986) and Willow (1988). "I left because I wanted to make movies," he acknowledged. Winston had his own explanation for launching the new company, stating, "There's a reason why I now own Digital Domain with Jim Cameron and Scott Ross, the second largest computer effects company next to ILM. I don't want to become extinct like the dinosaurs in Jurassic Park".

On February 22, 1993, it was announced that IBM Corporation and Cameron’s Lightstorm Entertainment were finalizing a deal to launch Digital Domain with Cameron as chairman. Ross will serve as president and chief operating officer. The studio would be based at Lightstorm’s Santa Monica facility, the four-building complex formerly occupied by the ad agency Chiat/Day, and was expected to handle visual effects for Cameron's upcoming slate of films under his five-year, 12-picture deal with 20th Century Fox, which potentially includes a live-action Spider-Man film. Engineered by IBM’s multimedia VP Lucie Fjeldstad, the partnership will outfit Digital Domain with IBM’s latest high-speed hardware, such as the Power Visualization System (PVS). IBM's new investment unit, Fireworks Partners, may seek licenses for the new software developed for Cameron's films, aligning with IBM's broader push into digital production and delivering movies over fiber optic networks to homes.

IBM holds a 50% equity stake, while the remaining 50% was split evenly among Cameron, Ross, and Winston. All three sit on the board of directors while maintaining their separate companies. Start-up costs were estimated at up to $20 million, with IBM expecting a strong return within three years. Notably, Digital Domain was not required to use IBM hardware, though IBM would use the studio as an research and development lab to develop software for other industries like medicine and construction and its own digital networks. Rival effects houses like Rhythm & Hues and Boss Films Studio acknowledged Digital Domain as an immediate major competitor. However, observers noted challenges ahead, including fierce competition from studios building in-house digital teams and whether Cameron and Winston will have enough time to advise the studio once their own film productions ramp up.

In July 1993, it was reported that Digital Domain was preparing to open its new 67,500-square-foot headquarters in Venice, Los Angeles. The company recruited heavily from IBM, rival visual effects studios, and major ad agencies to fill out its leadership team.

They began producing visual effects and animation in 1993 with its first three films, True Lies, Interview with the Vampire, and Color of Night, being released in 1994.

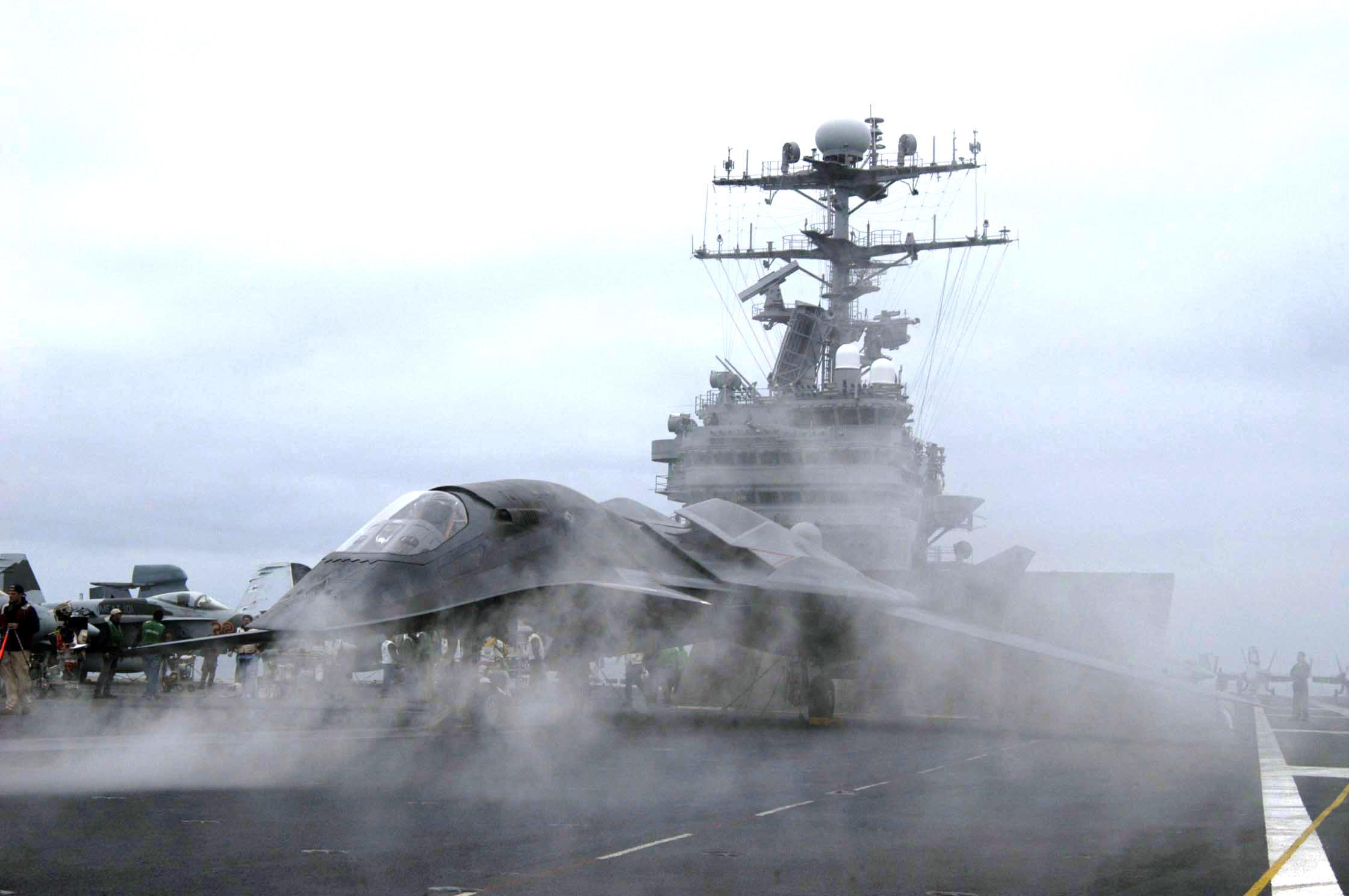
From the film Stealth: the fictional F/A-37 Talon aboard the USS Abraham Lincoln.

=== Early 2000s ===
In October 2002, Digital Domain launched a wholly owned subsidiary, D2 Software, Inc., to market and distribute its Academy Award-winning compositing software, Nuke.

In 2002–2003, Digital Domain co-produced its first feature film, Secondhand Lions, written and directed by Tim McCanlies and starring Michael Caine, Robert Duvall, Haley Joel Osment, and Kyra Sedgwick.

The founders were known for feuding, principally due to internal conflicts over the film Titanic. Founder Scott Ross announced plans to raise $100 million in financing to become more active as a production company. This plan never materialized, forcing management to seek a buyer of the company.

=== 2006–present ===
In May 2006, Digital Domain was purchased by an affiliate of Wyndcrest Holdings, LLC, a private holding company. Wyndcrest's principals then included founder John Textor, director Michael Bay, former Microsoft executive Carl Stork and former NFL player and sports television commentator Dan Marino. The buyers purchased the company for an estimated $35 million. Textor and Bay would become co-chairman of Digital Domain and Stork was named CEO.

In 2007, Wyndcrest also acquired The Foundry which was tasked with taking over the development of Nuke. The Foundry was subject to a management buy-out in 2009.

In 2011, Digital Domain Media Group entered into the film production business with a major investment into the feature film Ender's Game, which was a co-production with OddLot Entertainment and Summit Entertainment. The film was released November 1, 2013.

In November 2011, DDMG took the company public through an initial public offering (IPO), and the company was listed on the NYSE under the symbol DDMG, achieving a market valuation of more than $400 million.

In 2012, subsidiary Digital Domain created a virtual likeness of the late rap star Tupac Shakur for Dr. Dre's and Snoop Dogg's show at the Coachella Valley Music and Arts Festival. The performance earned Textor's studio the Titanium Award at the 59th annual Cannes Lions International Festival of Creativity. Digital Domain also announced that the company would go on create virtual Elvis Presley in partnership with CORE Media Group.

In 2015, the UFC hired Digital Domain to create a commercial series for their UFC 189 event.

In 2016, the Pokémon Company hired Digital Domain to create the visual effects for their "Train On" Super Bowl ad, released to celebrate the Pokémon series' 20th anniversary.

In 2017, Voltron Chronicles, a VR game Digital Domain co-developed with Universal based on Netflix's Voltron Legendary Defender, went live. Fans can play this game on PSVR, Oculus Rift and HTC Vive for $15.

In 2018, Digital Domain celebrated its 25th anniversary while announcing the opening of its second Canadian studio in Montreal, Quebec.

In 2019, Digital Domain Head of Software and virtual avatar DigiDoug presented a talk during TED2019 as the first digital human to give a TED Talk in real-time.

In 2020, Digital Domain introduced Masquerade 2.0, the next iteration of its in-house facial capture system, rebuilt from the ground up to bring feature film-quality characters to next-gen games, episodics and commercials. Masquerade 2.0 uses the same tech that was utilized to create Thanos in Avengers: Infinity War and Avengers: Endgame. The development allows the technology to be applied to smaller projects, bringing the full depth and emotion of an actor’s performance to any screen.

In 2021, Digital Domain utilized its new proprietary face-swapping tool, Charlatan, to create a realistic hologram/digital human combination of Vince Lombardi for Super Bowl LV.

In 2022, Digital Domain announced “Zoey,” an advanced autonomous virtual human. Powered by machine learning and created using an advanced version of the technology and process that helped bring Thanos to the big screen, the Zoey can engage in conversations with multiple participants at once, remember people, access the internet to answer questions and more, paving the way for the next step in the evolution of AI.

=== Digital Humans Group ===
The company has a sub-division known as New Media Group, which is currently led by Hanno Basse, the Chief Technology Officer. This sub-division provides machine learning-based scanning and digitization services to create immersive experiences for any screen. The process involves two programs called Masquerade and Direct Drive, which use high-resolution scans and motion capture technology. The data generated by these programs can be mapped and animated to create compelling visual experiences.

== Financial difficulties ==
In 2009, Digital Domain parent company DDMG launched Tradition Studios in Florida to develop and produce original, family-oriented CGI-animated features. The studio moved on January 3, 2012, to a new 115,000-square-foot (10,700 m^{2}) facility in Port St. Lucie, built with the city's incentives. The studio attracted a number of creators, including Aaron Blaise, the director of Brother Bear, and Brad Lewis, co-director of Cars 2, who together were developing an animated feature film The Legend of Tembo for a planned 2014 release.

In November 2011, DDMG completed a successful IPO capital raise for $40 million. Textor's Florida expansion plans did not overcome the continuing negative cash flow of Digital Domain's primary visual effects business. In the summer of 2011, Lydian Private Bank failed. As DDMG's principal lender and major shareholder, this had a major impact during the peak of DDMG's capital consumption. Lydian's sizable stake was sold to a hedge fund affiliated with Florida Power & Light which was then traded to hedge fund and lender Tenor Capital. Tenor Capital engaged in heavy short-selling of DDMG's publicly listed stock as a strategy to pull cash proceeds from the daily trading of DDMG stock.

Once considered critical funding for the future of DDMG, the IPO became the vehicle by which hedge funds could prevent the company from accessing capital while profiting from the decline in DDMG's stock price. Tenor became a stakeholder in DDMG in early May 2012, with DDMG stock price trading at an all-time high, but DDMG would soon be unable to access the cash needed to fund its Venice operations and its Florida studio growth. Documents and emails demonstrate that Digital Domain senior management believed they had options to put cash into the company. However, Tenor Capital had significant weight as a chief lender and, according to Palm Beach Capital and the Tenor strategy, may have been shorting DDMG stock to profit from its failure.

When a deal to fund the company failed on July 31, Tenor Capital cited a violation of a minimum cash covenant and demanded $51 million on August 20 as repayment for its $35 million loan made four months earlier. The lenders appointed Mike Katzenstein as interim chief operating officer of the company who acted without conferring with DDMG senior management, deciding to close the Florida studio, causing Chairman John Textor to submit a letter of resignation "in profound disagreement" with this decision.

On September 7, 2012, it was announced that all of DDMG's Port St. Lucie's operations—including Tradition Studios—were to be shut down, laying off nearly 300 newly trained and recruited employees.

=== Bankruptcy, financial restructuring, and lawsuits ===
On September 11, 2012, Digital Domain Media Group Inc. filed for Chapter 11 bankruptcy protection after the company's hedge fund lenders alleged the company defaulted on a minimum cash covenant relating to a $35 million loan. DDMG's lenders proposed a deal to sell its operating businesses–Digital Domain and Mothership—to a private investment firm, Searchlight Capital Partners, for $15 million. At the public auction on September 21, 2012, Digital Domain's visual effects business and its principal animation feature film properties were instead acquired by a joint venture led by a leading DDMG shareholder Beijing Galloping Horse America, LLC in partnership with Reliance MediaWorks (USA) The sale was approved on September 24, 2012.

In July 2013, approximately nine months after Digital Domain filed for bankruptcy, the majority ownership was acquired by Hong Kong listed public company Sun Innovation. This acquisition placed an approximate $3.5 billion valuation on Digital Domain, with Reliance MediaWorks continuing to own the minority stake. Daniel Seah was appointed CEO. Seah spearheaded the bankruptcy acquisition and protection of Digital Domain by DDMG shareholder Beijing Galloping Horse America, LLC.

The bankruptcy and financial restructuring of Digital Domain triggered a number of lawsuits naming John Textor, former Apple CEO John Sculley and the entire Board of Directors, the auditors and others involved in the business and in the IPO offering.

In February 2015, the Supreme Court of New York and the Inspector General of the State of Florida cleared Textor of any financial wrongdoing, and The Athletic reported that he had received a settlement from the hedge fund that caused the collapse.

Palm Beach Capital, the largest investor in DDMG, identified hedge funds, Tenor Capital et al., as the primary cause of the company's difficulties. Palm Beach Capital cited unlawful finance penalties and possible illegal short selling strategies designed to damage the company's public stock price. Ultimately, the hedge fund lenders agreed to settle outstanding claims by the DDMG parties through a May 2016 settlement agreement awarding $8.5 million to former CEO John Textor and $3 million each to the city of Port Saint Lucie and the state of Florida. The settlement also assigned all technology assets of Digital Domain's Florida studio.

== Filmography ==
=== 1990s ===
Year	Films	Director(s)	Studio(s) and distributor(s)	Budget	Gross
1994	Color of Night	Richard Rush	Hollywood Pictures	$40 million	$46.7 million
1994	True Lies	James Cameron	20th Century Fox; Lightstorm Entertainment	$100–120 million	$378.9 million
1994	Interview with the Vampire	Neil Jordan	Warner Bros. Pictures	$60 million	$223.7 million
1995	Apollo 13	Ron Howard	Universal Pictures; Imagine Entertainment	$52 million	$355.2 million
1995	Strange Days	Kathryn Bigelow	Lightstorm Entertainment; 20th Century Fox	$42 million	$17 million
1996	Sgt. Bilko	Jonathan Lynn	Universal Pictures; Imagine Entertainment	$39 million	$7 million
1996	Chain Reaction	Andrew Davis	20th Century Fox	$50 million	$60.2 million
1996	The Island of Dr. Moreau	John Frankenheimer	New Line Cinema	$40 million	$49.6 million
1997	Dante's Peak	Roger Donaldson	Universal Pictures	$116 million	$178.1 million
1997	The Fifth Element	Luc Besson	Gaumont	$90 million	$263.9 million
1997	Red Corner	Jon Avnet	Metro-Goldwyn-Mayer	$48 million	$22 million
1997	Titanic	James Cameron	Paramount Pictures; 20th Century Fox; Lightstorm Entertainment	$200 million	$2.264 billion
1997	Kundun	Martin Scorsese	Touchstone Pictures	$28 million	$5.7 million
1998	Armageddon	Michael Bay	Touchstone Pictures; Jerry Bruckheimer Films	$140 million	$553.7 million
1998	What Dreams May Come	Vincent Ward	Polygram Filmed Entertainment	$85‒90 million	$75.4 million
1999	EDtv	Ron Howard	Universal Pictures; Imagine Entertainment	$80 million	$35.2 million
1999	Lake Placid	Steve Miner	20th Century Fox	$27–35 million	$56.9 million
1999	Fight Club	David Fincher	20th Century Fox	$63–65 million	$101.2 million

=== 2000s ===
Year	Films	Director(s)	Studio(s) and distributor(s)	Budget	Gross
2000	Supernova	Walter Hill; Uncredited: Jack Sholder; Francis Ford Coppola	Metro-Goldwyn-Mayer	$60–90 million	$14.8 million
2000	Rules of Engagement	William Friedkin	Paramount Pictures	$60 million	$71.7 million
2000	O Brother, Where Art Thou?	Joel and Ethan Coen	Touchstone Pictures; Universal Pictures; StudioCanal	$26 million	$71.9 million
2000	X-Men	Bryan Singer	20th Century Fox	$75 million	$296.3 million
2000	Red Planet	Antony Hoffman	Warner Bros. Pictures	$80 million	$33.5 million
2000	How the Grinch Stole Christmas	Ron Howard	Universal Pictures; Imagine Entertainment	$123 million	$345.8 million
2001	The Lord of the Rings: The Fellowship of the Ring	Peter Jackson	New Line Cinema	$93 million	$898.2 million
2001	Vanilla Sky	Cameron Crowe	Paramount Pictures; Summit Entertainment	$68 million	$203.4 million
2001	A Beautiful Mind	Ron Howard	Universal Pictures; DreamWorks Pictures; Imagine Entertainment	$58 million	$316.8 million
2002	We Were Soldiers	Randall Wallace	Paramount Pictures	$75 million	$115.4 million
2002	The Time Machine	Simon Wells	DreamWorks Pictures; Warner Bros. Pictures	$80 million	$123.7 million
2002	xXx	Rob Cohen	Revolution Studios	$88.3 million	$277.4 million
2002	Adaptation	Spike Jonze	Columbia Pictures	$19 million	$32.8 million
2002	Star Trek: Nemesis	Stuart Baird	Paramount Pictures	$60 million	$67.3 million
2003	Daredevil	Mark Steven Johnson	20th Century Fox	$78 million	$179.2 million
2003	Willard	Glen Morgan	New Line Cinema	TBA	$8.5 million
2003	The Italian Job	F. Gary Gray	Paramount Pictures	$60 million	$176.1 million
2003	Secondhand Lions	Tim McCanlies	New Line Cinema	$30 million	$48.3 million
2003	Looney Tunes: Back in Action	Joe Dante	Warner Bros. Pictures	$80 million	$68.5 million
2003	The Missing	Ron Howard	Columbia Pictures; Revolution Studios; Imagine Entertainment	$60 million	$38.4 million
2003	Peter Pan	P.J. Hogan	Universal Pictures; Columbia Pictures; Revolution Studios	$130 million	$122 million
2004	The Day After Tomorrow	Roland Emmerich	20th Century Fox; Lionsgate	$125 million	$552.6 million
2004	I, Robot	Alex Proyas	20th Century Fox	$120 million	$353.1 million
2004	Flight of the Phoenix	John Moore	20th Century Fox	$45-75 million	$34.5 million
2005	Cinderella Man	Ron Howard	Universal Pictures; Touchstone Pictures; Miramax Films; Imagine Entertainment	$88 million	$108.5 million
2005	Dark Water	Walter Salles	Touchstone Pictures	TBA	$44.4–49.5 million
2005	Charlie and the Chocolate Factory	Tim Burton	Warner Bros. Pictures	$150 million	$475.8 million
2005	Stealth	Rob Cohen	Columbia Pictures	$135 million	$79.3 million
2005	Æon Flux	Karyn Kusama	Paramount Pictures; Lakeshore Entertainment	$55-62 million	$52.3 million
2006	My Super Ex-Girlfriend	Ivan Reitman	20th Century Fox	$30 million	$61.1 million
2006	Zoom	Peter Hewitt	Columbia Pictures; Revolution Studios	$75.6 million	$12.5 million
2006	The Texas Chainsaw Massacre: The Beginning	Johnathan Liebesman	New Line Cinema	$16 million	$51.8 million
2006	Flags of Our Fathers	Clint Eastwood	DreamWorks Pictures; Warner Bros. Pictures; Paramount Pictures; Amblin Entertainment	$90 million	$65.9 million
2006	Letters from Iwo Jima	Clint Eastwood	DreamWorks Pictures; Warner Bros. Pictures; Paramount Pictures; Amblin Entertainment	$19 million	$68.7 million
2006	The Nativity Story	Catherine Hardwicke	New Line Cinema	$35 million	$46.4 million
2007	The Hitcher	Dave Meyers	Rogue Pictures	$10 million	$25.4 million
2007	Zodiac	David Fincher	Paramount Pictures; Warner Bros. Pictures	$65–85 million	$84.7 million
2007	Meet the Robinsons	Stephen Anderson	Walt Disney Pictures	$150 million	$169.3 million
2007	Pirates of The Caribbean: At World's End	Gore Verbinski	Walt Disney Pictures; Jerry Bruckheimer Films	$300 million	$963.4 million
2007	We Own the Night	James Gray	Columbia Pictures	$21–28 million	$55.3 million
2007	Transformers	Michael Bay	DreamWorks Pictures; Paramount Pictures	$150–200 million	$709.7 million
2007	The Seeker	David L. Cunningham	20th Century Fox	$45 million	$31.8 million
2007	The Golden Compass	Chris Weitz	New Line Cinema	$180 million	$372.2 million
2008	Jumper	Doug Liman	20th Century Fox	$85 million	$225.1 million
2008	Speed Racer	The Wachowskis	Warner Bros. Pictures	$120 million	$93.9 million
2008	The Mummy: Tomb of the Dragon Emperor	Rob Cohen	Universal Pictures	$145 million	$403.4 million
2008	Gran Torino	Clint Eastwood	Warner Bros. Pictures	$25–33 million	$270 million
2008	The Curious Case of Benjamin Button	David Fincher	Paramount Pictures; Warner Bros. Pictures	$150–167 million	$335.8 million
2009	Star Trek	J.J. Abrams	Paramount Pictures; Spyglass Entertainment	$150 million	$385.7 million
2009	Night at the Museum: Battle of the Smithsonian	Shawn Levy	20th Century Fox	$150 million	$413.1 million
2009	Transformers: Revenge of the Fallen	Michael Bay	DreamWorks Pictures; Paramount Pictures	$200–210 million	$836.5 million
2009	G.I. Joe: The Rise of Cobra	Stephen Sommers	Paramount Pictures; Spyglass Entertainment	$175 million	$302.5 million
2009	2012	Roland Emmerich	Columbia Pictures	$200 million	$791.2 million

=== 2010s ===
Year	Films	Director(s)	Studio(s) and distributor(s)	Budget	Gross
2010	Percy Jackson & the Olympians: The Lightning Thief	Chris Columbus	20th Century Fox	$95 million	$226.4 million
2010	The A-Team	Joe Carnahan	20th Century Fox	$100–110 million	$177.2 million
2010	Tron: Legacy	Joseph Kosinski	Walt Disney Pictures	$170 million	$400.1 million
2011	Thor	Kenneth Branagh	Paramount Pictures; Marvel Studios	$150 million	$449.3 million
2011	X-Men: First Class	Matthew Vaughn	20th Century Fox	$140–160 million	$353.6 million
2011	Transformers: Dark of the Moon	Michael Bay	Paramount Pictures	$195 million	$1.124 billion
2011	The Help	Tate Taylor	DreamWorks Pictures	$25 million	$216.6 million
2011	Fright Night	Craig Gillespie	DreamWorks Pictures	$30 million	$41 million
2011	Real Steel	Shawn Levy	DreamWorks Pictures	$110 million	$299.3 million
2011	Killer Elite	Gary McKendry	Open Road Films	$70 million	$56.4 million
2011	The Girl with the Dragon Tattoo	David Fincher	Columbia Pictures; Metro-Goldwyn-Mayer	$90 million	$239.3 million
2012	Journey 2: The Mysterious Island	Brad Peyton	New Line Cinema	$80 million	$335 million
2012	The Avengers	Joss Whedon	Marvel Studios; Paramount Pictures	$220–225 million	$1.519 billion
2012	The Paperboy	Lee Daniels	Millennium Media	$12.5 million	$3.78 million
2012	The Amazing Spider-Man	Marc Webb	Columbia Pictures	$200–230 million	$758 million
2012	Rock of Ages	Adam Shankman	New Line Cinema	$75 million	$59.4 million
2012	The Watch	Akiva Schaffer	20th Century Fox	$68 million	$68.3 million
2013	Jack the Giant Slayer	Bryan Singer	New Line Cinema; Legendary Pictures	$185–200 million	$197 million
2013	G.I. Joe: Retaliation	Jon M. Chu	Paramount Pictures; Metro-Goldwyn-Mayer; Skydance Media	$130-155 million	$375.7 million
2013	Oblivion	Joseph Kosinski	Universal Pictures	$120 million	$287.9 million
2013	Iron Man 3	Shane Black	Marvel Studios; Paramount Pictures	$200 million	$1.215 billion
2013	Her	Spike Jonze	Warner Bros. Pictures; Annapurna Pictures	$23 million	$48.3 million
2013	Ender's Game	Gavin Hood	Summit Entertainment	$110–115 million	$125.5 million
2013	47 Ronin	Carl Rinsch	Universal Pictures	$175–225 million	$151.8 million
2014	X-Men: Days of Future Past	Bryan Singer	20th Century Fox	$200–205 million	$746 million
2014	Lost River	Ryan Gosling	Warner Bros. Pictures	TBA	$615,500
2014	Maleficent	Robert Stromberg	Walt Disney Pictures	$180–263 million	$758.5 million
2014	Into the Storm	Steven Quale	New Line Cinema	$50 million	$161.7 million
2014	Gone Girl	David Fincher	20th Century Fox	$61 million	$369.3 million
2014	Night at the Museum: Secret of the Tomb	Shawn Levy	20th Century Fox	$127 million	$363.2 million
2015	Blackhat	Michael Mann	Universal Pictures; Legendary Pictures	$70 million	$19.7 million
2015	Furious 7	James Wan	Universal Pictures	$190 million	$1.515 billion
2015	Pixels	Chris Columbus	Columbia Pictures	$88–129 million	$244.9 million
2015	Eye in the Sky	Gavin Hood	Entertainment One	$13 million	$35.4 million
2016	Deadpool	Tim Miller	20th Century Fox	$58 million	$782.8 million
2016	Everybody Wants Some!!	Richard Linklater	Paramount Pictures; Annapurna Pictures	$10 million	$5.4 million
2016	The Huntsmen: Winter's War	Cedric Nicolas-Troyan	Universal Pictures	$115 million	$165 million
2016	The Jungle Book	Jon Favreau	Walt Disney Pictures	$175–177 million	$966.6 million
2016	X-Men: Apocalypse	Bryan Singer	20th Century Fox	$178 million	$543.9 million
2016	Popstar: Never Stop Never Stopping	Akiva Schaffer; Jorma Taccone	Universal Pictures	$20 million	$9.7 million
2016	Independence Day: Resurgence	Roland Emmerich	20th Century Fox	$165 million	$389.7 million
2016	Free State of Jones	Gary Ross	STX Entertainment	$50 million	$25 million
2016	Suicide Squad	David Ayer	Warner Bros. Pictures; DC Films	$175 million	$749.2 million
2016	All I See Is You	Marc Forster	Open Road Films	$30 million	$678,150
2016	Passengers	Morten Tyldum	Columbia Pictures	$110–150 million	$303.1 million
2017	Beauty and the Beast	Bill Condon	Walt Disney Pictures	$160–255 million	$1.266 billion
2017	Power Rangers	Dean Israelite	Lionsgate	$100‒105 million	$142.5 million
2017	The Fate of the Furious	F. Gary Gray	Universal Pictures	$250–270 million	$1.236 billion
2017	The Mummy	Alex Kurtzman	Universal Pictures	$125–195 million	$410 million
2017	Spider-Man: Homecoming	Jon Watts	Columbia Pictures; Marvel Studios	$175 million	$880.2 million
2017	Thor: Rangarok	Taika Waititi	Marvel Studios	$180 million	$865 million
2018	Black Panther	Ryan Coogler	Marvel Studios	$200 million	$1.349 billion
2018	A Wrinkle in Time	Ava DuVernay	Walt Disney Pictures	$100–130 million	$133.2 million
2018	Ready Player One	Steven Spielberg	Warner Bros. Pictures	$155–175 million	$607.9 million
2018	Avengers: Infinity War	Anthony and Joe Russo	Marvel Studios	$325–400 million	$2.052 billion
2018	Ant-Man and the Wasp	Peyton Reed	Marvel Studios	$130–195 million	$622.7 million
2018	Hidden Man	Jiang Wen	Gravity Pictures	TBA	$85 million
2018	Shadow	Zhang Yimou	Tencent Pictures; Well Go USA Entertainment	TBA	$91.7 million
2018	Aquaman	James Wan	Warner Bros. Pictures; DC Films	$160–200 million	$1.152 billion
2018	Hello Mr. Billionaire	Fei Yan; Damo Peng	Alibaba Pictures	TBA	$367 million
2018	Taxiwaala	Rahul Sankrityan	GA2 Pictures	₹7 crore	₹42 crore
2018	2.0	S. Shankar	Lyca Productions; AA Films	₹400–600 crore	₹699.89 crore
2019	NTR: Kathanayakudu	Krish Jagarlamudi	Vaaraahi Chalana Chitram	₹50 crore	₹32 crore
2019	Captain Marvel	Anna Boden and Ryan Fleck	Marvel Studios	$152–175 million	$1.131 billion
2019	The Curse of La Llorona	Michael Chaves	New Line Cinema	$9 million	$123.1 million
2019	Shazam!	David F. Sandberg	New Line Cinema; DC Films	$90–100 million	$367.8 million
2019	Avengers: Endgame	Anthony and Joe Russo	Marvel Studios	$356–400 million	$2.799 billion
2019	Terminator: Dark Fate	Tim Miller	Paramount Pictures; 20th Century Fox; Skydance Media; Tencent Pictures; Lightstorm Entertainment	$185–196 million	$261.1 million
2019	Sye Raa Narasimha Reddy	Surender Reddy	Excel Entertainment; AA Films	₹200–300 crore	₹240 crore

=== 2020s ===
Year	Films	Director(s)	Studio(s) and distributor(s)	Budget	Gross
2020	The Rescue	Dante Lam	Tencent Pictures; Bona Film Group	$90 million	$74.9 million
2020	Sonic the Hedgehog	Jeff Fowler	Paramount Pictures	$85–90 million	$320 million
2020	Stargirl	Julia Hart	Walt Disney Pictures	N/A	N/A
2020	Children of the Corn	Kurt Wimmer	RLJE Films	$10 million	$575,179
2021	Chaos Walking	Doug Liman	Lionsgate	$100–125 million	$27.1 million
2021	Black Widow	Cate Shortland	Marvel Studios	$288.5 million	$379.8 million
2021	After Yang	Kogonada	A24; Showtime	$9–20 million	$729,254
2021	Free Guy	Shawn Levy	20th Century Studios	$100–125 million	$331.5 million
2021	Shang-Chi and the Legend of the Ten Rings	Destin Daniel Cretton	Marvel Studios	$150–200 million	$432.2 million
2021	Dune	Denis Villeneuve	Warner Bros. Pictures; Legendary Pictures	$165 million	$434.8 million
2021	West Side Story	Steven Spielberg	20th Century Studios; Amblin Entertainment	$100 million	$76 million
2021	Spider-Man: No Way Home	Jon Watts	Columbia Pictures; Marvel Studios	$200 million	$1.922 billion
2022	The Adam Project	Shawn Levy	Netflix; Skydance Media	$116 million	N/A
2022	Morbius	Daniel Espinosa	Columbia Pictures	$75–83 million	$167.5 million
2022	RRR	S. S. Rajamouli	DVV Entertainments; Pen Studios	₹550 crore	₹1,387.26 crore
2022	Fantastic Beasts: The Secrets of Dumbledore	David Yates	Warner Bros. Pictures	$200 million	$407.2 million
2022	Doctor Strange and the Multiverse of Madness	Sam Raimi	Marvel Studios	$294.5 million	$955.8 million
2022	Thirteen Lives	Ron Howard	Metro-Goldwyn-Mayer; Amazon Studios; Imagine Entertainment	$55 million	N/A
2022	Black Adam	Jaume Collet-Serra	New Line Cinema; DC Films	$190–260 million	$393.5 million
2022	Black Panther: Wakanda Forever	Ryan Coogler	Marvel Studios	$200–250 million	$859.2 million
2022	Ordinary Hero	Tony Chan	Alibaba Pictures	N/A	N/A
2023	Ant-Man and the Wasp: Quantumania	Peyton Reed	Marvel Studios	$276—327 million	$476.1 million
2023	The Mother	Niki Caro	Netflix	N/A	N/A
2023	Extraction 2	Sam Hargrave	Netflix	N/A	N/A
2023	Hidden Strike	Scott Waugh	Netflix	$80 million	$917,381
2023	Agent	Surender Reddy	B4U Films	₹85 crores	₹8.5 crore
2023	Ponniyin Selvan: II	Mani Ratnam	Madras Talkies; Lyca Productions; Red Giant Movies	₹250 crore	₹350 crore
2023	Blue Beetle	Ángel Manuel Soto	Warner Bros. Pictures; DC Studios	$104–125 million	$130.8 million
2024	Madame Web	S. J. Clarkson	Columbia Pictures	$80–100 million	$91 million
2024	Dune: Part Two	Denis Villeneuve	Warner Bros. Pictures; Legendary Pictures	$190 million	$711.8 million
2024	Kalki 2898 AD	Nag Ashwin	AA Films	₹600 crore	₹1,042–1,100 crore
2024	Stree 2	Amar Kaushik	PVR Inox Pictures	₹50–105 crore	₹874.58 crore
2024	Devara: Part 1	Koratala Siva	N. T. R. Arts	₹250–300 crore	₹380–521 crore
2024	Venom: The Last Dance	Kelly Marcel	Columbia Pictures	$110 million	$478.9 million
2025	Creation of the Gods II: Demon Force	Wuershan	CMC Pictures	$120 million	$173.22 million
2025	Captain America: Brave New World	Julius Onah	Marvel Studios	$180 million	$415 million
2025	A Minecraft Movie	Jared Hess	Warner Bros. Pictures	$150 million	$961.2 million
2025	Thunderbolts*	Jake Schreier	Marvel Studios	$180 million	$382.4 million
2025	Fountain of Youth	Guy Ritchie	Apple Studios	$180 million	N/A
2025	The Fantastic Four: First Steps	Matt Shakman	Marvel Studios	$181 million	$521.9 million
2025	The Wizard of Oz at Sphere	Victor Fleming	Sphere Studios; Warner Bros. Pictures	$100 million	N/A
2025	The Conjuring: Last Rites	Michael Chaves	New Line Cinema	$55 million	$499.3 million
2025	Baahubali: The Epic	S. S. Rajamouli	Arka Media Works	N/A	₹51.72 crore
2026	Disclosure Day	Steven Spielberg	Universal Pictures; Amblin Entertainment	$115 million	$241 million
2026	Supergirl	Craig Gillespie	Warner Bros. Pictures; DC Studios	$170–186 million	$126.4 million
2026	Jana Nayagan	H. Vinoth	KVN Productions	₹300–500 crore	₹300–325 crore
2026	Toxic	Geetu Mohandas	KVN Productions; Monster Mind Creations	₹500–1,000 crore	
2026	Digger	Alejandro Gonzalez Inarritu	Legendary Pictures; TC Productions	$125-180 million	$42 million
2026	Matchbox: The Movie	Sam Hargrave	Apple Studios; Skydance Media; Mattel Studios	TBA	—N/a
2026	Street Fighter	Kitao Sakurai	Paramount Pictures; Legendary Pictures; Capcom	$82 million	$52.8 million

=== Upcoming ===
Year	Films	Director(s)	Studio(s) and distributor(s)	Budget	Gross
2026	Avengers: Doomsday †	Anthony and Joe Russo	Marvel Studios	TBA	—N/a
2027	Godzilla x Kong: Supernova †	Grant Sputore	Warner Bros. Pictures; Legendary Pictures	TBA	—N/a
2027	Varanasi †	S.S. Rajamouli	Sri Durga Arts / Showing Business		

== Television series ==
Year(s)	Title	Network	Ref.
2013–2020	Agents of S.H.I.E.L.D.	ABC	
2015–2016	Black Sails (seasons 2–3)	Starz	
2016–2020	The Good Place	NBC	
2017	The Mist	Spike	
2017	Outlander	Starz	
2018–2019	A Series of Unfortunate Events (seasons 2–3)	Netflix	
2019–2020	The Twilight Zone	CBS All Access	
2019–2021	Lost In Space (seasons 2–3)	Netflix	
2020–present	Chuggington: Tales from the Rails	Disney Junior	
2021	WandaVision	Disney+	
2022	Ms. Marvel	Disney+	
2022	She-Hulk: Attorney at Law	Disney+	
2023–present	Citadel	Amazon Prime Video	
2024	Agatha All Along	Disney+	

== Awards ==
=== Film ===
Year	Award	Title	Result	Ref.
1994	Academy Award for Best Visual Effects	True Lies	Nominated	
1995	Academy Award for Best Visual Effects	Apollo 13	Nominated	
1997	Academy Award for Best Visual Effects	Titanic	Won	
1998	Academy Award for Best Visual Effects	What Dreams May Come	Won	
2004	Academy Award for Best Visual Effects	I, Robot	Nominated	
2008	Academy Award for Best Visual Effects	The Curious Case of Benjamin Button	Won	
2011	Academy Award for Best Visual Effects	Real Steel	Nominated	
2011	Academy Award for Best Visual Effects	Transformers: Dark of the Moon	Nominated	

Digital Domain has also earned multiple British Academy (BAFTA) Awards for excellence in digital imagery and animation.

=== Design ===
Year	Award	Recipients	Title	Ref.
1998	Academy of Motion Picture Arts and Sciences (AMPAS) Scientific and Technical Achievement Award	Dr. Douglas R. Roble	Track (tracking software)	
2001	AMPAS Scientific and Technical Achievement Award	Bill Spitzak, Paul Van Camp, Jonathan Egstad and Price Pethel	Nuke (compositing software)	
2004	AMPAS Scientific and Technical Achievement Award	Alan Kapler	Storm (volumetric renderer)	
2007	AMPAS Scientific and Technical Achievement Award	Dr. Douglas R. Roble, Nafees Bin Zafar and Ryo Sakaguchi	Storm (fluid simulation system)	

=== Awards ===
Digital Domain artists and technologists have been recognized with ten Academy Awards: three for Best Visual Effects (Titanic, What Dreams May Come, The Curious Case of Benjamin Button); and seven for Scientific and Technical Achievement for its proprietary technology such as Track (tracking software), for Nuke (compositing software), for Storm (volumetric renderer), and for its fluid simulation system.

The company's work has been nominated for eleven Academy Awards for Best Visual Effects (Apollo 13, True Lies, I, Robot, Real Steel,Transformers: Dark of the Moon, Iron Man 3, X-Men: Days of Future Past, Avengers: Infinity War, Ready Player One,Spider-Man: No Way Home, and Free Guy). In addition, its excellence in digital imagery and animation has earned Digital Domain multiple British Academy (BAFTA) Awards.

Digital Domain's advertising division provides digital imagery and animation for television commercials, working with top commercial directors. To date, it has been awarded 21 Clio Awards, 25 AICP Awards, 15 Cannes Lion Awards and numerous other advertising honors. The advertising division has also produced multiple music videos working with artists (including The Rolling Stones, Faith Hill, Creed, Janet Jackson, Busta Rhymes, Björk, Celine Dion, Michael Jackson and Nine Inch Nails) which have earned Grammy and MTV "Music Video of the Year" Awards.

== See also ==
- Industrial Light & Magic (ILM)
- Sony Pictures Imageworks
- Wētā FX
- Wētā Workshop
- Blur Studio
- Cinesite
- Rhythm & Hues Studios (R&H)
- Framestore
- Moving Picture Company (MPC)
- DNEG
- Image Engine
- Pixomondo
- Lego Alpha Team (video game)
