= Scott Ross (film executive) =

American film executive (born 1951)

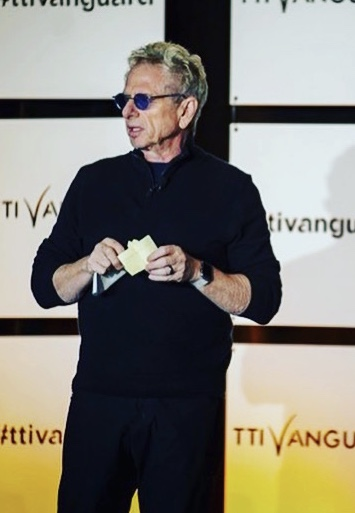
- Born: November 20, 1951 (age 74); New York City, U.S.
- Occupations: producer, digital media executive
- Years active: 1980–present

Scott Ross (born November 20, 1951) is an American digital media executive with a career spanning three decades. In the 1980s he led George Lucas' companies and in 1993 he founded, along with James Cameron and Stan Winston, Digital Domain, Inc.

== Biography ==
A native of New York City, Ross began his career in media studies at Hofstra University, where he graduated with a BS in communication arts in 1974. He returned to Hofstra in June 1997 to receive an honorary doctorate degree from his alma mater. Ross is a member of the Academy of Motion Picture Arts and Sciences (OSCARS) and the Academy of Television Arts and Sciences (EMMYS). He has worked on over 100 of the world's largest special effects films and has lectured extensively about the creative process, content and technology in over 30 countries around the world.

== Career ==
In the 1980s Ross was general manager of Lucasfilm's Industrial Light and Magic (ILM) and under his leadership, ILM won five Academy Awards for Best Visual Effects (Who Framed Roger Rabbit, Innerspace, Terminator 2: Judgment Day, The Abyss, Death Becomes Her). The company re-organized in 1991 and Ross was named senior vice president of the LucasArts Entertainment Company, which comprised Skywalker Sound, LucasArts Commercial Productions, LucasArts Attractions, EditDroid/SoundDroid and ILM.

During his leadership at ILM, Ross helped transition ILM into the digital age by spearheading the use of computers, digital imaging, digital scanning and recording, ushering in the digital age for filmmakers.

As CEO/Chairman of Digital Domain from 1993-2006, DD garnered two Academy Awards and five nominations, receiving its first Oscar in 1997 for the ground-breaking visual effects in Titanic. That was followed by a second Oscar for What Dreams May Come. Digital Domain received additional nominations for True Lies, Apollo 13 , and I, Robot , and also won three Scientific and Technical Academy Awards for its proprietary software, which included the current industry standard compositing software, NUKE.

Ross launched Digital Domain Films, a feature film production division. The first feature film produced by Ross was the New Line Cinema release Secondhand Lions which achieved both critical and box office success. In 2006, as Digital Domain's CEO and Chairman, Ross sold Digital Domain to Wyndcrest Holdings led by film director, Michael Bay, and his partner John Textor.

Ross has served as a board member and advisor to companies and schools such as the Beijing Film Academy, Lenovo Computers, DeTao Masters Academy in Shanghai, Eyellusion (a holographic live concert touring production company), Digikore Studios in Pune, India, Frame By Frame in Rome, Italy, ARwall (a leading Virtual Production services company) and was a co-founder of Trojan Horse Was A Unicorn, the definitive gathering of global digital artists which takes place annually in Troia Portugal.

He has also served as a Visiting Fellow at Peking University, where he has participated in academic programs, lectures, and international collaborations related to digital filmmaking and visual effects innovation.

=== Book ===
In 2024, Ross published Upstart, a nonfiction book that examines the rise of digital production and the transformation of the motion picture industry. The book focuses on the emergence of computer-generated imagery, the restructuring of studio production models, and the business challenges facing visual effects companies during the digital transition.

=== Public speaking and views ===
Ross is an active keynote speaker at international conferences addressing film production, visual effects, artificial intelligence, and digital media economics. His speaking engagements frequently focus on the business sustainability of the visual effects industry and the technological shifts reshaping creative labor in the age of AI.

Ross has also continued to publicly critique the long-term sustainability of visual effects studios. In industry interviews and public discussions, he has stated that the current business model is not a viable economic model for VFX companies, citing the disadvantages of a fixed contract where the VFX facility has all of the financial responsibility but none of the authority to make final decisions about the VFX work.

== Controversy ==
Ross had a falling out with his co-founder, James Cameron, over a conflict of interest whereby Cameron insisted, as co-owner of Digital Domain, that it continue working overtime on Titanic leading the company close to bankruptcy. Although he achieved some success in producing Secondhand Lions, other productions including Instant Karma, Plant Life, Shadowplay, and A Thousand Cranes remain in Hollywood development hell.
