= Lego Alpha Team (video game) =

2000 video game

- Developers: Digital Domain; Climax Studios (GBC)
- Publisher: Lego Media
- Engine: NetImmerse
- Platforms: Windows, Game Boy Color
- Release: Windows: EU: September 22, 2000; NA: September 29, 2000; Game Boy Color: NA: November 7, 2000; UK: November 17, 2000
- Genre: Puzzle
- Mode: Single-player

Lego Alpha Team is a 2000 puzzle video game developed by Digital Domain and published by Lego Media in September 2000 for Windows. A Game Boy Color adaptation of the game was developed by Climax Studios and published in November 2000. It was originally known by its working title Lego Action Team.

The game follows Agent Dash, who has to rescue the other Alpha Team members from Ogel and stop production of the mind control orbs. After rescuing an agent, they are playable in some levels as well. During development, the game held the working title Lego Logic and the team's name was "TILT" (Trans-International Lego Team).

Lego Media announced its partnership with Digital Domain in October 1998.
