= Jigsaw Jones Mysteries =

American children's novel series

- Author: James Preller
- Country: England
- Language: English
- Genre: Murder mystery
- Publisher: Scholastic Corporation
- Published: 1998–2017
- Media type: Print (hardcover and paperback)
- No. of books: 35

The Jigsaw Jones Mysteries is an American series of young children's detective fiction written by New York author James Preller. The series is published by Scholastic Corporation. The first book was published in 1998; 32 regular mysteries appeared between 1998 and 2007 plus six Super Special mysteries between 2001 and 2008. A 33rd book in the regular series is to be published in August 2017.

== Books in this series ==
1. The Case of Hermie the Missing Hamster
2. The Case of the Christmas Snowman
3. The Case of the Secret Valentine
4. The Case of the Spooky Sleepover
5. The Case of the Stolen Baseball Cards
6. The Case of the Mummy Mystery
7. The Case of the Runaway Dog
8. The Case of the Great Sled Race
9. The Case of the Stinky Science Project
10. The Case of the Ghostwriter
11. The Case of the Marshmallow Monster
12. The Case of the Class Clown
13. The Case of the Detective in Disguise
14. The Case of the Bicycle Bandit
15. The Case of the Haunted Scarecrow
16. The Case of the Sneaker Sneak^{[title variant]}
17. The Case of the Disappearing Dinosaur
18. The Case of the Bear Scare
19. The Case of the Golden Key
20. The Case of the Race Against Time
21. The Case of the Rainy-Day Mystery
22. The Case of the Best Pet Ever
23. The Case of the Perfect Prank
24. The Case of the Glow-in-the-Dark Ghost
25. The Case of the Vanishing Painting
26. The Case of the Double-Trouble Detective
27. The Case of the Frog-Jumping Contest
28. The Case of the Food Fight
29. The Case of the Snowboarding Superstar
30. The Case of the Kidnapped Candy
31. The Case of the Spoiled Rotten Spy
32. The Case of the Groaning Ghost
33. The Case from Outer Space
34. The Case of the Smelly Sneaker
35. The Case of the Hat Burglar

=== Super Specials and Others ===
- Jigsaw Jones Super Special #1: The Case of the Buried Treasure
- Jigsaw Jones Super Special #2: The Case of the Million Dollar Mystery
- Jigsaw Jones Super Special #3: The Case of the Missing Falcon
- Jigsaw Jones Super Special #4: The Case of the Santa Claus Mystery
- Jigsaw Jones Super Special #5: The Case of the Four-Leaf Clover
- Jigsaw Jones Super Special #6: The Case of the Wild Turkey Chase
- Jigsaw Jones Detective Tips

== Characters ==
- Theodore "Jigsaw" Jones: The main character of the series. He once claimed that he himself was the first detective in the whole second grade.
- Mila Yeh: The partner of Jigsaw and his best friend.

=== Jigsaw's school ===
- Miss Gleason: The class teacher.
- Lucy Hiller: A girl in Jigsaw's class who Bigs likes.
- Helen Zuckerman: A smart but unfunny girl.
- Athena Lorenzo: A bad tempered girl.
- Danika Starling: A girl who likes magic.
- Geetha Nair: A very shy girl.
- Bobby Solofsky: An enemy detective to Theodore.
- Timothy "Wingnut" O'Brien: Nicknamed because his ears were three sizes too big.
- Charlie "Bigs" Maloney: One of the class's nicest people and the toughest and the strongest in second grade.
- Joey Pignattano: A gluttonous boy.
- Jasper "Stringbean" Noonan: Nicknamed because he is as thin as a stringbean.
- Ralphie Jordan: The class clown and prankster.
- Eddie Becker: A boy who dreams of becoming rich.
- Mr. Rogers: The principal.
- Mr. Copabianco: The janitor.

=== Jigsaw's family ===
- Jigsaw's dad: A detective when he was in Grade 2, and studied in the same room (Room 201) as Jigsaw.
- Jigsaw's mom: Came from Hackensack, New Jersey, is very strict about the words "hate" and "dumb".
- Billy, Daniel and Nick: Older brothers of Jigsaw.
- Hillary: Jigsaw's older sister.
- Rags: Jigsaw's dog.
- Grams: Jigsaw's grandmother.

=== Others ===
- Mike and Mary: Owner of Our Daily Bread and Pita shop near the school, and family friends of the Jones.
- Marc "Red Cap": A teenager who lives near Our Bread and Pita, friend of Jigsaw, Mike and Mary.
- Reginard Armitage Pinkerton III: The richest kid in the town.
- Chase Jackson: The star of the TV show Spy Guy and Jigsaw's friend. Chase appeared in the book #31 The Case of the Spoiled Rotten Spy

== Notes ==
Also published in 2017 as The Case of the Smelly Sneaker
