= James Preller =

American novelist

James Preller (born February 1, 1961) is an American writer of children's books including Bystander, Six Innings, and the Jigsaw Jones Mysteries.

He grew up in Wantagh, New York and went to college in Oneonta, New York. After graduating from college in 1983, he worked as a waiter for one year before being hired as a copywriter by Scholastic Corporation. After meeting many notable children's writers through their books, he was inspired to try writing himself. His first book, MAXX TRAX: Avalanche Rescue, was published in 1986. Since then Preller has written a variety of books, some under pen names including Mitzy Kafka, James Patrick, and Izzy Bonkers. He lives in Delmar, New York, with his wife Lisa and their three children.

Preller made up stories when he was young and sold them to friends, family, and neighbors. At that time, however, he planned to become a baseball player for the New York Mets.

== Published books ==
=== Novels ===
- The Fox and the Hound, Scholastic, 1988
- The Iron Giant: A Novelization, Scholastic, 1999
- Six Innings (2008)
- Along Came Spider (2008)
- Bystander (2009)
- Justin Fisher Declares War!, Scholastic, 2010
- Before You Go, Feiwel & Friends, 2012
- The Fall (2015)
- The Courage Test (2016)
- Better Off Undead, Feiwel & Friends, 2017
- Blood Mountain, Feiwel & Friends, 2019
- Upstander (2021)

=== Scary Tales ===
Published by Feiwel & Friends.

1. Home Sweet Horror, 2013
2. I Scream, You Scream!, 2013
3. Good Night, Zombie, 2013
4. Nightmareland, 2014
5. One-Eyed Doll, 2014
6. Swamp Monster, 2015

=== Jigsaw Jones ===
Published by Scholastic Corporation.

1. The Case of Hermie the Missing Hamster
2. The Case of the Christmas Snowman
3. The Case of the Secret Valentine
4. The Case of the Spooky Sleepover
5. The Case of the Stolen Baseball Cards
6. The Case of the Mummy Mystery
7. The Case of the Runaway Dog
8. The Case of the Great Sled Race
9. The Case of the Magic Ground Wart
10. The Case of the Stinky Science Project
11. The Case of the Ghostwriter
12. The Case of the Stinky Vase
13. The Case of the Marshmallow Monster
14. The Case of the Class Clown
15. The Case of the Lunch Lady and Mr. Lemon
16. The Case of the Detective in Disguise
17. The Case of the Bicycle Bandit
18. The Case of the Tic Tacs in Mom’s Bedside Table
19. The Case of the Haunted Scarecrow
20. The Case of the Sneaker Sneak
21. The Case of the Disappearing Dinosaur
22. The Case of the Missing Jigsaw Puzzle Pieces
23. The Case of the Bear Scare
24. The Case of the Golden Key
25. The Case of the Race Against Time
26. The Case of the Rainy Day Mystery
27. The Case of the Summer Sausage
28. The Case of the Best Pet Ever
29. The Case of the Perfect Prank
30. The Case of the Glow-in-the-Dark Ghost
31. The Case of the Vanishing Painting
32. The Case of the Double Trouble Detectives
33. The Case of the Frog-Jumping Contest
34. The Case of the Food Fight
35. The Case of the Skateboarding Superstar
36. The Case of the Kidnapped Candy
37. The Case of the Missing Case of Dad’s Soda
38. The Case of the Spoiled Rotten Spy
39. The Case of the Groaning Ghost
40. The Case of the Hat Burglar

=== Picture books ===
Title	Publication date	Publisher	ISBN
Big Top Pee-wee: Pee-wee and the Circus	1988	Scholastic	
Wake Me in Spring	1994	Scholastic	
Hiccups for Elephant	1995	Scholastic	
Space Jam	1996	Scholastic	
Godzilla	1998	Scholastic	
Ghost Cat and Other Spooky Tales	2007	Scholastic	
Along Came Spider	2008	Scholastic	
Six Innings	2008	Square Fish	
Bystander	2009	Square Fish	
Mighty Casey	2009	Feiwel & Friends	
A Pirate's Guide to First Grade	2010	Feiwel & Friends	
A Pirate's Guide to Recess	2013	Feiwel & Friends	
All Welcome Here	2020	Feiwel & Friends	
A Pirate's Guide to Divorce	2022	Feiwel & Friends	
