= Tim McCanlies =

American filmmaker

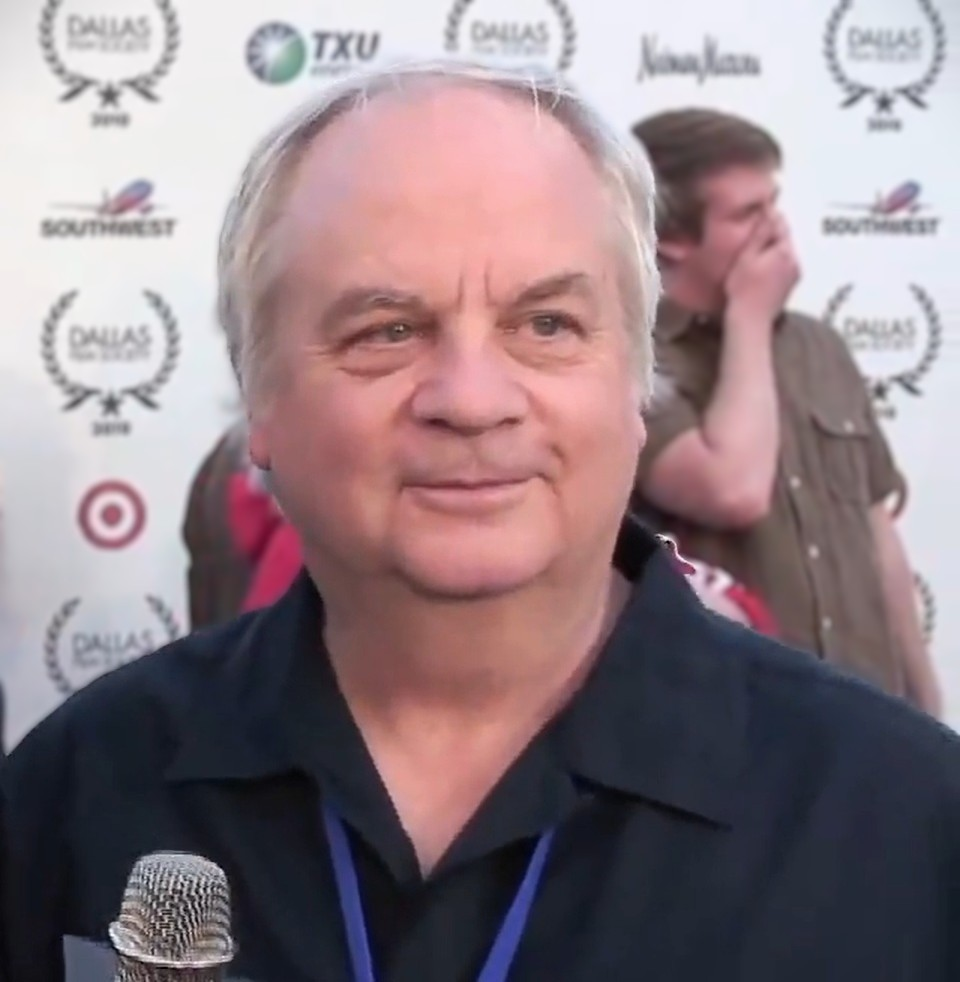
- McCanlies in 2010
- Born: 1953 (age 72–73); McAllen, Texas, U.S.
- Occupations: Screenwriter; film director
- Years active: 1983–present

Tim McCanlies (born 1953) is an American screenwriter and film director. He is best known for writing and directing Secondhand Lions and for writing the screenplay for The Iron Giant.

== Early life and education ==
Tim McCanlies was born in 1953 in McAllen, Texas. McCanlies’s father served in the U.S. Air Force, and the family traveled extensively.

As a child, he was interested in both acting and the behind-the-scenes technical work of filmmaking. McCanlies attended high school in Bryan, Texas and took some college-level courses at nearby Texas A&M University. While he was in high school, he did not participate in the school's theatre program, but instead went to the local movie theatre and learned how to run the projector.

In 1971, he moved to Austin and enrolled at the University of Texas, majoring in Radio-Television-Film. After several years, McCanlies transferred to Texas A&M.

== Career ==
McCanlies moved to Dallas in 1975, where he worked as a police officer and took graduate film classes at Southern Methodist University. In his film classes, he learned various screenplay techniques and made several short films that were accepted in national competitions. In 1978, he was offered the opportunity to direct commercials near the Dallas area, but he decided instead to move to Los Angeles and attempt to become a screenwriter. After moving to Los Angeles, he planned on attending the American Film Institute. His first paying job for writing was a low budget film called Crazies. McCanlies supported his income during this time by writing computer programs. With a limited income stream, McCanlies decided against enrolling in the Film Institute.

McCanlies worked for Walt Disney Studios in the 1980s (The Fox and the Hound) as a story artist. After signing a two-year contract with Disney Studios as his first job, he pitched his own screenplay to the studio, but was turned down. After McCanlies's contract with Disney ended, and after marrying his wife Suzanne in 1988, they moved back to Texas. At this time he started to work with most of the major studios as a script doctor and writer for hire. He worked on films such as Touchstone's Shoot to Kill (1988), Warner Bros’ Little Giants (1994) and My Fellow Americans (1996). In 1994, he was invited to speak at the first Heart of Austin Heart of Texas Film Festival and Screenwriters conference.

He started production on his directorial debut, Dancer, Texas Pop. 81, in 1997, thanks to the support from Ignite Entertainment. The film grossed just under $700,000 in the United States. It was met with generally positive reviews, with the film staying in theatres longer in Texas, while being removed from New York theatres after only a week. The film began to be played in other rural areas after its initial release. The film then made its way to the London Film Festival, as well as playing in Australia.

McCanlies wrote the screenplay for The Iron Giant in 1999. The film received universal acclaim and it ranked seventh in Premiere's list of the 100 best movies of 1999 (a summary of the critics’ picks for the year). He won multiple awards for his work, including an Annie Award (accomplishments in animation) and an award from the British Academy of Film and Television Arts.

His second directing project, Secondhand Lions, achieved greater success than his first. The film starred Robert Duvall, Michael Caine, and Haley Joel Osment in a story about a young boy staying with his strange uncles for the summer. It was released in 2003 and was met with mostly good reviews, including Roger Ebert giving it three out of four stars.

In 2015, McCanlies adapted a novel written by Turk Pipkin into a film called When Angels Sing.

== Filmography ==
Year	Title	Credited as			Notes
Year	Title	Director	Writer	Associate producer	Notes
1983	Scalps	No	No	Yes	
1987	North Shore	No	Yes	Yes	
1998	Dancer, Texas Pop. 81	Yes	Yes	No	
1998	Dennis the Menace Strikes Again	No	Yes	No	Direct-to-video
1999	The Iron Giant	No	Yes	No	Annie Award for Outstanding Individual Achievement in Writing in an Animated Feature Production; BAFTA Award for Best Feature Film
2001–2011	Smallville	No	Concept	No	195 episodes
2003	Secondhand Lions	Yes	Yes	No	
2009	The 2 Bobs	Yes	Yes	No	
2009	Alabama Moon	Yes	No	No	
2012	Angels Sing	Yes	No	No	
