= Secondhand Lions =

2003 film by Tim McCanlies

- Theatrical release poster
- Directed by: Tim McCanlies
- Written by: Tim McCanlies
- Produced by: David Kirschner; Scott Ross; Corey Sienega
- Starring: Michael Caine; Robert Duvall; Haley Joel Osment; Nicky Katt; Kyra Sedgwick
- Cinematography: Jack N. Green
- Edited by: David Moritz
- Music by: Patrick Doyle
- Production companies: Digital Domain; David Kirschner Productions
- Distributed by: New Line Cinema
- Release date: September 19, 2003
- Running time: 111 minutes
- Country: United States
- Language: English
- Budget: $30 million
- Box office: $48.3 million

Secondhand Lions is a 2003 American comedy-drama film written and directed by Tim McCanlies. It tells the story of an introverted young boy (Haley Joel Osment), who is sent to live with his eccentric great uncles (Robert Duvall and Michael Caine) on a farm in Texas.

== Plot ==
In 1962, 14-year-old Walter's irresponsible mother, Mae, sends him to live for the summer on the ramshackle Texas farm of his reclusive, bachelor great uncles, Hub and Garth. They are said to have a secret fortune amassed from past adventures and are the target of every traveling salesman. They, in turn, sit on their porch with shotguns, shooting at the salesmen.

Walter is given a room in the attic and is not welcomed by his uncles until they realize that Walter's presence annoys other gold-digging relatives. Walter persuades his uncles to try spending some of their money. First, on a clay pigeon launcher. Then, packets of seeds to plant a vegetable garden turn out all to be corn. The uncles then order a lion for a hunting target, but end up with a tame, retired circus lioness, who becomes Walter's pet.

While loading 50-pound (23-kg) bags of Lion Chow, Hub faints and briefly goes to the hospital. Later, at a roadside diner, four greasers pull switchblades on Hub, but he quickly subdues them. Hub and Garth bring the teens home to patch them up and find that the elderly lioness has escaped her cage, claiming the cornfield her new "jungle" home. Hub gives the teens a speech about growing up and being men before sending them home.

A subplot develops around the photograph of a beautiful woman that Walter finds in the attic. Garth tells Walter the story of their past in the French Foreign Legion, during which Hub married an Arab princess, named Jasmine, who was promised to a powerful sheik. After living in constant peril from assassins, Hub spared the sheik's life after a duel on condition that the manhunt ceased. However, Jasmine later died in childbirth, and Hub returned to the French Foreign Legion, until he and Garth retired to their farm, where they resignedly waited to die.

Late one evening, Walter trails Garth and discovers that his uncles have a money-filled room underneath the barn. On another night, Mae arrives with her latest boyfriend, a supposed private investigator, named Stan; he claims Hub, Garth and Jasmine were bank robbers, and demanded the money's location. When Walter chooses to believe Garth's stories instead, Stan pins Walter down and beats him. The old lioness emerges from the cornfield and attacks Stan; awakened by the noise, Hub and Garth find that the animal has died of heart failure defending her "cub".

The next day, Walter leaves with his mother. Once on the road, Mae explains that Stan will be staying with them to recuperate. Walter asks her to "do something that's best for me for once" and abandons her. While Hub and Garth are delighted to see him back, Walter insists changes must be made: his uncles must involve themselves in his education and live carefully, as he wants them to die of old age.

Seventeen years later, the local sheriff alerts Walter that his uncles have died, after a failed stunt in their biplane. Walter returns to the farm and is given his uncles' will, which leaves everything to him. A helicopter bearing the logo Western Sahara Petroleum touches down near the farm, and a man steps out with his young son, explaining that he heard about Hub and Garth's deaths on the radio. He had recognized the names as the two Americans in tales told to him in his youth by his grandfather, "a very wealthy sheik". When the man's young son asks Walter if his uncles lived, Walter confirms: "Yeah. They really lived".

== Cast ==
- Haley Joel Osment as Walter Caldwell
- Robert Duvall as Hub McCann
- Michael Caine as Garth McCann
- Kyra Sedgwick as Mae Coleman
- Nicky Katt as Stan
- Josh Lucas as Adult Walter Caldwell
- Michael O'Neill as Ralph
- Deirdre O'Connell as Helen
- Christian Kane as Young Hub
- Daniel Brooks as Sheik's great-grandson
- Kevin Haberer as Young Garth
- Eric Balfour as Sheik's grandson
- Emmanuelle Vaugier as Jasmine
- Adam Ozturk as The Sheik
- Adrian Pasdar as Skeet Machine Salesman
- Mitchel Musso as Boy
- Jennifer Stone as Martha
- Taureg as Jasmine the Lion
- Billy Joe Shaver as Delivery Truck Driver
- Travis Willingham as Hood

== Closing credits ==
Director Tim McCanlies, who was an admirer of cartoonist Berkeley Breathed, wrote requesting work of his to feature in the film. Breathed sent the drawings of a strip, called Walter and Jasmine, which is presented as the work of the grown-up Walter, and they also accompany the final credits. Film critic and former animator Korey Coleman was initially set to do the artwork, but was called at the last minute by a representative that Breathed had only just accepted the offer, after having been silent. Coleman admitted that the incident was humorously embarrassing, as several of his family and friends were already spreading the word of his "success".

== Reception ==
=== Box office ===
In its opening weekend the film grossed $12,900,000 in 3,013 theaters in the United States and Canada, ranking second behind Underworld. The film grossed $42,070,939 domestically and $6,178,078 internationally, for a worldwide total of $48,249,017.

=== Critical ===
The film holds a 61% approval rating from critics on review aggregator Rotten Tomatoes based on 135 reviews, with an average rating of 6.1/10. The website's critics consensus reads: "A wholesome but schmaltzy movie". On Metacritic, the film holds a weighted average score of 52 out of 100, based on 33 critics, indicating "mixed or average reviews". Audiences polled by CinemaScore gave the film an average grade of "A", on an A+ to F scale.

== Home media ==
The film was released in VHS and on DVD in February 3, 2004 and Blu-Ray on December 1, 2009.
