= List of American films of 2015 =

This is a list of American films released in 2015.

== Box office ==
The highest-grossing American films released in 2015, by domestic box office gross revenue, are as follows:

Highest-grossing films of 2015
Rank	Title	Distributor	Domestic Gross
1	Star Wars: The Force Awakens	Disney	$936,662,225
2	Jurassic World	Universal	$652,270,625
3	Avengers: Age of Ultron	Disney	$459,005,868
4	Inside Out	Disney	$356,461,711
5	Furious 7	Universal	$353,007,020
6	Minions	Universal	$336,045,770
7	The Hunger Games: Mockingjay – Part 2	Lionsgate	$281,723,902
8	The Martian	20th Century Fox	$228,433,663
9	Cinderella	Disney	$201,151,353
10	Spectre	Sony	$200,074,609

=== Box office records ===
- Jurassic World grossed $208.8 million domestically in its opening weekend, making it the biggest domestic opening weekend of all time, surpassing The Avengers ($207.4 million on 4–6 May 2012). The film also grossed $106.6 million domestically in its second weekend, making it the biggest domestic second weekend of all time, surpassing The Avengers again ($103 million on 11–13 May 2012). In its third weekend, the film grossed $54.5 million, becoming just the third film to gross more than $50 million in its third weekend, along with The Avengers and Avatar. Onv vĠ June 19, the film became the 51st film to reach $300 million, and the fastest film to do so, achieving the milestone in just eight days, surpassing The Avengers (which took nine days to reach the benchmark); on June 21, the film became the 17th film to reach $400 million, and the fastest film to do so, achieving the milestone in just ten days, surpassing The Avengers (which took fourteen days to reach the benchmark); on June 28, the film became the fifth film to reach $500 million (joining The Avengers, Avatar, The Dark Knight, and Titanic) and the fastest film to do so, achieving the milestone in just 17 days, surpassing The Avengers (which took 23 days to reach the benchmark). On July 17, the film became the fourth film to reach $600 million and the fastest film to do so, achieving the milestone in 36 days, surpassing Avatar (which took 47 days to reach the benchmark). On September 23, the film became the third film to reach $650 million, achieving the milestone in 104 days, which is second-fastest behind Avatar (which took 58 days to reach the benchmark); it also became the third film to gross over $650 million domestically while also grossing over $1 billion outside North America.
- Inside Out grossed $90.4 million domestically in its opening weekend, making it the biggest domestic opening weekend for an original film of all time, surpassing Avatar ($77 million on 18–20 December 2009). The film became the fastest animated film to reach $100 million, achieving the milestone in just four days, surpassing Shrek 2 (which took five days to reach the benchmark). On July 18, Inside Out became the eighth animated film, and 52nd film over all, to gross more than $300 million domestically, joining Shrek 2, The Lion King, Toy Story 3, Frozen, Finding Nemo, Despicable Me 2, and Shrek the Third. On September 11, the film became the seventh animated film to gross more than $350 domestically.
- Minions grossed $46.04 million domestically on its opening day, making it the biggest domestic opening day for an animated film, surpassing Toy Story 3 ($41.1 million on 18 June 2010). The film became the fastest animated film to reach $100 million, achieving the milestone in just three days, surpassing Inside Out; the film also joined Toy Story 3 as the fastest animated film to reach $200 million, achieving the milestone in nine days. On August 8, Minions became the ninth animated film, and 53rd film overall, to gross more than $300 million domestically.
- Straight Outta Compton grossed $60.2 million domestically in its opening weekend, making it the biggest domestic opening weekend for a music biopic of all time, surpassing Walk the Line ($22.3 million on 18–20 November 2005). The film took only nine days to gross $100 million at the domestic box office, becoming only the second music biopic to cross the milestone, and surpassing Walk the Line (which took 65 days to reach the benchmark). By August 27, the film had earned $120.9 million to become the highest domestic grossing music biopic of all time, surpassing Walk the Line ($119.5 million), and by September 21, the film had earned $188.99 million to become the highest worldwide grossing music biopic of all time, surpassing Walk the Line's worldwide lifetime gross of $186.4 million.
- Star Wars: The Force Awakens grossed $57 million domestically in Thursday preview showings, making it the biggest preview showing of all time, surpassing Harry Potter and the Deathly Hallows – Part 2 ($43.5 million in previews on 14 July 2011); the total included a record $5.7 million in IMAX ticket sales, surpassing Avengers: Age of Ultron ($3 million on 30 April 2015).
  - The film went on to gross $119.1 million domestically on Friday (including Thursday's receipts), making it the biggest opening day and the biggest single day of all time, again surpassing Deathly Hallows – Part 2 ($91 million on 15 July 2011) to become the only film ever to gross more than $100 million in a single day and the fastest film to reach the $100 million milestone (surpassing 15 other films, including most recently Jurassic World on 12–13 June 2015, which took two days to reach the benchmark). Excluding Thursday preview receipts, Force Awakens grossed $62.1 million on its opening Friday, surpassing Deathly Hallows – Part 2 ($47.5 million on 15 July 2011); the film's Friday total included a record $14 million in IMAX ticket sales.
  - The film also grossed $68.3 million on Saturday, the third-highest Saturday gross (behind Jurassic World, The Avengers) and becoming the fourth film to gross more than $60 million on a Saturday (along with Iron Man 3); the film then grossed $60.5 million on Sunday, becoming the first film to gross more than $60 million on a Sunday and surpassing Jurassic World ($57.2 million on 14 June 2015), for a total weekend gross of $248 million, making it the biggest domestic opening weekend of all time, surpassing Jurassic World ($208.8 million on 12–14 June 2015). The total also contributed to a record total weekend gross of $305.55 million for all films, surpassing the weekend of 12–14 June 2015 ($266 million during the opening of Jurassic World), and was the biggest December opening weekend of all time, surpassing The Hobbit: An Unexpected Journey ($84.6 million on 14–16 December 2012), including a record $30.1 million in IMAX ticket sales. On December 21, the film grossed another $40.1 million, surpassing Spider-Man 2 ($27.7 million on 5 July 2004) for biggest Monday gross and becoming the first film ever to gross more than $30 million and $40 million on a Monday; the film also become the fastest film to gross $250 million, achieving the milestone in four days and surpassing Jurassic World (which took five days to reach the benchmark). On December 22, the film grossed another $37.36 million, surpassing The Amazing Spider-Man ($35 million on 3 July 2012) for biggest Tuesday gross; the film also became the 54th to reach $300 million, and the fastest film to do so, achieving the milestone in just five days, surpassing Jurassic World (which took eight days to reach the benchmark). On December 24th, the film earned another $27.59 million to raise its domestic opening week gross to $391.1 million, surpassing Jurassic World ($296.2 million on 12–18 June 2015). On 25 December, the film grossed $49.3 million, breaking the record for a non-opening Friday gross by surpassing Transformers: Revenge of the Fallen ($36.74 million on 26 June 2009), and breaking the record for a Christmas Day gross by more than doubling Sherlock Holmes ($24.6 million on 25 December 2009); the day also raised the film's total domestic gross to $440.4 million, breaking the record for an 8-day gross and surpassing Jurassic World ($325.3 million on 12–19 June 2015), as well as becoming the 18th film to reach $400 million, and the fastest film to do so, achieving the milestone in just eight days, surpassing Jurassic World (which took ten days to reach the benchmark). On December 26, the film grossed another $56.6 million, breaking the record for highest second Saturday gross and surpassing The Avengers ($42.9 million on 12 May 2012) before grossing an additional $47.6 million on Sunday and breaking the record for highest second Sunday gross and surpassing Jurassic World ($38.4 million on 21 June 2015); the film grossed a total of $153.5 million in its second weekend, making the biggest domestic second weekend of all time and surpassing Jurassic World ($106.6 million on 19–21 June 2015), and raised its total domestic gross to $544.57 million, making Force Awakens just the sixth film to reach $500 million, and the fastest film to do so, achieving the milestone in just ten days and surpassing Jurassic World (which took 17 days to reach the benchmark).

== January–March ==
Opening		Title	Production company	Cast and crew	Ref.
J A N U A R Y	2	The Woman in Black: Angel of Death	Relativity Media / Hammer Films	Tom Harper (director); Jon Croker (screenplay); Phoebe Fox, Jeremy Irvine, Helen McCrory, Adrian Rawlins, Leanne Best, Ned Dennehy	
J A N U A R Y	9	Let's Kill Ward's Wife	Well Go USA Entertainment	Scott Foley (director/screenplay); Patrick Wilson, Scott Foley, Donald Faison, James Carpinello, Amy Acker, Dagmara Domińczyk, Marika Domińczyk, Greg Grunberg, Nicollette Sheridan	
J A N U A R Y	14	Match	IFC Films	Stephen Belber (director/screenplay); Patrick Stewart, Carla Gugino, Matthew Lillard	
J A N U A R Y	16	Blackhat	Universal Pictures / Legendary Pictures	Michael Mann (director); Morgan Davis Foehl (screenplay); Chris Hemsworth, Tang Wei, Viola Davis, Ritchie Coster, Holt McCallany, Yorick van Wageningen, Wang Leehom	
J A N U A R Y	16	Little Accidents	Amplify	Sara Colangelo (director/screenplay); Elizabeth Banks, Boyd Holbrook, Chloë Sevigny, Jacob Lofland, Josh Lucas	
J A N U A R Y	16	Spare Parts	Lionsgate	Sean McNamara (director); Elissa Matsueda (screenplay); George Lopez, Jamie Lee Curtis, Carlos PenaVega, Esai Morales, José Julián, David Del Rio, Oscar Gutierrez, Alexa PenaVega, Alessandra Rosaldo, Marisa Tomei	
J A N U A R Y	16	The Wedding Ringer	Screen Gems / Miramax Films / Will Packer Productions	Jeremy Garelick (director/screenplay); Jay Lavender (screenplay); Kevin Hart, Josh Gad, Kaley Cuoco, Ken Howard, Cloris Leachman, Jenifer Lewis, Mimi Rogers, Olivia Thirlby	
J A N U A R Y	16	Vice	Lionsgate / Emmett/Furla/Oasis Films	Brian A. Miller (director); Andre Fabrizio, Jeremy Passmore (screenplay); Thomas Jane, Bruce Willis, Ambyr Childers, Johnathon Schaech, Bryan Greenberg, Charlotte Kirk, Tyler Olson	
J A N U A R Y	20	Veronika Decides to Die	Entertainment One	Emily Young (director); Roberta Hanley, Larry Gross (screenplay); Sarah Michelle Gellar, Jonathan Tucker, Erika Christensen, Florencia Lozano, Melissa Leo, David Thewlis	
J A N U A R Y	23	The Boy Next Door	Universal Pictures	Rob Cohen (director); Barbara Curry (screenplay); Jennifer Lopez, Ryan Guzman, John Corbett, Ian Nelson, Kristin Chenoweth	
J A N U A R Y	23	The Humbling	Millennium Films	Barry Levinson (director); Buck Henry, Michal Zebede (screenplay); Al Pacino, Greta Gerwig, Dianne Wiest, Nina Arianda, Dylan Baker, Charles Grodin, Dan Hedaya, Billy Porter, Kyra Sedgwick, Mary Louise Wilson	
J A N U A R Y	23	Mortdecai	Lionsgate / OddLot Entertainment	David Koepp (director); Eric Aronson (screenplay); Johnny Depp, Gwyneth Paltrow, Ewan McGregor, Olivia Munn, Jeff Goldblum, Paul Bettany	
J A N U A R Y	23	Song One	Cinedigm	Kate Barker-Froyland (director/screenplay); Anne Hathaway, Johnny Flynn, Ben Rosenfield, Mary Steenburgen	
J A N U A R Y	23	Strange Magic	Touchstone Pictures / Lucasfilm	Gary Rydstrom (director/screenplay); David Berenbaum. Irene Mecchi (screenplay); Alan Cumming, Evan Rachel Wood, Kristin Chenoweth, Maya Rudolph, Sam Palladio, Alfred Molina	
J A N U A R Y	23	We'll Never Have Paris	Orion Pictures	Simon Helberg (director/screenplay); Simon Helberg, Melanie Lynskey, Zachary Quinto, Maggie Grace, Jason Ritter, Alfred Molina	
J A N U A R Y	30	Black or White	Relativity Media	Mike Binder (director/screenplay); Kevin Costner, Octavia Spencer, Jillian Estell, Bill Burr, Jennifer Ehle, Andre Holland, Gillian Jacobs, Anthony Mackie	
J A N U A R Y	30	The Loft	Open Road Films	Erik Van Looy (director); Bart De Pauw, Wesley Strick (screenplay); Karl Urban, James Marsden, Wentworth Miller, Eric Stonestreet, Matthias Schoenaerts, Isabel Lucas, Rachael Taylor	
J A N U A R Y	30	Project Almanac	Paramount Pictures / MTV Films / Insurge Pictures / Platinum Dunes	Dean Israelite (director); Jason Harry Pagan, Andrew Deutschman (screenplay); Jonny Weston, Sofia Black-D'Elia, Sam Lerner, Allen Evangelista, Virginia Gardner, Amy Landecker	
J A N U A R Y	30	Wild Card	Lionsgate	Simon West (director); William Goldman (screenplay); Jason Statham, Michael Angarano, Milo Ventimiglia, Dominik Garcia-Lorido, Anne Heche, Sofia Vergara, Max Casella, Jason Alexander, Hope Davis, Stanley Tucci	
F E B R U A R Y	6	3 Nights in the Desert	Monterey Media	Gabriel Cowan (director); Adam Chanzit (screenplay); Amber Tamblyn, Wes Bentley, Vincent Piazza.	
F E B R U A R Y	6	The SpongeBob Movie: Sponge Out of Water	Paramount Pictures / Paramount Animation / Nickelodeon Movies	Paul Tibbitt (director); Jonathan Aibel, Glenn Berger (screenplay); Antonio Banderas, Tom Kenny, Clancy Brown, Rodger Bumpass, Bill Fagerbakke, Carolyn Lawrence, Mr. Lawrence, Matt Berry, Jill Talley, Mary Jo Catlett, Lori Alan, Riki Lindhome, Kate Micucci, Peter Shukoff, Lloyd Ahlquist, Carlos Alazraqui, Eric Bauza, Tim Conway, Eddie Deezen, Nolan North, Rob Paulsen, Kevin Michael Richardson, April Stewart, Cree Summer, Billy West, Paul Tibbitt, Dee Bradley Baker, Tom Wilson, Sirena Irwin, Mark Fite	
F E B R U A R Y	6	Enter the Dangerous Mind	Well Go USA Entertainment	Youssef Delara (director); Victor Teran (director/screenplay); Jake Hoffman, Nikki Reed, Thomas Dekker, Jason Priestley, Gina Rodriguez, Ana Claudia Talancón, Noel Gugliemi, John Earl Jelks, Scott Bakula	
F E B R U A R Y	6	Jupiter Ascending	Warner Bros. Pictures / Village Roadshow Pictures / RatPac Entertainment	The Wachowskis (director/screenplay); Channing Tatum, Mila Kunis, Sean Bean, Eddie Redmayne, Douglas Booth	
F E B R U A R Y	6	Seventh Son	Universal Pictures / Legendary Pictures	Sergei Bodrov (director); Charles Leavitt, Steven Knight (screenplay); Jeff Bridges, Ben Barnes, Alicia Vikander, Kit Harington, Olivia Williams, Antje Traue, Djimon Hounsou, Julianne Moore	
F E B R U A R Y	6	The Voices	Lionsgate	Marjane Satrapi (director); Michael R. Perry (screenplay); Ryan Reynolds, Gemma Arterton, Anna Kendrick, Jacki Weaver	
F E B R U A R Y	10	Accidental Love	Millennium Entertainment	David O. Russell (director); David O. Russell, Kristin Gore, Dave Jeser, and Matt Silverstein (screenplay); Jessica Biel, Jake Gyllenhaal, Catherine Keener, James Marsden, Tracy Morgan, Paul Reubens, Kurt Fuller, James Brolin	
F E B R U A R Y	13	Da Sweet Blood of Jesus	The Asylum	Spike Lee (director/screenplay); Bill Gunn (screenplay); Zaraah Abrahams, Stephen Tyrone Williams, Rami Malek, Elvis Nolasco	
F E B R U A R Y	13	Fifty Shades of Grey	Universal Pictures	Sam Taylor-Johnson (director); Kelly Marcel (screenplay); Dakota Johnson, Jamie Dornan, Jennifer Ehle, Marcia Gay Harden	
F E B R U A R Y	13	Kingsman: The Secret Service	20th Century Fox	Matthew Vaughn (director/screenplay); Jane Goldman (screenplay); Colin Firth, Samuel L. Jackson, Mark Strong, Taron Egerton, Michael Caine	
F E B R U A R Y	13	The Last Five Years	The Weinstein Company	Richard LaGravenese (director/screenplay); Anna Kendrick, Jeremy Jordan	
F E B R U A R Y	20	The DUFF	Lionsgate / CBS Films	Ari Sandel (director); Josh A. Cagan (screenplay); Mae Whitman, Robbie Amell, Bella Thorne, Bianca Santos, Skyler Samuels, Romany Malco, Ken Jeong, Allison Janney	
F E B R U A R Y	20	Hot Tub Time Machine 2	Paramount Pictures	Steve Pink (director); Josh Heald (screenplay); Rob Corddry, Craig Robinson, Clark Duke, Adam Scott, Chevy Chase	
F E B R U A R Y	20	McFarland, USA	Walt Disney Pictures	Niki Caro (director); Christopher Cleveland, Bettina Gilois, Grant Thompson (screenplay); Kevin Costner, Maria Bello, Morgan Saylor	
F E B R U A R Y	27	Everly	Dimension Films	Joe Lynch (director); Yale Hannon (screenplay); Salma Hayek	
F E B R U A R Y	27	Focus	Warner Bros. Pictures / RatPac Entertainment	Glenn Ficarra, John Requa (director/screenplay); Will Smith, Margot Robbie	
F E B R U A R Y	27	The Lazarus Effect	Relativity Media	David Gelb (director); Luke Dawson, Jeremy Slater (screenplay); Mark Duplass, Olivia Wilde, Donald Glover, Evan Peters, Sarah Bolger.	
F E B R U A R Y	27	Maps to the Stars	Focus Features	David Cronenberg (director); Bruce Wagner (screenplay); Julianne Moore, Mia Wasikowska, Olivia Williams, Evan Bird, Sarah Gadon, John Cusack, Robert Pattinson	
M A R C H	6	Bad Asses on the Bayou	Samuel Goldwyn Films	Craig Moss (director/screenplay); Danny Trejo, Danny Glover, John Amos, Loni Love, Sammi Rotibi, Jimmy Bennett	
M A R C H	6	Chappie	Columbia Pictures / Media Rights Capital	Neill Blomkamp (director/screenplay); Terri Tatchell (screenplay); Sharlto Copley, Dev Patel, Hugh Jackman, Ninja, Yolandi Visser, Jose Pablo Cantillo, Sigourney Weaver	
M A R C H	6	Road Hard	FilmBuff	Adam Carolla (director/screenplay); Kevin Hench (screenplay); Adam Carolla, Larry Miller, David Alan Grier, David Koechner	
M A R C H	6	The Second Best Exotic Marigold Hotel	Fox Searchlight Pictures	John Madden (director); Ol Parker (screenplay); Judi Dench, Maggie Smith, Dev Patel, Bill Nighy, Celia Imrie, Penelope Wilton, Ronald Pickup, David Strathairn, Richard Gere.	
M A R C H	6	Unfinished Business	20th Century Fox / Regency Enterprises	Ken Scott (director); Steven Conrad (screenplay); Vince Vaughn, Tom Wilkinson, Dave Franco, Sienna Miller, Nick Frost, James Marsden	
M A R C H	6	Faults	Screen Media Films	Riley Stearns (director/screenplay); Leland Orser, Mary Elizabeth Winstead, Chris Ellis, Jon Gries, Lance Reddick, Beth Grant	
M A R C H	13	Cinderella	Walt Disney Pictures	Kenneth Branagh (director); Chris Weitz (screenplay); Cate Blanchett, Lily James, Richard Madden, Stellan Skarsgård, Holliday Grainger, Derek Jacobi, Helena Bonham Carter	
M A R C H	13	The Cobbler	Image Entertainment	Tom McCarthy (director); Paul Sado (screenplay); Adam Sandler, Method Man, Ellen Barkin, Melonie Diaz, Dan Stevens, Steve Buscemi	
M A R C H	13	Cymbeline	Lionsgate	Michael Almereyda (director/screenplay); Ethan Hawke, Ed Harris, Milla Jovovich, John Leguizamo, Penn Badgley, Dakota Johnson, Anton Yelchin, Peter Gerety, Kevin Corrigan, Vondie Curtis-Hall, James Ransone, Bill Pullman, Delroy Lindo	
M A R C H	13	Home Sweet Hell	Vertical Entertainment	Anthony Burns (director); Carlo Allen, Ted Elrick, Tom Lavagnino (screenplay); Katherine Heigl, Patrick Wilson, Jordana Brewster, Kevin McKidd, A.J. Buckley, Chi McBride, Jim Belushi	
M A R C H	13	It Follows	RADiUS-TWC	David Robert Mitchell (director/screenplay); Maika Monroe, Keir Gilchrist, Daniel Zovatto, Jake Weary, Olivia Luccardi, Lili Sepe	
M A R C H	13	Muck	Anchor Bay Entertainment	Steve Wolsh (director/screenplay); Lachlan Buchanan, Puja Mohindra, Bryce Draper, Stephanie Danielson, Laura Jacobs, Grant Alan Ouzts, Lauren Francesca	
M A R C H	13	Run All Night	Warner Bros. Pictures / RatPac Entertainment / Vertigo Entertainment	Jaume Collet-Serra (director); Brad Ingelsby (screenplay); Liam Neeson, Joel Kinnaman, Vincent D'Onofrio, Nick Nolte, Bruce McGill, Genesis Rodriguez, Common, Ed Harris	
M A R C H	20	Danny Collins	Bleecker Films	Dan Fogelman (director/screenplay); Al Pacino, Annette Bening, Jennifer Garner, Bobby Cannavale, Christopher Plummer	
M A R C H	20	The Divergent Series: Insurgent	Summit Entertainment / Red Wagon Entertainment	Robert Schwentke (director); Brian Duffield, Akiva Goldsman, Mark Bomback (screenplay); Shailene Woodley, Theo James, Octavia Spencer, Jai Courtney, Ray Stevenson, Zoë Kravitz, Miles Teller, Ansel Elgort, Maggie Q, Naomi Watts, Kate Winslet	
M A R C H	20	Do You Believe?	Freestyle Releasing	Jon Gunn (director); Chuck Konzelman, Cary Solomon (screenplay); Mira Sorvino, Sean Astin, Alexa PenaVega, Delroy Lindo, Ted McGinley, Andrea Logan White, Madison Pettis, Brian Bosworth, Liam Matthews, Makenzie Moss, Cybill Shepherd, Lee Majors	
M A R C H	20	The Gunman	Open Road Films	Pierre Morel (director); Don Macpherson, Pete Travis, Sean Penn (screenplay); Sean Penn, Idris Elba, Ray Winstone, Mark Rylance, Jasmine Trinca, Peter Franzén, Javier Bardem	
M A R C H	20	Tracers	Saban Films	Daniel Benmayor (director); Matt Johnson (screenplay); Taylor Lautner, Marie Avgeropoulos, Adam Rayner, Rafi Gavron	
M A R C H	20	The Walking Deceased	ARC Entertainment	Scott Dow (director); Tim Ogletree (screenplay); Tim Ogletree, Joey Oglesby, Dave Sheridan, Troy Ogletree, Sophia Taylor Ali, Danielle Garcia, Andrew Pozza, Mason Dakota Galyon	
M A R C H	27	Get Hard	Warner Bros. Pictures / RatPac Entertainment / Gary Sanchez Productions	Etan Cohen (director/screenplay); Jay Martel, Ian Roberts (screenplay); Will Ferrell, Kevin Hart, Tip 'T.I.' Harris, Alison Brie, Craig T. Nelson	
M A R C H	27	Home	20th Century Fox / DreamWorks Animation	Tim Johnson (director); Tom J. Astle, Matt Ember (screenplay); Jim Parsons, Rihanna, Steve Martin, Jennifer Lopez, Matt Jones, Brian Stepanek, Frank Welker, April Winchell, April Lawrence, Nigel W. Tierney	
M A R C H	27	Serena	Magnolia Pictures	Susanne Bier (director); Christopher Kyle (screenplay); Bradley Cooper, Jennifer Lawrence, Rhys Ifans, Toby Jones, David Dencik, Sean Harris, Ana Ularu	
M A R C H	27	While We're Young	A24 Films	Noah Baumbach (director/screenplay); Ben Stiller, Naomi Watts, Adam Driver, Amanda Seyfried, Charles Grodin, Adam Horovitz	

== April–June ==
Opening		Title	Production company	Cast and crew	Ref.
A P R I L	3	Furious 7	Universal Pictures / Original Film / Media Rights Capital	James Wan (director); Chris Morgan (screenplay); Vin Diesel, Paul Walker, Dwayne Johnson, Michelle Rodriguez, Tyrese Gibson, Chris “Ludacris” Bridges, Jordana Brewster, Djimon Hounsou, Kurt Russell, Jason Statham	
A P R I L	3	Woman in Gold	The Weinstein Company / BBC Films	Simon Curtis (director); Alexi Kaye Campbell (screenplay); Helen Mirren, Ryan Reynolds, Daniel Brühl, Katie Holmes, Tatiana Maslany, Max Irons, Charles Dance, Elizabeth McGovern, Jonathan Pryce	
A P R I L	10	Ex Machina	A24	Alex Garland (director/screenplay); Domhnall Gleeson, Alicia Vikander, Oscar Isaac	
A P R I L	10	The Longest Ride	20th Century Fox	George Tillman, Jr. (director); Craig Bolotin (screenplay); Britt Robertson, Scott Eastwood, Jack Huston, Oona Chaplin, Alan Alda	
A P R I L	10	Lost River	Warner Bros. Pictures	Ryan Gosling (director/screenplay); Christina Hendricks, Saoirse Ronan, Iain De Caestecker, Matt Smith, Eva Mendes, Ben Mendelsohn	
A P R I L	17	1915	Bloodvine Media	Garin Hovannisian, Alec Mouhibian (director/screenplay); Simon Abkarian, Angela Sarafyan, Nikolai Kinski, Debra Christofferson, Jim Piddock, Samuel Page	
A P R I L	17	Alex of Venice	Screen Media Films	Chris Messina (director); Jessica Goldberg, Katie Nehra, Justin Shilton (screenplay); Mary Elizabeth Winstead, Don Johnson, Derek Luke, Katie Nehra, Chris Messina, Skylar Gaertner, Reg E. Cathey, Timm Sharp	
A P R I L	17	Beyond the Reach	Lionsgate	Jean-Baptiste Léonetti (director); Stephen Susco (screenplay); Michael Douglas, Jeremy Irvine, Hanna Mangan-Lawrence, Ronny Cox	
A P R I L	17	Child 44	Summit Entertainment	Daniel Espinosa (director); Richard Price (screenplay); Tom Hardy, Gary Oldman, Noomi Rapace, Joel Kinnaman, Paddy Considine, Jason Clarke, Vincent Cassel	
A P R I L	17	Monkey Kingdom	Disneynature	Mark Linfield, Alastair Fothergill (director); Tina Fey (narrator)	
A P R I L	17	Paul Blart: Mall Cop 2	Columbia Pictures	Andy Fickman (director); Kevin James, Nick Bakay (screenplay); Kevin James, Raini Rodriguez, Neal McDonough, Shirley Knight	
A P R I L	17	The Road Within	Well GO USA	Gren Wells (director/screenplay); Robert Sheehan, Dev Patel, Zoë Kravitz, Robert Patrick, Kyra Sedgwick	
A P R I L	17	True Story	Fox Searchlight Pictures	Rupert Goold (director/screenplay); David Kajganich (screenplay); Jonah Hill, James Franco, Felicity Jones	
A P R I L	17	Unfriended	Universal Pictures	Levan Gabriadze (director); Nelson Greaves (screenplay); Shelley Hennig, Moses Storm, Renee Olstead, Will Peltz, Jacob Wysocki, Courtney Halverson, Heather Sossaman	
A P R I L	24	Adult Beginners	The Weinstein Company	Ross Katz (director); Jeff Cox, Liz Flahive (screenplay); Rose Byrne, Nick Kroll, Bobby Cannavale, Joel McHale	
A P R I L	24	Blackbird	RLJ Entertainment	Patrik-Ian Polk (director/screenplay); Rikki Beadle-Blair (screenplay); Mo'Nique, Isaiah Washington, Julian Walker, Kevin Allesee, Gary LeRoi Gray, Nikki Jane, Torrey Laamar, Terrell Tilford, D. Woods	
A P R I L	24	Brotherly Love	Freestyle Releasing	Jamal Hill (director/screenplay); Keke Palmer, Cory Hardrict, Quincy Brown, Romeo Miller, Eric D. Hill Jr., Macy Gray, Malik Yoba, Faizon Love	
A P R I L	24	Just Before I Go	Anchor Bay Films	Courteney Cox (director); David Flebotte (screenplay); Seann William Scott, Olivia Thirlby, Garret Dillahunt, Kate Walsh, Kyle Gallner, Evan Ross, Rob Riggle, Mackenzie Marsh, Missi Pyle, Connie Stevens, David Arquette, Elisha Cuthbert, Cleo King	
A P R I L	24	Little Boy	Open Road Films	Alejandro Gómez Monteverde (director/screenplay); Pepe Portillo (screenplay); Jakob Salvati, Emily Watson, Cary-Hiroyuki Tagawa, Michael Rapaport, David Henrie, Eduardo Verástegui, Ben Chaplin, Tom Wilkinson	
A P R I L	24	The Age of Adaline	Lionsgate / SKE Films / Lakeshore Entertainment	Lee Toland Krieger (director); J. Mills Goodloe, Salvador Paskowitz (screenplay); Blake Lively, Michiel Huisman, Kathy Baker, Harrison Ford, Ellen Burstyn	
A P R I L	24	The Water Diviner	Warner Bros. Pictures	Russell Crowe (director); Russell Crowe, Olga Kurylenko, Jai Courtney	
M A Y	1	Avengers: Age of Ultron	Marvel Studios	Joss Whedon (director/screenplay); Robert Downey Jr., Chris Hemsworth, Mark Ruffalo, Chris Evans, Scarlett Johansson, Jeremy Renner, Don Cheadle, Aaron Taylor-Johnson, Elizabeth Olsen, Paul Bettany, Cobie Smulders, Anthony Mackie, Hayley Atwell, Idris Elba, Stellan Skarsgård, James Spader, Samuel L. Jackson	
M A Y	8	The D Train	IFC Films	Jarrad Paul, Andrew Mogel (director/screenplay); Jack Black, James Marsden, Kathryn Hahn, Mike White, Jeffrey Tambor	
M A Y	8	Hot Pursuit	Warner Bros. Pictures / New Line Cinema	Anne Fletcher (director); David Feeney, John Quaintance (screenplay); Reese Witherspoon, Sofía Vergara, John Carroll Lynch, Robert Kazinsky	
M A Y	8	Maggie	Lionsgate	Henry Hobson (director); John Scott 3 (screenplay); Arnold Schwarzenegger, Abigail Breslin, Joely Richardson	
M A Y	15	Mad Max: Fury Road	Warner Bros. Pictures / Village Roadshow Pictures / RatPac Entertainment	George Miller (director/screenplay); Brendan McCarthy, Nico Lathouris (screenplay); Tom Hardy, Charlize Theron, Nicholas Hoult, Hugh Keays-Byrne, Rosie Huntington-Whiteley, Riley Keough, Zoë Kravitz, Abbey Lee, Courtney Eaton	
M A Y	15	Pitch Perfect 2	Universal Pictures / Gold Circle Entertainment	Elizabeth Banks (director); Kay Cannon (screenplay); Anna Kendrick, Rebel Wilson, Hailee Steinfeld, Brittany Snow, Skylar Astin, Adam DeVine, Katey Sagal, Anna Camp, Alexis Knapp, Hana Mae Lee, John Michael Higgins, Elizabeth Banks	
M A Y	15	I'll See You in My Dreams	Bleecker Street	Brett Haley (director/screenplay); Marc Basch (screenplay); Blythe Danner, Martin Starr, June Squibb, Rhea Perlman, Mary Kay Place, Malin Åkerman, Sam Elliott	
M A Y	16	Bessie	HBO Films / Flavor Unit Entertainment / The Zanuck Company	Dee Rees (director/screenplay); Christopher Cleveland, Bettina Gilois (screenplay); Queen Latifah, Michael K. Williams, Khandi Alexander, Mike Epps, Tory Kittles, Tika Sumpter, Oliver Platt, Bryan Greenberg, Charles S. Dutton, Mo'Nique, Jeremie Harris, Jim R. Coleman, Joe Knezevich, Chantelle Rose	
M A Y	22	Poltergeist	20th Century Fox / Metro-Goldwyn-Mayer / Ghost House Pictures	Gil Kenan (director); David Lindsay-Abaire (screenplay); Sam Rockwell, Rosemarie DeWitt, Jared Harris, Jane Adams	
M A Y	22	Tomorrowland	Walt Disney Pictures	Brad Bird (director/screenplay); Damon Lindelof (screenplay); George Clooney, Hugh Laurie, Britt Robertson, Raffey Cassidy, Tim McGraw, Kathryn Hahn, Keegan-Michael Key	
M A Y	29	Aloha	Columbia Pictures / Regency Enterprises / RatPac Entertainment / Vinyl Films	Cameron Crowe (director/screenplay); Bradley Cooper, Emma Stone, Rachel McAdams, Bill Murray, John Krasinski, Danny McBride, Alec Baldwin	
M A Y	29	San Andreas	Warner Bros. Pictures / New Line Cinema / Village Roadshow Pictures / RatPac Entertainment	Brad Peyton (director); Carlton Cuse (screenplay); Dwayne Johnson, Carla Gugino, Alexandra Daddario, Ioan Gruffudd, Archie Panjabi, Paul Giamatti	
M A Y	29	Barely Lethal	A24	Kyle Newman (director); John D'Arco (screenplay); Hailee Steinfeld, Thomas Mann, Sophie Turner, Dove Cameron, Jessica Alba, Samuel L. Jackson	
M A Y	29	Heaven Knows What	RADiUS-TWC	Safdie brothers (director); Josh Safdie, Ronald Bronstein (screenplay); Arielle Holmes, Caleb Landry Jones, Buddy Duress, Necro, Eleonore Hendricks	
M A Y	29	Nightingale	HBO Films / Sea Smoke Entertainment / BN Films / Plan B Entertainment / Yoruba Saxon Productions	Elliott Lester (director); Frederick Mensch (screenplay); David Oyelowo	
J U N E	3	Entourage	Warner Bros. Pictures / HBO Films / RatPac Entertainment	Doug Ellin (director/screenplay); Kevin Connolly, Adrian Grenier, Kevin Dillon, Jerry Ferrara, Jeremy Piven	
J U N E	5	Spy	20th Century Fox / Chernin Entertainment	Paul Feig (director/(screenplay); Melissa McCarthy, Jason Statham, Rose Byrne, Miranda Hart, Bobby Cannavale, Allison Janney, Jude Law	
J U N E	5	Insidious: Chapter 3	Focus Features / Blumhouse Productions	Leigh Whannell (director/screenplay); Dermot Mulroney, Stefanie Scott, Angus Sampson, Leigh Whannell, Lin Shaye	
J U N E	5	Love & Mercy	Lionsgate / Roadside Attractions	Bill Pohlad (director); Oren Moverman, Michael Alan Lerner (screenplay); John Cusack, Paul Dano, Elizabeth Banks, Paul Giamatti	
J U N E	12	Jurassic World	Universal Pictures / Amblin Entertainment / Legendary Pictures	Colin Trevorrow (director/screenplay); Rick Jaffa, Amanda Silver, Derek Connolly (screenplay); Chris Pratt, Bryce Dallas Howard, Vincent D'Onofrio, Ty Simpkins, Nick Robinson, Omar Sy, BD Wong, Irrfan Khan	
J U N E	12	Me and Earl and the Dying Girl	Fox Searchlight Pictures / Indian Paintbrush	Alfonso Gomez-Rejon (director); Jesse Andrews (screenplay); Thomas Mann, Olivia Cooke, RJ Cyler, Nick Offerman, Molly Shannon, Jon Bernthal, Connie Britton	
J U N E	19	Dope	Open Road Films	Rick Famuyiwa (director/screenplay); Shameik Moore, Tony Revolori, Kiersey Clemons, Kimberly Elise, Chanel Iman, Tyga, Blake Anderson, Zoë Kravitz, ASAP Rocky	
J U N E	19	Inside Out	Walt Disney Pictures / Pixar Animation Studios	Pete Docter (director/screenplay); Meg LeFauve, Josh Cooley (screenplay); Amy Poehler, Phyllis Smith, Richard Kind, Lewis Black, Bill Hader, Mindy Kaling, Kaitlyn Dias, Diane Lane, Kyle MacLachlan	
J U N E	26	Max	Warner Bros. Pictures / Metro-Goldwyn-Mayer	Boaz Yakin (director/screenplay); Sheldon Lettich (screenplay); Josh Wiggins, Lauren Graham, Thomas Haden Church	
J U N E	26	Ted 2	Universal Pictures / Media Rights Capital / Fuzzy Door Productions / Bluegrass Films	Seth MacFarlane (director/screenplay); Alec Sulkin, Wellesley Wild (screenplay); Mark Wahlberg, Seth MacFarlane, Amanda Seyfried, Morgan Freeman	

== July–September ==
Opening		Title	Production company	Cast and crew	Ref.
J U L Y	1	Terminator Genisys	Paramount Pictures / Skydance Productions	Alan Taylor (director); Laeta Kalogridis, Patrick Lussier (screenplay); Arnold Schwarzenegger, Jason Clarke, Emilia Clarke, Jai Courtney, J. K. Simmons, Dayo Okeniyi, Matt Smith, Courtney B. Vance, Michael Gladis, Sandrine Holt, Lee Byung-hun	
J U L Y	1	Magic Mike XXL	Warner Bros. Pictures / RatPac Entertainment	Gregory Jacobs (director); Reid Carolin (screenplay); Channing Tatum, Matt Bomer, Joe Manganiello, Kevin Nash, Adam Rodríguez, Gabriel Iglesias, Amber Heard, Donald Glover, Andie MacDowell, Elizabeth Banks, Jada Pinkett Smith	
J U L Y	10	Minions	Universal Pictures / Illumination Entertainment	Pierre Coffin, Kyle Balda (director); Brian Lynch (screenplay); Pierre Coffin, Sandra Bullock, Jon Hamm, Michael Keaton, Allison Janney, Steve Coogan, Jennifer Saunders	
J U L Y	10	The Gallows	Warner Bros. Pictures / New Line Cinema / Blumhouse Productions	Chris Lofing, Travis Cluff (director/screenplay); Reese Mishler, Pfeifer Brown, Ryan Shoos, Cassidy Gifford	
J U L Y	10	Self/Less	Focus Features	Tarsem Singh (director); Alex Pastor, David Pastor (screenplay); Ryan Reynolds, Natalie Martinez, Matthew Goode, Victor Garber, Derek Luke, Ben Kingsley	
J U L Y	10	Tangerine	Magnolia Pictures	Sean Baker (director/screenplay); Chris Bergoch (screenplay); Kitana Kiki Rodriguez, Mya Taylor, Karren Karagulian, Mickey O'Hagan, Alla Tumanian, James Ransone	
J U L Y	10	Boulevard	Starz Digital	Dito Montiel (director); Douglas Soesbe (screenplay); Robin Williams, Kathy Baker, Roberto Aguire, Giles Matthey, Bob Odenkirk	
J U L Y	10	Strangerland	Alchemy	Kim Farrant (director); Fiona Seres, Michael Kinirons (screenplay); Nicole Kidman, Joseph Fiennes, Hugo Weaving, Lisa Flanagan, Meyne Wyatt, Maddison Brown, Nicholas Hamilton	
J U L Y	11	7 Days in Hell	HBO Films	Jake Szymanski (director); Murray Miller (screenplay); Andy Samberg, Kit Harington, Mary Steenburgen, Karen Gillan, Lena Dunham, Will Forte, June Squibb, Michael Sheen, Fred Armisen, Howie Mandel, Jon Hamm, Chris Romano, David Copperfield, Chris Evert, Filip Hammar, Jim Lampley, John McEnroe, Soledad O'Brien, Serena Williams, Dolph Lundgren	
J U L Y	17	Ant-Man	Marvel Studios	Peyton Reed (director); Edgar Wright, Joe Cornish, Adam McKay, Paul Rudd (screenplay); Paul Rudd, Evangeline Lilly, Corey Stoll, Bobby Cannavale, Michael Peña, Tip "T.I." Harris, Anthony Mackie, Wood Harris, Judy Greer, David Dastmalchian, Michael Douglas	
J U L Y	17	Trainwreck	Universal Pictures	Judd Apatow (director); Amy Schumer (screenplay); Amy Schumer, Bill Hader, Brie Larson, Colin Quinn, John Cena, Vanessa Bayer, Tilda Swinton, Ezra Miller, LeBron James, Mike Birbiglia	
J U L Y	17	Irrational Man	Sony Pictures Classics	Woody Allen (director/screenplay); Jamie Blackley, Joaquin Phoenix, Parker Posey, Emma Stone	
J U L Y	17	Mr. Holmes	Miramax / Roadside Attractions	Bill Condon (director); Jeffrey Hatcher (screenplay); Ian McKellen, Laura Linney, Hiroyuki Sanada, Milo Parker	
J U L Y	24	Pixels	Columbia Pictures / Happy Madison Productions / 1492 Pictures	Chris Columbus (director); Tim Herlihy, Timothy Dowling (screenplay); Adam Sandler, Kevin James, Michelle Monaghan, Peter Dinklage, Josh Gad, Brian Cox	
J U L Y	24	Southpaw	The Weinstein Company	Antoine Fuqua (director); Kurt Sutter (screenplay); Jake Gyllenhaal, Forest Whitaker, Naomie Harris, Curtis "50 Cent" Jackson, Oona Laurence, Rachel McAdams	
J U L Y	24	Paper Towns	20th Century Fox	Jake Schreier (director); Scott Neustadter, Michael H. Weber (screenplay); Nat Wolff, Cara Delevingne, Halston Sage, Justice Smith, Austin Abrams	
J U L Y	24	The Vatican Tapes	Lionsgate	Mark Neveldine (director); Christopher Borrelli, Michael C. Martin (screenplay); Olivia Taylor Dudley, Michael Peña, Dougray Scott, Djimon Hounsou	
J U L Y	29	Vacation	Warner Bros. Pictures / New Line Cinema / RatPac Entertainment	Jonathan Goldstein, John Francis Daley (director/screenplay); Ed Helms, Christina Applegate, Leslie Mann, Beverly D'Angelo, Chevy Chase	
J U L Y	31	Mission: Impossible – Rogue Nation	Paramount Pictures / Skydance Productions / Bad Robot	Christopher McQuarrie (director/screenplay); Tom Cruise, Jeremy Renner, Simon Pegg, Rebecca Ferguson, Ving Rhames, Sean Harris, Alec Baldwin	
A U G U S T	7	Fantastic Four	20th Century Fox / Marvel Entertainment	Josh Trank (director); Jeremy Slater, Simon Kinberg (screenplay); Miles Teller, Michael B. Jordan, Kate Mara, Jamie Bell, Toby Kebbell	
A U G U S T	7	The Gift	STX Entertainment	Joel Edgerton (director/screenplay); Jason Bateman, Rebecca Hall, Joel Edgerton	
A U G U S T	7	Ricki and the Flash	Tristar Pictures	Jonathan Demme (director); Diablo Cody (screenplay); Meryl Streep, Kevin Kline, Mamie Gummer, Audra McDonald, Sebastian Stan, Rick Springfield	
A U G U S T	14	Straight Outta Compton	Universal Pictures / Legendary Pictures	F. Gary Gray (director); Jonathan Herman, Andrea Berloff (screenplay); O'Shea Jackson Jr., Corey Hawkins, Jason Mitchell, Neil Brown Jr., Aldis Hodge, Paul Giamatti	
A U G U S T	14	The Man from U.N.C.L.E.	Warner Bros. Pictures / RatPac Entertainment	Guy Ritchie (director/screenplay); Lionel Wigram (screenplay); Henry Cavill, Armie Hammer, Alicia Vikander, Elizabeth Debicki, Hugh Grant	
A U G U S T	21	American Ultra	Lionsgate / Likely Story	Nima Nourizadeh (director); Max Landis (screenplay); Jesse Eisenberg, Kristen Stewart, Connie Britton, Topher Grace, John Leguizamo, Bill Pullman, Walton Goggins, Tony Hale	
A U G U S T	21	Hitman: Agent 47	20th Century Fox	Aleksander Bach (director); Skip Woods, Michael Finch (screenplay); Rupert Friend, Hannah Ware, Zachary Quinto, Ciarán Hinds, Thomas Kretschmann, Angelababy	
A U G U S T	21	She's Funny That Way	Clarius Entertainment	Peter Bogdanovich (director/screenplay); Louise Stratten (screenplay); Owen Wilson, Imogen Poots, Kathryn Hahn, Will Forte, Cybill Shepherd, Austin Pendleton, Joanna Lumley, Richard Lewis, Rhys Ifans, Jennifer Aniston	
A U G U S T	26	No Escape	The Weinstein Company	John Erick Dowdle (director/screenplay); Drew Dowdle (screenplay); Owen Wilson, Lake Bell, Sterling Jerins, Claire Geare, Pierce Brosnan	
A U G U S T	28	War Room	TriStar Pictures	Alex Kendrick (director); Alex Kendrick, Stephen Kendrick (screenplay); Alex Kendrick, Priscilla Shirer, T.C. Stallings, Beth Moore, Karen Abercrombie, Alena Pitts	
S E P T E M B E R	4	Before We Go	RADiUS	Chris Evans (director); Ronald Bass, Jen Smolka, Chris Shafer, Paul Vicknair (screenplay); Chris Evans, Alice Eve	
S E P T E M B E R	11	The Visit	Universal Pictures	M. Night Shyamalan (director/screenplay); Olivia DeJonge, Ed Oxenbould, Deanna Dunagan, Peter McRobbie, Kathryn Hahn	
S E P T E M B E R	11	The Perfect Guy	Screen Gems	David M. Rosenthal (director); Tyger Williams (screenplay); Sanaa Lathan, Michael Ealy, Morris Chestnut, Charles S. Dutton, Tess Harper, Kathryn Morris, Rutina Wesley, Holt McCallany	
S E P T E M B E R	11	Sleeping with Other People	IFC Films	Leslye Headland (director/screenplay); Jason Sudeikis, Alison Brie, Adam Scott, Jason Mantzoukas, Natasha Lyonne, Adam Brody, Amanda Peet	
S E P T E M B E R	18	Black Mass	Warner Bros. Pictures / RatPac Entertainment / Cross Creek Pictures	Scott Cooper (director); Mark Mallouk, Jez Butterworth (screenplay); Johnny Depp, Joel Edgerton, Benedict Cumberbatch, Rory Cochrane, Jesse Plemons, Kevin Bacon, Peter Sarsgaard, Dakota Johnson, Corey Stoll	
S E P T E M B E R	18	Captive	Paramount Pictures	Jerry Jameson (director); Brian Bird, Reinhard Denke (screenplay); David Oyelowo, Kate Mara, Michael K. Williams, Leonor Varela, Jessica Oyelowo, Mimi Rogers	
S E P T E M B E R	18	Everest	Universal Pictures / Walden Media / Cross Creek Pictures / Working Title Films	Baltasar Kormákur (director); William Nicholson, Simon Beaufoy (screenplay); Jason Clarke, Josh Brolin, John Hawkes, Robin Wright, Michael Kelly, Sam Worthington, Keira Knightley, Emily Watson, Jake Gyllenhaal	
S E P T E M B E R	18	Maze Runner: The Scorch Trials	20th Century Fox / Temple Hill Entertainment	Wes Ball (director); T. S. Nowlin (screenplay); Dylan O'Brien, Ki Hong Lee, Thomas Sangster, Kaya Scodelario, Patricia Clarkson	
S E P T E M B E R	18	Sicario	Lionsgate	Denis Villeneuve (director); Taylor Sheridan (screenplay); Emily Blunt, Benicio del Toro, Josh Brolin, Victor Garber	
S E P T E M B E R	18	War Pigs	Cinedigm	Ryan Little (director); Luke Schuetzle, Adam Emerson (screenplay); Luke Goss, Dolph Lundgren, Chuck Liddell, Noah Segan, Steven Luke, Mickey Rourke	
S E P T E M B E R	25	Hotel Transylvania 2	Columbia Pictures / Sony Pictures Animation / Media Rights Capital	Genndy Tartakovsky (director); Robert Smigel, Adam Sandler (screenplay); Adam Sandler, Andy Samberg, Selena Gomez, Kevin James, David Spade, Steve Buscemi, Keegan-Michael Key, Molly Shannon, Fran Drescher, Mel Brooks	
S E P T E M B E R	25	99 Homes	Broad Green Pictures	Ramin Bahrani (director/screenplay); Amir Naderi (screenplay); Andrew Garfield, Michael Shannon, Tim Guinee, Laura Dern	
S E P T E M B E R	25	The Intern	Warner Bros. Pictures / RatPac Entertainment	Nancy Meyers (director/screenplay); Robert De Niro, Anne Hathaway, Rene Russo	
S E P T E M B E R	25	Stonewall	Roadside Attractions	Roland Emmerich (director); Jon Robin Baitz (screenplay); Jeremy Irvine, Jonny Beauchamp, Joey King, Caleb Landry Jones, Matt Craven, Jonathan Rhys Meyers, Ron Perlman	
S E P T E M B E R	25	Mississippi Grind	A24	Anna Boden, Ryan Fleck (director/screenplay); Ryan Reynolds, Ben Mendelsohn, Sienna Miller, Analeigh Tipton, Alfre Woodard	
S E P T E M B E R	30	The Walk	TriStar Pictures	Robert Zemeckis (director/screenplay); Christopher Browne (screenplay); Joseph Gordon-Levitt, Ben Kingsley, Charlotte Le Bon, James Badge Dale	

== October–December ==
Opening		Title	Production company	Cast and crew	Ref.
O C T O B E R	2	The Martian	20th Century Fox / Scott Free Productions	Ridley Scott (director); Drew Goddard (screenplay); Matt Damon, Jessica Chastain, Kristen Wiig, Jeff Daniels, Michael Peña, Kate Mara, Sean Bean, Sebastian Stan, Aksel Hennie, Chiwetel Ejiofor, Donald Glover, Mackenzie Davis	
O C T O B E R	2	Freeheld	Summit Entertainment	Peter Sollett (director); Ron Nyswaner (screenplay); Julianne Moore, Elliot Page, Michael Shannon, Steve Carell	
O C T O B E R	9	Steve Jobs	Universal Pictures / Legendary Pictures	Danny Boyle (director); Aaron Sorkin (screenplay); Michael Fassbender, Kate Winslet, Seth Rogen, Jeff Daniels	
O C T O B E R	9	Pan	Warner Bros. Pictures / RatPac Entertainment	Joe Wright (director); Jason Fuchs (screenplay); Hugh Jackman, Garrett Hedlund, Rooney Mara, Levi Miller, Amanda Seyfried	
O C T O B E R	9	Knock Knock	Lionsgate Premiere	Eli Roth (director/screenplay); Nicolás López, Guillermo Amoedo (screenplay); Keanu Reeves, Ana de Armas, Lorenza Izzo, Aaron Burns, Ignacia Allamand, Colleen Camp	
O C T O B E R	16	Beasts of No Nation	Netflix	Cary Joji Fukunaga (director/screenplay); Idris Elba, Kurt Egyiawan, Jude Akuwudike, Emmanuel "King King" Nii Adom Quaye, Abraham Attah	
O C T O B E R	16	Bridge of Spies	Touchstone Pictures / 20th Century Fox / DreamWorks Pictures / Reliance Entertainment / Participant Media / Amblin Entertainment	Steven Spielberg (director); Matt Charman, Ethan Coen, Joel Coen (screenplay); Tom Hanks, Mark Rylance, Amy Ryan, Alan Alda	
O C T O B E R	16	Crimson Peak	Universal Pictures / Legendary Pictures	Guillermo del Toro (director/screenplay); Matthew Robbins (screenplay); Mia Wasikowska, Jessica Chastain, Tom Hiddleston, Charlie Hunnam, Jim Beaver	
O C T O B E R	16	Goosebumps	Columbia Pictures / Sony Pictures Animation / Village Roadshow Pictures / Original Film / Scholastic Entertainment	Rob Letterman (director); Darren Lemke (screenplay); Jack Black, Dylan Minnette, Odeya Rush, Amy Ryan, Ryan Lee, Jillian Bell	
O C T O B E R	16	Room	A24	Lenny Abrahamson (director); Emma Donoghue (screenplay); Brie Larson, Jacob Tremblay, Joan Allen, Sean Bridgers, William H. Macy	
O C T O B E R	16	Woodlawn	Pure Flix Entertainment	Andrew Erwin (director); Jon Erwin (director/screenplay); Quinton Peeples (screenplay); Sean Astin, Nic Bishop, Caleb Castille, Sherri Shepherd, Jon Voight	
O C T O B E R	16	Truth	Sony Pictures Classics / RatPac Entertainment	James Vanderbilt (director/screenplay); Cate Blanchett, Robert Redford, Topher Grace, Elisabeth Moss, Bruce Greenwood, Stacy Keach, Dennis Quaid	
O C T O B E R	16	Experimenter	Magnolia Pictures	Michael Almereyda (director/screenplay); Peter Sarsgaard, Winona Ryder, Jim Gaffigan, Edoardo Ballerini, Kellan Lutz, Dennis Haysbert, Danny A. Abeckaser, Taryn Manning, Anton Yelchin, John Leguizamo	
O C T O B E R	23	Rock the Kasbah	Open Road Films	Barry Levinson (director); Mitch Glazer (screenplay); Bill Murray, Kate Hudson, Zooey Deschanel, Danny McBride, Scott Caan, Leem Lubany, Arian Moayed, Bruce Willis	
O C T O B E R	23	Paranormal Activity: The Ghost Dimension	Paramount Pictures	Gregory Plotkin (director); Jason Harry Pagan, Andrew Deutschman, Adam Robitel, Gavin Heffernan (screenplay); Chris J. Murray, Brittany Shaw, Dan Gill, Ivy Rose George, Olivia Taylor Dudley, Jessica Tyler Brown, Chloe Csengery, Aiden Lovekamp, Hallie Foote, Don McManus, Mark Steger, Michael Krawic	
O C T O B E R	23	Jem and the Holograms	Universal Pictures	Jon M. Chu (director); Ryan Landels (screenplay); Aubrey Peeples, Stefanie Scott, Hayley Kiyoko, Aurora Perrineau, Ryan Guzman, Molly Ringwald, Juliette Lewis	
O C T O B E R	23	The Last Witch Hunter	Summit Entertainment	Breck Eisner (director); Cory Goodman, Matt Sazama, Burk Sharpless (screenplay); Vin Diesel, Elijah Wood, Rose Leslie, Julie Engelbrecht, Michael Caine	
O C T O B E R	23	Bone Tomahawk	RLJ Entertainment	S. Craig Zahler (director/screenplay); Kurt Russell, Patrick Wilson, Matthew Fox, Lili Simmons, Richard Jenkins, Evan Jonigkeit, Kathryn Morris, Sid Haig, David Arquette, Fred Melamed	
O C T O B E R	23	I Smile Back	Broad Green Pictures	Adam Salky (director); Paige Dylan, Amy Koppelman (screenplay); Sarah Silverman, Josh Charles, Thomas Sadoski, Mia Barron, Skylar Gaertner, Shayne Coleman, Kristin Griffith, Chris Sarandon, Terry Kinney	
O C T O B E R	30	Scouts Guide to the Zombie Apocalypse	Paramount Pictures	Christopher Landon (director/screenplay); Carrie Evans, Emi Mochizuki (screenplay); Tye Sheridan, David Koechner	
O C T O B E R	30	Our Brand Is Crisis	Warner Bros. Pictures / Participant Media / RatPac Entertainment / Smokehouse Pictures	David Gordon Green (director); Peter Straughan (screenplay); Sandra Bullock, Billy Bob Thornton, Anthony Mackie, Joaquim de Almeida, Ann Dowd, Scoot McNairy, Zoe Kazan	
O C T O B E R	30	Freaks of Nature	Columbia Pictures	Robbie Pickering (director); Oren Uziel (screenplay); Nicholas Braun, Mackenzie Davis, Josh Fadem, Joan Cusack, Bob Odenkirk, Keegan-Michael Key, Ed Westwick, Patton Oswalt, Vanessa Hudgens, Denis Leary	
O C T O B E R	30	Burnt	The Weinstein Company	John Wells (director); Steven Knight (screenplay); Bradley Cooper, Sienna Miller, Omar Sy, Daniel Brühl, Riccardo Scamarcio, Sam Keeley, Alicia Vikander, Matthew Rhys, Lily James, Uma Thurman, Emma Thompson	
N O V E M B E R	2	The Leisure Class	HBO Films / Adaptive Studios / Pearl Street Films / Miramax	Jason Mann (director/screenplay); Pete Jones (screenplay); Ed Weeks, Tom Bell, Bruce Davison, Brenda Strong, Bridget Regan, Christine Lakin, Scottie Thompson, Rory Knox Johnston, Melanie Zanetti	
N O V E M B E R	6	Spectre	Metro-Goldwyn-Mayer / Columbia Pictures	Sam Mendes (director); John Logan, Neal Purvis, Robert Wade, Jez Butterworth (screenplay); Daniel Craig, Christoph Waltz, Léa Seydoux, Ben Whishaw, Naomie Harris, Dave Bautista, Monica Bellucci, Ralph Fiennes	
N O V E M B E R	6	Spotlight	Open Road Films	Tom McCarthy (director/screenplay); Josh Singer (screenplay); Mark Ruffalo, Michael Keaton, Rachel McAdams, Liev Schreiber, John Slattery, Stanley Tucci	
N O V E M B E R	6	The Peanuts Movie	20th Century Fox / Blue Sky Studios	Steve Martino (director); Craig Schulz, Bryan Schulz, Cornelius Uliano (screenplay); Noah Schnapp, Hadley Belle Miller, Mariel Sheets, Alex Garfin, Francesca Angelucci Capaldi, Troy "Trombone Shorty" Andrews, Kristin Chenoweth, Bill Melendez	
N O V E M B E R	13	The 33	Warner Bros. Pictures / Alcon Entertainment / Phoenix Pictures	Patricia Riggen (director); Mikko Alanne, Craig Borten, Michael Thomas (screenplay); Antonio Banderas, Rodrigo Santoro, Juliette Binoche, James Brolin, Lou Diamond Phillips, Mario Casas, Adriana Barraza, Kate del Castillo, Cote de Pablo, Bob Gunton, Gabriel Byrne	
N O V E M B E R	13	My All American	Clarius Entertainment	Angelo Pizzo (director/screenplay); Aaron Eckhart, Finn Wittrock, Robin Tunney, Sarah Bolger	
N O V E M B E R	13	Love the Coopers	Lionsgate / CBS Films	Jessie Nelson (director); Steven Rogers (screenplay); John Goodman, Diane Keaton, Amanda Seyfried, Alan Arkin, Olivia Wilde, Ed Helms, Marisa Tomei, June Squibb, Dan Amboyer	
N O V E M B E R	13	By the Sea	Universal Pictures	Angelina Jolie (director/screenplay); Brad Pitt, Angelina Jolie	
N O V E M B E R	20	Carol	StudioCanal / The Weinstein Company	Todd Haynes (director); Phyllis Nagy (screenplay); Cate Blanchett, Rooney Mara, Sarah Paulson, Jake Lacy, Kyle Chandler	
N O V E M B E R	20	Legend	Universal Pictures / Cross Creek Pictures / Working Title Films	Brian Helgeland (director/screenplay); Tom Hardy, Emily Browning, Colin Morgan, David Thewlis, Christopher Eccleston, Chazz Palminteri	
N O V E M B E R	20	The Hunger Games: Mockingjay – Part 2	Lionsgate	Francis Lawrence (director); Peter Craig, Danny Strong (screenplay); Jennifer Lawrence, Josh Hutcherson, Liam Hemsworth, Woody Harrelson, Elizabeth Banks, Julianne Moore, Philip Seymour Hoffman, Jeffrey Wright, Stanley Tucci, Donald Sutherland	
N O V E M B E R	20	The Night Before	Columbia Pictures / Good Universe / Point Grey Pictures	Jonathan Levine (director/screenplay); Kyle Hunter, Ariel Shaffir, Evan Goldberg (screenplay); Joseph Gordon-Levitt, Seth Rogen, Anthony Mackie	
N O V E M B E R	25	Creed	Metro-Goldwyn-Mayer / Warner Bros. Pictures / New Line Cinema	Ryan Coogler (director/screenplay); Aaron Covington (screenplay); Michael B. Jordan, Sylvester Stallone, Tessa Thompson, Phylicia Rashad, Anthony Bellew	
N O V E M B E R	25	The Good Dinosaur	Walt Disney Pictures / Pixar Animation Studios	Peter Sohn (director); Meg LeFauve (screenplay); Raymond Ochoa, Jack Bright, Steve Zahn, Sam Elliott, Anna Paquin, A. J. Buckley, Frances McDormand, and Jeffrey Wright	
N O V E M B E R	25	Victor Frankenstein	20th Century Fox / Davis Entertainment	Paul McGuigan (director); Max Landis (screenplay); Daniel Radcliffe, James McAvoy, Jessica Brown Findlay, Andrew Scott, Charles Dance	
D E C E M B E R	4	Krampus	Universal Pictures / Legendary Pictures	Michael Dougherty (director/screenplay); Todd Casey, Zach Shields (screenplay); Adam Scott, Toni Collette, David Koechner, Allison Tolman, Conchata Ferrell, Emjay Anthony, Stefania LaVie Owen, Krista Stadler	
D E C E M B E R	11	In the Heart of the Sea	Warner Bros. Pictures / Village Roadshow Pictures / Imagine Entertainment / Roth Films	Ron Howard (director); Charles Leavitt (screenplay); Chris Hemsworth, Benjamin Walker, Cillian Murphy, Tom Holland, Ben Whishaw, Brendan Gleeson	
D E C E M B E R	11	The Big Short	Paramount Pictures / Regency Enterprises / Plan B Entertainment	Adam McKay (director/screenplay); Charles Randolph (screenplay); Christian Bale, Steve Carell, Ryan Gosling, Brad Pitt	
D E C E M B E R	18	Alvin and the Chipmunks: The Road Chip	20th Century Fox / Regency Enterprises	Walt Becker (director); Randi Mayem Singer, Adam Sztykiel (screenplays); Jason Lee, Tony Hale, Kimberly Williams-Paisley, Josh Green, Bella Thorne, Justin Long, Matthew Gray Gubler, Jesse McCartney, Kaley Cuoco, Anna Faris, Christina Applegate	
D E C E M B E R	18	Star Wars: The Force Awakens	Lucasfilm	J. J. Abrams (director/screenplay); Lawrence Kasdan, Michael Arndt (screenplay); Harrison Ford, Mark Hamill, Carrie Fisher, Adam Driver, Daisy Ridley, John Boyega, Oscar Isaac, Lupita Nyong'o, Andy Serkis, Domhnall Gleeson, Anthony Daniels, Peter Mayhew, Max von Sydow	
D E C E M B E R	18	Sisters	Universal Pictures	Jason Moore (director); Paula Pell (screenplay); Amy Poehler, Tina Fey, John Cena, Maya Rudolph	
D E C E M B E R	18	Extraction	Lionsgate Premiere / Emmett/Furla/Oasis Films	Steven C. Miller (director); Max Adams, Umair Aleem (screenplay); Kellan Lutz, Bruce Willis, Gina Carano, D. B. Sweeney, Dan Bilzerian, Steve Coulter	
D E C E M B E R	25	Concussion	Columbia Pictures / Village Roadshow Pictures / Scott Free Productions	Peter Landesman (director/screenplay); Will Smith, Alec Baldwin, Gugu Mbatha-Raw, Arliss Howard, Paul Reiser, Luke Wilson, Adewale Akinnuoye-Agbaje, David Morse, Albert Brooks	
D E C E M B E R	25	Daddy's Home	Paramount Pictures / Red Granite Pictures / Gary Sanchez Productions	Sean Anders (director/screenplay); Brian Burns, John Morris (screenplay); Will Ferrell, Mark Wahlberg, Linda Cardellini	
D E C E M B E R	25	Joy	20th Century Fox / Annapurna Pictures / Davis Entertainment	David O. Russell (director/screenplay); Jennifer Lawrence, Robert De Niro, Édgar Ramírez, Diane Ladd, Virginia Madsen, Isabella Rossellini, Bradley Cooper	
D E C E M B E R	25	Point Break	Warner Bros. Pictures / Alcon Entertainment	Ericson Core (director); Kurt Wimmer (screenplay); Édgar Ramírez, Luke Bracey, Teresa Palmer, Delroy Lindo, Ray Winstone	
D E C E M B E R	25	The Hateful Eight	The Weinstein Company	Quentin Tarantino (director/screenplay); Samuel L. Jackson, Kurt Russell, Jennifer Jason Leigh, Walton Goggins, Demián Bichir, Tim Roth, Michael Madsen, Bruce Dern, James Parks, Channing Tatum	
D E C E M B E R	25	The Revenant	20th Century Fox / Regency Enterprises / RatPac Entertainment	Alejandro G. Iñárritu (director/screenplay); Mark L. Smith (screenplay); Leonardo DiCaprio, Tom Hardy	
D E C E M B E R	30	Anomalisa	Paramount Pictures / Paramount Animation	Charlie Kaufman, Duke Johnson (directors); David Thewlis, Jennifer Jason Leigh, Tom Noonan	

== See also ==
- 2015 in American television
- 2015 in the United States
