= Speakeasy (2002 film) =

2002 film by Brendan Murphy

- Directed by: Brendan Murphy
- Produced by: Chris Moore; Jeff Balis
- Release date: 2002
- Running time: 86 minutes

Speakeasy is a 2002 film about two men who become unlikely friends after a minor traffic accident. Written and directed by Brendan Murphy, Speakeasy was a runner-up to become the first movie produced for Project Greenlight, a documentary series about the making of an independent film. After Pete Jones's Stolen Summer was chosen for Project Greenlight instead, the show's founders, LivePlanet and Miramax, decided to produce Speakeasy apart from the documentary series.

== Cast ==
- David Strathairn as Bruce Hickman
- Nicky Katt as Frank Marnikov
- Stacy Edwards as Sophie Hickman
- Arthur Hiller as Mr. Prappas
- Lake Bell as Sara Marnikov
- Christopher McDonald as Dr. Addams

== Reception ==
Critic David Nusair gave it 2 out of 4.

== See also ==
- List of films featuring the deaf and hard of hearing
