= List of Balls of Steel episodes =

Balls of Steel is a British television comedy game show that aired on Channel 4 from 19 August 2005 to 25 April 2008. Presented by Mark Dolan, the programme features a cast of recurring performers who stage hidden-camera pranks, confrontational stunts and comedic challenges with most involving members of the public or celebrities. These are recorded beforehand and the played to a studio audience who vote at the end of each episode to decide the winning performer. In total 19 episodes were broadcast across three series.

== Series overview ==
Series	Episodes	Originally released	
Series	Episodes	First released	Last released
1	7	19 August 2005	30 September 2005
2	6	16 February 2007	23 March 2007
3	6	21 March 2008	25 April 2008

== Episodes ==
=== Series 1 (2005) ===
No. overall	No. in series	Performers (in order of appearance)	Winner(s)	Original release date
1	1	Alex Zane; The Annoying Devil; Neg Dupree; The Pain Men; Olivia Lee; Randy Cambell	Alex Zane	19 August 2005
2	2	The Annoying Devil; Toju – The Militant Black Guy; Alex Zane; The Big Gay Following; The Man Tester; Randy Cambell	The Annoying Devil	26 August 2005
3	3	Olivia Lee; Neg Dupree; The Annoying Devil; The Bunny Boiler; Ross Lee – The World's Worst; The Pain Men	The Pain Men	2 September 2005
4	4	Alex Zane; Toju – The Militant Black Guy; The Naked Man; Olivia Lee; The Man Tester; Randy Cambell	Toju – The Militant Black Guy	9 September 2005 (Note: This episode has since been banned from airing and removed from Channel 4 Streaming, due to controversy over practical jokes played on Tom Cruise and Sharon Osbourne.)
5	5	The Annoying Devil; The Bunny Boiler; The Pain Men; Alex Zane; Neg Dupree; Ross Lee – The World's Worst	The Bunny Boiler	16 September 2005
6	6	Olivia Lee; The Big Gay Following; Alex Zane; The Bunny Boiler; The Naked Man; Randy Cambell	Olivia Lee	23 September 2005
7	7	The Annoying Devil; Olivia Lee; Alex Zane; The Pain Men; The Man Tester; Randy Cambell	The Annoying Devil	30 September 2005

=== Series 2 (2007) ===
No. overall	No. in series	Performers (in order of appearance)	Winner(s)	Original release date
8	1	Alex Zane; Neg Dupree; The Annoying Devil; Olivia Lee; The Pain Men; The Fuckers	Neg Dupree	16 February 2007
9	2	The Big Gay Following; Alex Zane; The Bunny Boiler; Neg Dupree; Toju – The Militant Black Guy; Mr. Inappropriate	The Big Gay Following	23 February 2007
10	3	Alex Zane; The Big Gay Following; Neg Dupree; Olivia Lee; The Pain Men; Toju – The Militant Black Guy	Toju – The Militant Black Guy	2 March 2007
11	4	The Annoying Devil; Neg Dupree; Alex Zane; The Bunny Boiler; The Fuckers; The Escapologist	The Fuckers	9 March 2007
12	5	Mr. Inappropriate; Olivia Lee; The Annoying Devil; The Pain Men; The Big Gay Following; Toju – The Militant Black Guy	Olivia Lee	16 March 2007
13	6	Alex Zane; Neg Dupree; The Annoying Devil; Penis Fly Trap; The Pain Men; The Fuckers	The Annoying Devil	23 March 2007

=== Series 3 (2008) ===
No. overall	No. in series	Performers (in order of appearance)	Winner(s)	Original release date
14	1	Alex Zane; Neg Dupree; Scummy Mummy; Big Gay Following; Olivia Lee; The Bunny Boiler	Big Gay Following	21 March 2008
15	2	The Annoying Devil; Olivia Lee; Alex Zane; Neg Dupree; The Pain Men; Mr. Inappropriate	Mr. Inappropriate	28 March 2008
16	3	The Bunny Boiler; Knob Jockey; The Annoying Devil; Toju – The Militant Black Guy; Scummy Mummy; Neg Dupree	The Annoying Devil	4 April 2008
17	4	Alex Zane; Big Gay Following; Olivia Lee; The Pain Men; The Annoying Devil; Mr. Inappropriate	The Pain Men	11 April 2008
18	5	Alex Zane; Scummy Mummy; Neg Dupree; The Bastard in Black; Toju – The Militant Black Guy; Mr. Inappropriate	Alex Zane	18 April 2008
19	6	The Bunny Boiler; Big Gay Following; The Annoying Devil; The Pain Men; Neg Dupree; Alex Zane	The Pain Men	25 April 2008
