= Tom Bell (comedy actor) =

British actor

Tom Bell (born 8 January 1981 in Nottingham) is an English comedy actor, and a creature and droid performer in the Star Wars franchise.

He has played a range of roles in the topical BBC comedy show The Mash Report and its Dave continuation Late Night Mash, portrayed the recurring character Jathro in Wizards vs Aliens and played Ubdurian alien Prashee in Star Wars: Episode VII - The Force Awakens. He played Deputy NSA Flower in Digger

== Career ==
He began his career as one half of the sketch duo Tommy and the Weeks opposite Ed Weeks. Weeks was president of Cambridge Footlights while Bell was vice-president. Other work includes a long-running series of adverts as one of the 118 118 men, shows on community arts radio station Resonance FM, Lord Fear in the stage production Knightmare Live, numerous appearances with The Alternative Comedy Memorial Society and the one-man show Tom Bell Begins.

He appeared as himself in the fourth season of the Matt Damon and Ben Affleck reality series Project Greenlight, charting the developing of the HBO film The Leisure Class in which Bell stars with Weeks.

More recently Tom starred in the Alejandro G Iñárritu movie Digger as well as becoming a familiar face in BBC Comedy shows, most notably as recurring cast member Alasdair Moss in two series of Black Ops

== Selected filmography ==
=== Film ===
- Star Wars: Episode VII - The Force Awakens (2015) – creature and droid puppeteer
- Digger (2026) - Deputy NSA Flower
- The Leisure Class (2015) – Leonard
- The Current War (2016) – Reverend Vincent
- Solo: A Star Wars Story (2018) – creature and droid puppeteer
- The Aftermath (2019) – Captain Eliot
- A Guide to Second Date Sex (2019) – Adam

=== Television ===
- Nolly (2023) – Rodney
- Dick and Dom's Funny Business (2011) – various
- Wizards vs Aliens (2012-2014) – Jathro
- Anna & Katy (2013) – various
- Big Bad World (2013) – Jerome
- Ludus (2014-2015) - Ludus
- Horrible Science (2015) – Bob
- Project Greenlight – himself
- Doctor Thorne (2016) – Lord Porlock
- American Dad! (2016) – Portrait Painter
- Ill Behaviour (2017) – Andrew
- Bromans (2017) – Dominus
- Lovesick (2018) – Ben
- Press (2018) – Jon Brooks
- The Mash Report (2018-2020) – various
- Harlots (2019) – Mr Bradley
- This Way Up (2019) – David
- Murder, They Hope (2021) – Barry
- Late Night Mash (2021) – various
