= LivePlanet =

Production company

- Industry: Film and television production
- Predecessor: Pearl Street Productions
- Founded: 2000; 26 years ago
- Founder: Ben Affleck; Matt Damon; Chris Moore; Sean Bailey
- Defunct: 2008
- Successor: Pearl Street Films
- Headquarters: Los Angeles, California, United States
- Products: Motion pictures and television series
- Website: liveplanet.net

LivePlanet was a production company founded in 2000, and was known for television and new media platforms.

== History ==
It was created by Ben Affleck, Matt Damon, Chris Moore and Sean Bailey in 2000, supplanting Affleck and Damon's previous production company at Miramax, Pearl Street Productions, as well as Sean Bailey with Horsepower Entertainment and Chris Moore with Fusion Studios, which was also affiliated with Miramax.

The new company aimed at the digital and Internet technology. The company was funded by Redpoint Ventures and Accel Partners. David Haddad was hired as its first president in 2001.

The company's first project was The Runner, for ABC, which was cancelled before airing an episode. The company's next project was Project Greenlight, in collaboration with Miramax Television, for HBO and Bravo, which went on to have a successful run. It was followed by Push, Nevada, for ABC, but it flopped after a few episodes.

In 2002, the company signed a first-look deal with The Walt Disney Studios. Chris Moore left the company in 2005 to revive the previous production company Fusion Studios, citing his desire for film directing.

Affleck and Damon ended their film production deal in late 2007, and Bailey disassociated in 2008 to form Ideology Inc., his own film production company for The Walt Disney Company. Damon and Affleck went on to relaunch Pearl Street in 2010 for Warner Bros. Pictures, which was supplanted by Artists Equity in 2022.

== Filmography ==
- American Pie 2 (2001)
- Joy Ride (2001)
- Project Greenlight (2001)
- Push, Nevada (2002) (TV)
- The Emperor's Club (2002)
- Third Wheel (2002)
- Speakeasy (2002)
- Stolen Summer (2002)
- Matchstick Men (2003)
- The Battle of Shaker Heights (2003)
- American Wedding (2003)
- Project Greenlight 2 (2003)
- The Core (2003)
- Surviving Christmas (2004)
- Tricks of the Trade: Making 'Matchstick Men (2004) (Documentary)
- Feast (2005)
- Project Greenlight 3 (2005)
- The Entertainer (TV show) (2005) (Reality show)
- Fan Club: Reality Baseball (2006)
- Gears of War: The Race to E3 (2006) (Made for TV movie)
- Gone Baby Gone (2007)
- Finish Our Movie (2007)
- Running the Sahara (2007)

== Released though Sean Bailey's film studio Ideology Inc. ==
- Tron: Legacy (2010) (with Walt Disney Pictures)
