= Sean Bailey =

American film and television producer

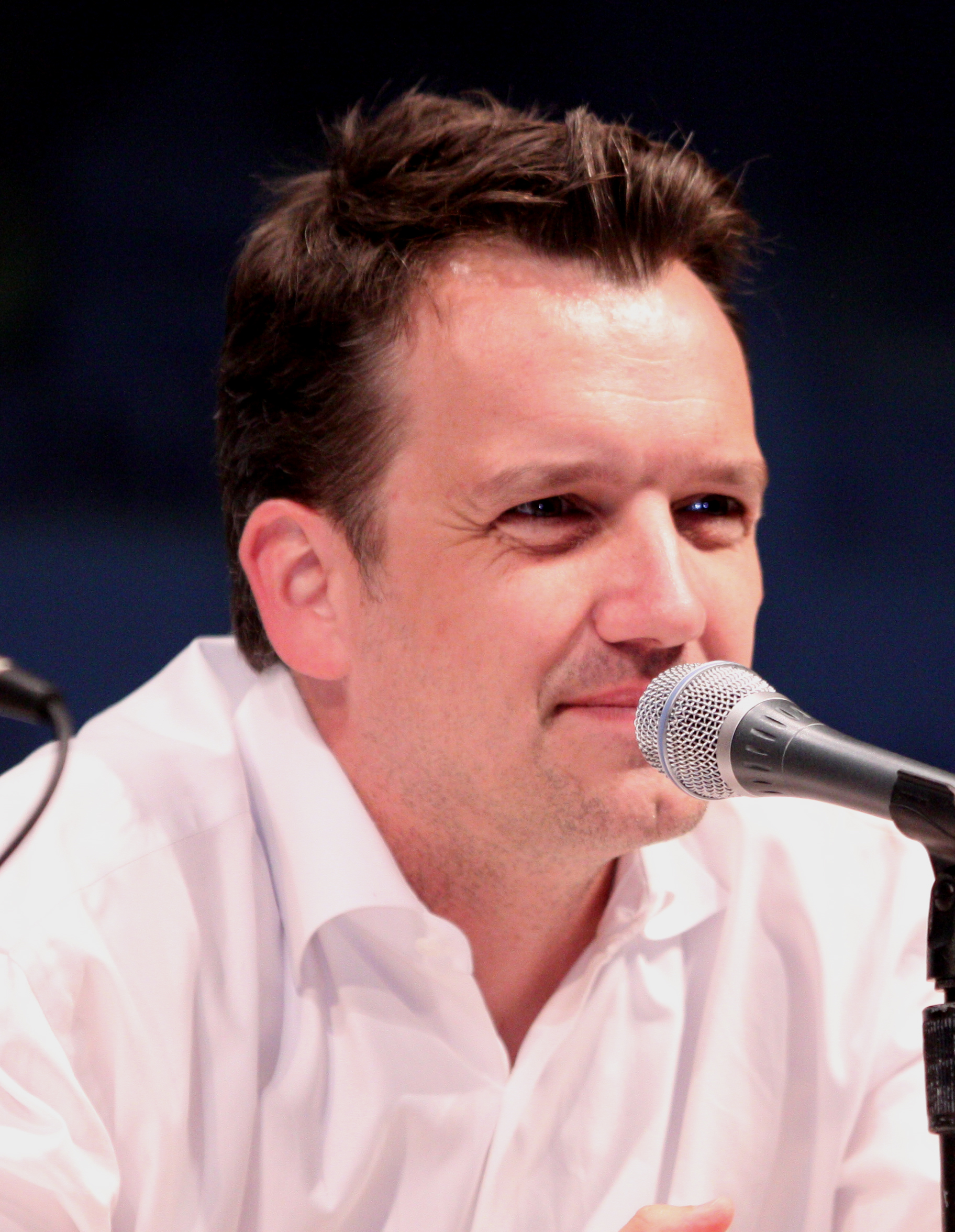
- Bailey at San Diego Comic-Con in July 2010
- Occupations: Film and television producer, media executive, entrepreneur
- Years active: 1998–present
- Title: Founder & CEO of B5 Studios (2025-present); President of Walt Disney Studios Motion Picture Production (2010–2024)
- Spouse: Charmaine Bailey
- Children: 2
- Parent(s): Jay Bailey (father); Mary K. Bailey (mother); Frances Arnold (former step-mother)

Sean Bailey is an American film and television producer who founded B5 Studios in 2025 and serves as its CEO. He was president of Walt Disney Pictures from 2010 to 2024.

== Career ==
=== LivePlanet and early multimedia ventures ===
In 1994, he co-founded a company Horsepower Entertainment, with Cooper Layne, and packaged properties, but it dissolved in 2000.

In the early 2000s, Bailey co-founded LivePlanet with Ben Affleck, Matt Damon, and Chris Moore. The company was venture-backed by Redpoint Ventures and Accel Partners.

Bailey and Affleck co-created Push, Nevada, and the company's projects included the Emmy Award-nominated Project Greenlight. LivePlanet also produced General Manager, one of the first original entertainment projects commissioned for the MSN web portal, which featured fans running a real-world sports team, The Schaumburg Flyers, through the internet. Bailey also produced the films The Emperor's Club, Best Laid Plans, Matchstick Men, and Gone Baby Gone.

From 2004 to 2008, Bailey was chairman of LivePlanet while partnering with The Walt Disney Company to launch Ideology Inc, which produced Tron: Legacy, the sequel to the 1982 film Tron. Bailey also oversaw the platinum-selling Daft Punk soundtrack for Tron: Legacy and contributed to the creation of Tron Lightcycle Power Run, now a major attraction at Shanghai Disneyland and Walt Disney World’s Magic Kingdom.

Bailey also co-wrote (with Ted Griffin) the original screenplay for the 2016 film Solace, starring Anthony Hopkins, Colin Farrell, and Jeffrey Dean Morgan.

=== Walt Disney Studios ===
In January 2010, Bailey was named president of Walt Disney Studios Motion Pictures Production, overseeing all live-action development, production, and operations for Walt Disney Pictures.

Under Bailey, Disney pursued a tentpole film strategy, which included an expanded slate of large-budget films, including franchise sequels, original films, and live-action adaptations of their animated films. The studio found success with the latter type of films, which began with the commercial success of Alice in Wonderland (2010), and continued with Maleficent (2014), Cinderella (2015), The Jungle Book (2016), Beauty and the Beast (2017), Aladdin (2019), The Lion King (2019), and The Little Mermaid (2023). Bailey has overseen the release of five films that have surpassed $1 billion in global box office, making Disney the top-grossing studio worldwide for multiple consecutive years: Alice in Wonderland, Pirates of the Caribbean: On Stranger Tides, Beauty and the Beast, and Aladdin, as well as The Lion King, which earned nearly $1.7 billion worldwide. The division has also produced reimaginings of other fairy-tale and classic stories such as Oz The Great and Powerful (2013), Into the Woods (2014), and Cruella. Despite the renewed focus on tentpole films, the studio continued to produce smaller, "brand-deposit" films, such as The Muppets (2011) and Saving Mr. Banks (2013), a period drama which was the first time the studio had depicted its namesake co-founder onscreen.

Bailey was also part of the launch team for Disney's streaming service Disney+ in November 2019, helping oversee the initial deployment and content strategy for the platform. Under his supervision, the studio's early slate of originals included Lady and the Tramp, Timmy Failure: Mistakes Were Made, Stargirl, Togo, Rise, Hocus Pocus 2, Enchanted follow-up Disenchanted, and Peter Pan & Wendy.

Bailey is noted for transforming Disney's live-action film slate with female-led tentpoles featuring empowered, contemporary heroines and expanding representation in these roles. Notable examples include Halle Bailey as Ariel in The Little Mermaid, Yara Shahidi as Tinker Bell in Peter Pan & Wendy, Storm Reid in A Wrinkle in Time, and Rachel Zegler as Snow White in the studio's 2025 live-action reimagining of the Disney film. Throughout his tenure, he has also championed female directors for major projects, including Ava DuVernay, Mira Nair, and Julia Hart.

On February 26, 2024, Bailey stepped down as president and was replaced by David Greenbaum, who formerly co-led Searchlight Pictures. Bailey remains a producer and executive music producer for Tron: Ares, featuring a soundtrack by Nine Inch Nails.

=== B5 Studios ===
On October 28, 2025, Bailey launched B5 Studios, described as an innovative studio designed to empower creatives with cutting-edge technology to create premium content across film, television, and emerging formats. Bailey serves as Founder and CEO of B5, which is backed by RedBird Capital Partners. B5’s executive team also includes producers Justin Springer and Jeff Silver, as Head of Creative and Head of Production, respectively. The company’s Advisory Board consists of Ed Catmull, Pixar Co-founder and former President of Pixar and Disney Animation; Jason Blum, producer and Blumhouse Founder & CEO; Dr. Maneesh Agrawala, Stanford professor and Director of Stanford’s Brown Institute for Media Innovation; Dr. Georgia Gkioxari, Caltech professor and Meta AI researcher; Yair Landau, former Sony Pictures Vice Chair and former Partner at MK Capital; Doug Shapiro, Senior Advisor at Boston Consulting Group and former Chief Strategy Officer for Turner; and Kareem Daniel, Executive Advisor at KKR & Co. and Former Chairman of Disney Media and Entertainment Distribution.

B5 launched with an array of relationships, including multiple R&D projects with Meta, along with several active content projects with top creatives.

== Board membership and affiliations ==
In 2012, Bailey was named to the board of Sundance Institute, where he is vice chair. In 2015, he joined the Board of Trustees at Caltech and its JPL Committee. In 2025, it was announced that Bailey is on the board of SNK Studios, a new film, television, and live events studio backed by MiSK Group, SNK, and MBC Group, and led by Erik Feig as CEO.

== Other ventures ==
Bailey is a founding investor of Teremana Tequila, founded by Dwayne "The Rock" Johnson.

== Personal life ==
Bailey is the son of Jay Bailey, a biochemical engineer and professor at California Institute of Technology, and Mary K. Bailey. For a time, he was the stepson of Frances Arnold, a biochemical engineer, California Institute of Technology faculty member, and Nobel Laureate. He attended the University of Colorado Boulder from 1987 to 1991. Bailey is married to Charmaine Bailey, and they have two children.
