= Dirty Sexy Funny =

- Genre: Comedy
- Directed by: Chris Faith
- Starring: Olivia Lee; Ed Weeks; Henry Lloyd-Hughes; Tom Price; Spencer Jones
- Country of origin: United Kingdom
- Original language: English
- No. of series: 2
- No. of episodes: 16

Production
- Executive producers: Clive Tulloh, Howard Davidson
- Producer: Piers Torday
- Production location: London
- Production company: Tiger Aspect Productions

Original release
- Network: Comedy Central
- Release: 8 March 2010

Dirty Sexy Funny is a British television comedy series which first aired in March 2010 on the Comedy Central channel. It stars Olivia Lee. On the show, Lee takes on an array of personas which include a woman with obsessive-compulsive disorder who is interviewing potential flatmates for her apartment; a nightclub promotions girl who cordons off public walkways, preventing pedestrians from accessing it and professes to them that the walkway leads to a nightclub; a temp on her first day in the office who always uses a loud pencil sharpener and keeps asking "Is everything alright?" and a mother who returns 'faulty electrical equipment' to a shop and complains that they don't work. The items in question are plays on words. For example, in the first episode, she takes a live white mouse to the shop as opposed to a computer mouse. Another of her characters is Miss Single, a delusional histrionic who attaches herself to men she has never met before, in each case claiming to be in a relationship with him.

It was originally to be aired in October 2009, but was aired on 8 March 2010.

In 2012, Lee joined the cast of Balls of Steel Australia's second series where she plays a similar role.

== Episodes ==
Series 1:
Episode 1 (Broadcast 8 March 2010)
Episode 2 (Broadcast 15 March 2010)
Episode 3 (Broadcast 22 March 2010)
Episode 4 (Broadcast 29 March 2010)
Episode 5 (Broadcast 5 April 2010)
Episode 6 (Broadcast 12 April 2010)
Episode 7 (Broadcast 12 April 2010)
Episode 8 (Broadcast 30 April 2010)

Series 2:
Episode 1 (Broadcast 28 March 2011)
Episode 2 (Broadcast 4 April 2011)
Episode 3 (Broadcast 11 April 2011)
Episode 4 (Broadcast 18 April 2011)
Episode 5 (Broadcast 25 April 2011)
Episode 6 (Broadcast 2 May 2011)
Episode 7 (Broadcast 9 May 2011)
Episode 8 (Broadcast 16 May 2011, this episode is a collection of sketches featured in the previous 7 episodes)
