= Neg Dupree =

British comedian, writer and actor

- Born: 1 September 1979 (age 46); London, United Kingdom
- Other name: The Urban Cowboy
- Years active: 2004 – present
- Website: www.negdupree.com

Neg Dupree (/ˈnɛdʒ/ NEJ; London, England) is a British comedian, writer and actor, best known for his act "Neg's Urban Sports" on the British television show Balls of Steel. Dupree has also appeared on shows such as Footballers' Wives, EastEnders, and The Bill.

== Neg's Urban Sports ==
The entrance music for Dupree is "Sound of da Police" by KRS-One. While performing the "Urban Sports", he often shouts "Whoop Whoop!". People have mistaken this as coming from the same song. However, it is Dupree's own "catchphrase" from many years back, and in some episodes, Dupree entered to the song "I Predict a Riot" by Kaiser Chiefs. At the beginning of each clip, "Monstertruckdriver" by T. Raumschmiere and "A Fistful of Dollars" by Ennio Morricone are played.

== Television ==
Year	Show
2004	Experimental (Radar TV)
2005	Mike Bassett: Manager
2005	Bleak House
2005	Footballers' Wives
2005	The Greatest TV Wind-Up Moments
2005 – 2008	Balls of Steel
2005 – 2006	EastEnders
2005 – 2006	The Bill
2006	Totally Frank
2006	Footballers' Wives: Extra Time
2006	Snuff Box
2006	Hotel Babylon
2007	Roman's Empire
2007	Holby Blue
2007	Queen
2008	Love Soup
2008	The Kevin Bishop Show
2008	The Wrong Door
2008	My Zinc Bed
2008	The Wall
2009	Frequently Asked Questions About Time Travel
2009	The Tomb Robbery Papyrus: Notes Of A Past
2009	20 to 1 Pranks and Pranksters (Aus) (Urban Sports featured)
2010 – 2011	The Neg Project USA
2011 – 2012	Balls of Steel (Australia)
2015 – 2016	Sam Delaney's News Thing
2016	Betty White's Off Their Rockers

- Reference for television

== See also ==
- Balls of Steel (TV series)
