= Imaan Hadchiti =

Australian comedian and actor

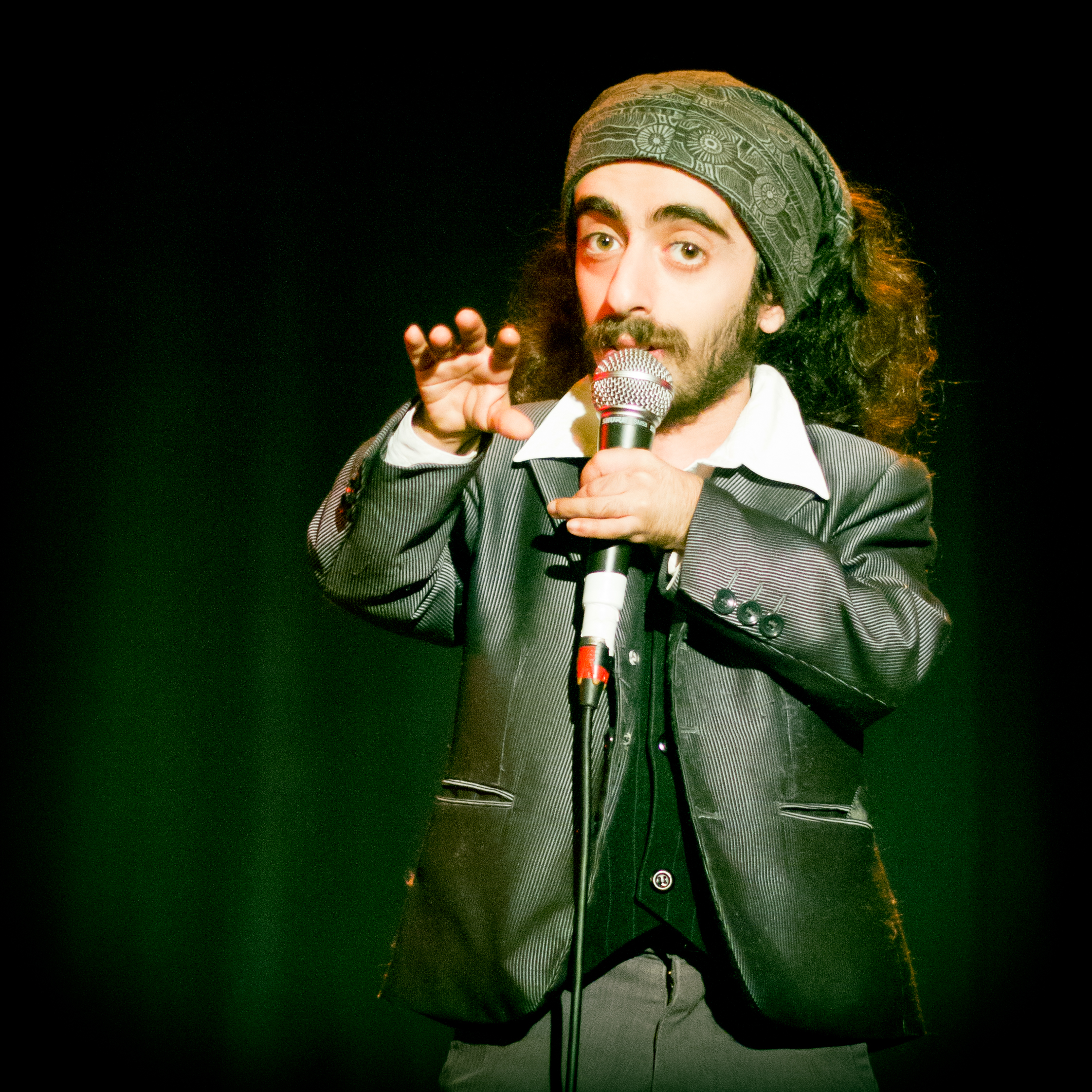
Hadchiti from 2012, by Seth McAnespie

Imaan Hadchiti is an Australian comedian and actor of Lebanese descent. Born in Mylor, South Australia, in 1989 or 1990, Hadchiti and his sister Rima Hadchiti are the only two known cases of "Rima Syndrome", a genetic condition causing small stature yet retaining typical body proportions. Hadchiti is 107 cm (3 ft 6 in) tall, and many of his comedy routines focus on the way people of average stature react to him. Starting his stand-up career at the age of 15, he won Triple J's Class Clown comedy contest in 2005, and has since performed on The NRL Footy Show, the Adelaide Fringe Festival and the Melbourne International Comedy Festival.

Hadchiti's first television role was a possum in the SBS series Wilfred.

Hadchiti has his name in Guinness Book of World Records for being the shortest full-time stand-up comedian.

In 2019 he participated in "Battute?" an italian comedy show created by RAI

In January 2012, he joined the cast of series 2 of Balls of Steel Australia where he stars as the "Short Tempered", reprising his comedic role.

He also performed at Edinburgh Fringe Festival 2019.

In 2022, he played the part of a Mayan God in Thor: Love and Thunder.

In 2024, he played Sergeant Lewis in the TV series Time Bandits.
