= Pearl Street Films =

American film production company

- Type: Private
- Industry: Film and television production
- Predecessor: LivePlanet
- Founded: 1996; 30 years ago (original); 2010; 16 years ago (relaunch)
- Founder: Ben Affleck; Matt Damon
- Defunct: 2000; 26 years ago (original); 2022; 4 years ago (relaunch)
- Successor: Artists Equity
- Headquarters: Warner Bros. Studios, Burbank, California, United States
- Key people: Chay Carter; Jennifer Todd (president)
- Products: Motion pictures and television series

Pearl Street Films was an American film and television production company based at Warner Bros. Studios.

== History ==
The original Pearl Street Productions was established in 1996 by Ben Affleck and Matt Damon with a first-look deal at Miramax Films, during the production of the duo's film, Good Will Hunting. The company is named after the street that ran between their Cambridge homes.

The company was folded in 2000 after the founders focused on their new independent production company, LivePlanet, which shuttered in 2008.

Ben Affleck and Matt Damon re-established the company in 2010 with a first-look deal with Warner Bros. Pictures, and Jennifer Todd became a president in October 2012.

In March 2018, the company announced that it would adopt inclusion riders for all future projects.

The company was dissolved in November 2022 as Affleck and Damon focused on founding their independent production company, Artists Equity.

== Filmography ==
=== Film ===
Year	Film	Director	Distributor	RT	Notes
2012	Promised Land	Gus Van Sant	Focus Features	52%	First film produced.
2015	The Leisure Class	Jason Mann	HBO Films	0%	
2016	Manchester by the Sea	Kenneth Lonergan	Amazon Studios / Roadside Attractions	96%	Nominated for Best Picture.
2016	Jason Bourne	Paul Greengrass	Universal Studios	55%	Installment of the Bourne film series.
2016	Live by Night	Ben Affleck	Warner Bros. Pictures	35%	Based on the novel of the same name.
2021	The Last Duel	Ridley Scott	20th Century Studios	86%	Based on the novel of the same name.

=== Television ===
Year	Series	Creator(s)	Distributor	RT	Notes
2001–2005; 2015	Project Greenlight	Alex Keledjian	HBO	—N/a	First produced television series.
2016	Incorporated	David and Alex Pastor	CBS Television Distribution	75%	Canceled on February 27, 2017.
2016	The Runner	Ben Affleck and Matt Damon	Go90	—N/a	Cancelled
2019-2022	City on a Hill	Charlie McLean	Showtime	73%	Ended
2024	We Were the Lucky Ones	Erica Lipez	Hulu		

== Accolades ==
Pearl Street Films has received numerous nominations and awards for their productions.

Year	Title	Award	Category	Result	Ref(s)
2002	Project Greenlight	Primetime Emmy Award	Outstanding Non-Fiction Program (Reality)	Nominated	
2004	Project Greenlight	Primetime Emmy Award	Outstanding Reality Program	Nominated	
2005	Project Greenlight	Primetime Emmy Award	Outstanding Reality Program	Nominated	
2012	Promised Land	National Board of Review	Top Films	Won	
2012	Promised Land	National Board of Review	Freedom of Expression Award	Won	
2013	Promised Land	Berlin Film Festival	Golden Bear	Nominated	
2013	Promised Land	Young Artist Awards	Best Performance in a Feature Film - Supporting Young Actress Ten and Under	Nominated	
2013	Promised Land	Environmental Media Awards	Ongoing Commitment Award	Won	
2013	Promised Land	Environmental Media Awards	Feature Film Award	Won	
2016	Project Greenlight	Primetime Emmy Award	Outstanding Unstructured Reality Program	Nominated	
2016	Jason Bourne	Critics' Choice Awards	Best Action Movie	Nominated	
2016	Jason Bourne	Critics' Choice Awards	Best Actor in an Action Movie	Nominated	
2017	Incorporated	Saturn Awards	Best Science Fiction Television Series	Nominated	
