= Effie T. Brown =

American film producer

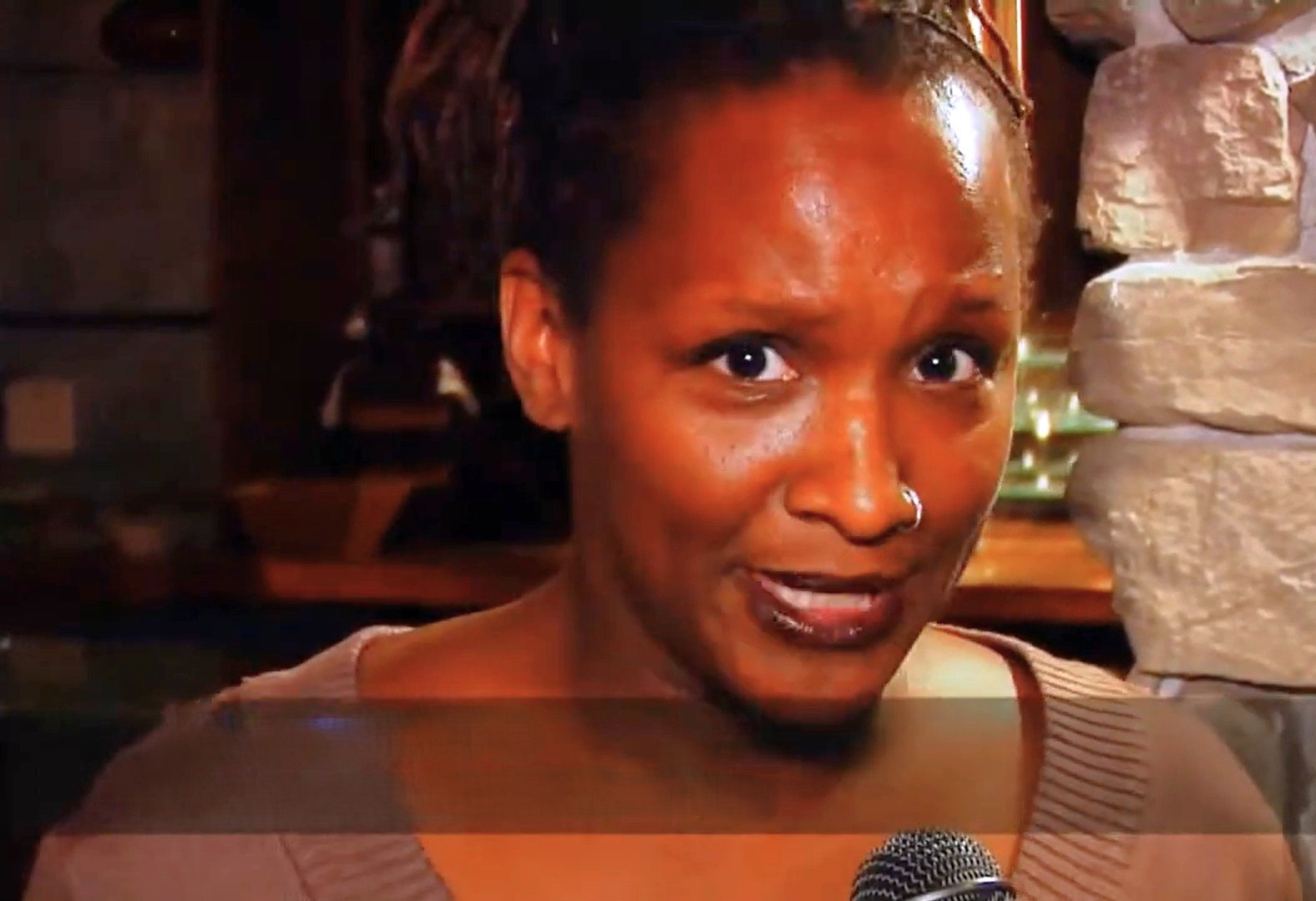
- Brown in 2014
- Born: United States
- Education: Loyola Marymount University
- Occupation: Film producer

Effie T. Brown is a film and television producer known for such films as Rocket Science, Real Women Have Curves, Everyday People, Desert Blue, Dear White People, and But I'm a Cheerleader. She is seen in the fourth season of Project Greenlight as a producer on that season's film project The Leisure Class.

== Background ==
Effie Brown grew up in the greater Los Angeles area. She attended the all-girls St. Lucy's Priory High School in Glendora, California. She received a degree in film production from Loyola Marymount University (LMU) in Los Angeles.

Upon graduation from LMU, Brown quickly rose up in the ranks in the film industry to become Director of Development for Tim Burton's production company in 1995. A few years later, she became one of the first participants in Project:Involve, a fellowship program sponsored by the Independent Feature Project/Los Angeles (now Film Independent). She completed the program in 1999 and with numerous feature films and television productions to her credit, Brown has become one of Project:Involve's major success stories.

== Project Greenlight controversy ==
In the fourth-season premiere of Project Greenlight, Effie Brown, along with director Peter Farrelly and actors Matt Damon and Ben Affleck, met to decide which filmmakers would be chosen to direct a feature film for the show. Among the finalists considered were a directing team of an Asian American man, Leo Angelos, and a white woman, Kristen Brancaccio. Effie Brown expressed her support of this team, stating that "I would just urge people to think about whoever this director is, the way that they're going to treat the character of Harmony, her being a prostitute," Brown counters. "[She's] the only black person, being a hooker who gets hit by her white pimp." Damon responded that "when you're talking about diversity, you do it in the casting of the film, not the casting of the show. He also pointed out that the most diverse directorial candidate didn’t have a problem with the parts of the script that Effie deemed problematic." Critics of Damon's comments stated that he was "mansplaining" and "whitesplaining" diversity to Effie Brown and accused him of being racially tone deaf.

=== Selected filmography ===
- Desert Blue (1998), line producer
- But I'm A Cheerleader (1999), line producer
- Things You Can Tell Just by Looking at Her (2000), line producer
- Stranger Inside (2001), producer
- Real Women Have Curves (2002), producer
- In the Cut (2003), executive producer
- Everyday People (2004), producer
- Rocket Science (2007), producer
- Dear White People (2014), producer
- The Inspection (2022), producer

== Awards and recognition ==
- Distinguished Young Alumni Award, Loyola Marymount University
- Motorola Producer's Award, Film Independent Spirit Awards
