= Balls of Steel Australia =

Australian reality comedy TV series

- Genre: Reality; Sketch comedy
- Presented by: Craig Reucassel
- Theme music composer: Michael Lira
- Country of origin: Australia
- Original language: English
- No. of seasons: 2
- No. of episodes: 20

Production
- Executive producers: Darren Chau (The Comedy Channel); Courtney Gibson; Johnny Lowry
- Running time: 30 minutes (with commercials)
- Production company: Southern Star Entertainment

Original release
- Network: The Comedy Channel; Comedy Central
- Release: 19 April 2011 – 2 April 2012

Related
- Balls of Steel (UK)

Balls of Steel Australia is an Australian reality sketch comedy television series (based upon the UK series of the same name) which is hosted by The Chaser's Craig Reucassel. The show revolves around comedians who appear and present individual skits where they would perform stunts and hold their nerve during hidden camera set-ups in the presence of the Australian public.

The format was acquired, commissioned and developed by The Comedy Channel Group Programming Director Darren Chau who selected Southern Star Entertainment to produce it. Balls of Steel Australia premiered on the Australian subscription television channel The Comedy Channel on 19 April 2011. Ten episodes were produced for the inaugural season. Due to the success of series one, which became The Comedy Channel's highest ever rating series, a second series was commissioned, and premiered on 31 January 2012. The show won an Astra Award.

== Overview ==
During the course of each episode, four acts are presented by their corresponding comedian. Each comedian has a brief banter with host Reucassel before and after each skit. At the end of each episode the studio audience is asked to decide which act had the biggest 'Balls of Steel' by voting with their mobile phones.

Series one initially started with ten different comedians and their corresponding acts. Neg Dupree reprises his role with the Urban Sports segment from the original UK version. The series also has Australian local versions of "The Annoying Devil" and "Bunny Boiler". It also featured many exclusive acts only seen on this version of the show though some take in similar ideas and formats from many previous acts from the UK version. In addition, a studio based segment called "Show Us Your Balls" was created, where people in the audience are asked to participate and will be competing among the other comedians of the show. This segment is presented by host Reucassel.

Series two sees some changes to the line up of comedians and their acts. Katia Taylor will not return to reprise her role as "Nude Girl" but instead will be replaced by the "Nude Twins". Other comedians who didn't return were Janis McGavin and Rachael Coopes. John Burgess replaces James Kerley as "The Game Show Host from Hell". New comedians and acts for this series includes Olivia Lee from the original UK series, "The Misfits Stunt Crew" and Imaan Hadchiti as "Short Tempered". Returning acts include the "Bunny Boiler", "Very Foreign Correspondent", "Neg's Urban Sports Down Under", and "Just Come Out".

== Performers and acts ==
Season(s)	Segment name	Act premise	Performer(s)
1	The Annoying Devil	Wears a devil costume and annoys the general public in various ways. His pranks include disrupting people's work or leisure activities (e.g. urinating in beach waters while people are swimming). He sometimes brings his "little devil" son to help him.	John Burgess
1, 2	Bunny Boiler	An attractive blonde bombshell who takes on various jobs as a disguise such as a photographer, personal fitness trainer or an ice cream seller in order to provoke women by flirting with their boyfriends.	Ally Pinnock
1	Fame Whore	Proclaims herself as being famous and makes several failed publicity stunts in hopes of becoming more well known. Stunts include crashing into red carpet events asking celebrities to participate in a sex tape, selling her own 'celebrity' products and demanding privileges from people by making an excuse that she is a celebrity.	Janis McGavin
1	Flatmate Wanted	Interviews many of her potential roommates who are interested in sharing an apartment with her but during the middle of the interview she would 'inadvertently' reveal some unusual fact about herself. Afterwards, she'd ask if they are still interested to move in.	Rachael Coopes
1, 2	The Game Show Host From Hell	Presents a fake game show that either makes the victim undergo very unfair disadvantages or gives an unfair advantage to another player, as well as putting the victims in uncomfortable situations. Some segments were taken from the original UK version but the rest were series exclusives like "Car of Cash", based on Cash Cab which Kerley also hosted on another channel.	James Kerley (Season 1) John Burgess (Season 2)
1, 2	Just Come Out	A desperate gay guy who recently came out and goes to the public to try to get into awkward and unwanted sexual encounters with many straight men. Not aware that he's gay, he would often twist things around telling people that it is a "gay code" for wanting to do something inappropriate with him leaving them in uncomfortable situations.	Rhys Nicholson
1, 2	Neg's Urban Sports Down Under	Returning to reprise his role as the inventor of the Urban Sports, Neg plays games with unsuspecting Australian victims. His segments includes new Urban Sports such as Seagulling (attracts a flock of seagulls towards people by throwing food) and Shark Attack (goes to a beach and make false alarms of shark to fool people into rushing out of the water in fear).	Neg Dupree
1, 2	Nude Girl (Season 1); Nude Twins (Season 2)	Tricks people in charge of public places into allowing them to disrobe – for example, by asking whether there is a dress code or by asking them (who are unaware that they are wearing nothing underneath) if they can take their coat off. The reaction of other people in the vicinity is then caught on camera.	Katia Taylor (Season 1) Bea Hampson, Cassie Gotardo (Season 2)
1	Show Us Your Balls	A segment hosted by Reucassel where members of the studio audience are dared to engage in painful, revolting and humiliating acts.	N/A
1 2	Very Foreign Correspondent	A correspondent from India, who goes undercover in Australia taking various jobs in order to observe the Australian public's attitude towards Indian people and would often try accusing them of racism at every opportunity.	Nazeem Hussain
2	Prank TV OZ	Returning to reprise her role as the celebrity prankster from the Original UK series, she takes on an array of personas in order to prank various people and sets them up with hidden cameras. Her act in this series is likely based on her hidden camera show, Dirty Sexy Funny	Olivia Lee
2	The Misfits Stunt Crew	A duo who come up with various crazy ways of inflicting self-harm upon themselves in the name of comedy. Similar to "The Pain Men" who appeared on the UK series.	Steve Bradley, Jeffrey Antonio
2	Short Tempered	Goes out to public places and inquires about something in order to deliberately perceive innocent references to size (be it someone mentioning a pair of shorts, the DVD Stuart Little or the song Tiny Dancer) as a clear insult about his own height. His act is likely based on many of his comedy routines which focus on the way people of normal stature react to him. Similar to "Militant Black Guy" from the UK series.	Imaan Hadchiti

== Series overview ==
=== Season one (2011) ===
No. overall	No. in season	Acts	Winner
1	1	Fame Whore; The Game Show Host From Hell; Neg's Urban Sports Down Under; Nude Girl	Nude Girl
2	2	Bunny Boiler; The Game Show Host From Hell; Neg's Urban Sports Down Under; Show Us Your Balls	Bunny Boiler
3	3	The Annoying Devil; Just Come Out; Neg's Urban Sports Down Under; Nude Girl	The Annoying Devil
4	4	Fame Whore; The Game Show Host From Hell; Neg's Urban Sports Down Under; Show Us Your Balls	James Kerley (The Game Show Host From Hell)
5	5	The Annoying Devil; Bunny Boiler; The Game Show Host From Hell; Very Foreign Correspondent	Very Foreign Correspondent
6	6	Fame Whore; Flatmate Wanted; The Game Show Host From Hell; Neg's Urban Sports Down Under	Fame Whore
7	7	Just Come Out; Neg's Urban Sports Down Under; Nude Girl; Very Foreign Correspondent	Nude Girl
8	8	Bunny Boiler; The Game Show Host From Hell; Neg's Urban Sports Down Under; Show Us Your Balls	Neg
9	9	The Annoying Devil; Bunny Boiler; Flatmate Wanted; The Game Show Host From Hell	Flatmate Wanted
10	10	The Game Show Host From Hell; Just Come Out; Neg's Urban Sports Down Under; Show Us Your Balls	Neg

Act	Episodes										Appearances	Wins
Act	1	2	3	4	5	6	7	8	9	10	Appearances	Wins
The Annoying Devil			X		X				X		3	1
Bunny Boiler		X			X			X	X		4	1
Fame Whore	X			X		X					3	1
Flatmate Wanted						X			X		2	1
The Game Show Host From Hell	X	X		X	X	X		X	X	X	8	1
Just Come Out			X				X			X	3	
Neg's Urban Sports Down Under	X	X	X	X		X	X	X		X	8	2
Nude Girl	X		X				X				3	2
Show Us Your Balls		X		X				X		X	4	
Very Foreign Correspondent					X		X				2	1
Winner	Nude Girl	Bunny Boiler	The Annoying Devil	James Kerley	Very Foreign Correspondent	Fame Whore	Nude Girl	Neg	Flatmate Wanted	Neg		

=== Season two (2012) ===
No. overall	No. in season	Acts	Winner
11	1	Prank TV OZ; The Game Show Host From Hell; The Misfits Stunt Crew; Nude Twins	Olivia Lee (Prank TV OZ)
12	2	Bunny Boiler; The Game Show Host From Hell; Neg's Urban Sports Down Under; Very Foreign Correspondent	John Burgess (The Game Show Host From Hell)
13	3	Bunny Boiler; Just Come Out; Short Tempered; Very Foreign Correspondent	Short Tempered
14	4	Prank TV OZ; The Misfits Stunt Crew; Neg's Urban Sports Down Under; Nude Twins	The Misfits Stunt Crew
15	5	Prank TV OZ; The Game Show Host From Hell; Neg's Urban Sports Down Under; Short Tempered	John Burgess
16	6	Bunny Boiler; The Misfits Stunt Crew; Neg's Urban Sports Down Under; Very Foreign Correspondent	Neg
17	7	The Game Show Host From Hell; Just Come Out; Neg's Urban Sports Down Under; Nude Twins	Nude Twins
18	8	Bunny Boiler; The Misfits Stunt Crew; Short Tempered; Very Foreign Correspondent	Bunny Boiler
19	9	Prank TV OZ; The Game Show Host From Hell; Neg's Urban Sports Down Under; Very Foreign Correspondent	Very Foreign Correspondent
20	10	Bunny Boiler; Just Come Out; The Misfits Stunt Crew; Neg's Urban Sports Down Under	Just Come Out

Act	Episodes										Appearances	Wins
Act	1	2	3	4	5	6	7	8	9	10	Appearances	Wins
Prank TV OZ	X			X	X				X		4	1
Bunny Boiler		X	X			X		X		X	5	1
The Game Show Host From Hell	X	X			X		X		X		5	2
Just Come Out			X				X			X	3	1
The Misfits Stunt Crew	X			X		X		X		X	5	1
Neg's Urban Sports Down Under		X		X	X	X	X		X	X	7	1
Nude Twins	X			X			X				3	1
Short Tempered			X		X			X			3	1
Very Foreign Correspondent		X	X			X		X	X		5	1
Winner	Olivia Lee	John Burgess	Short Tempered	The Misfits Stunt Crew	John Burgess	Neg	Nude Twins	Bunny Boiler	Very Foreign Correspondent	Just Come Out		

== Reception ==
It is the highest rating show in the history of The Comedy Channel, doubling the ratings of the previous record holder The Merrick and Rosso Show. Due to the popularity of the first series, a second series premiered in January 2012.

Garnier also became its sponsor for its second series with John Burgess acting as the spokesperson and promoter in the commercial for Garnier Men Mineral Deodorants.

It won the award for Most Outstanding Light Entertainment Program at the 2012 Astra Awards.
