= Ed Weeks =

British actor

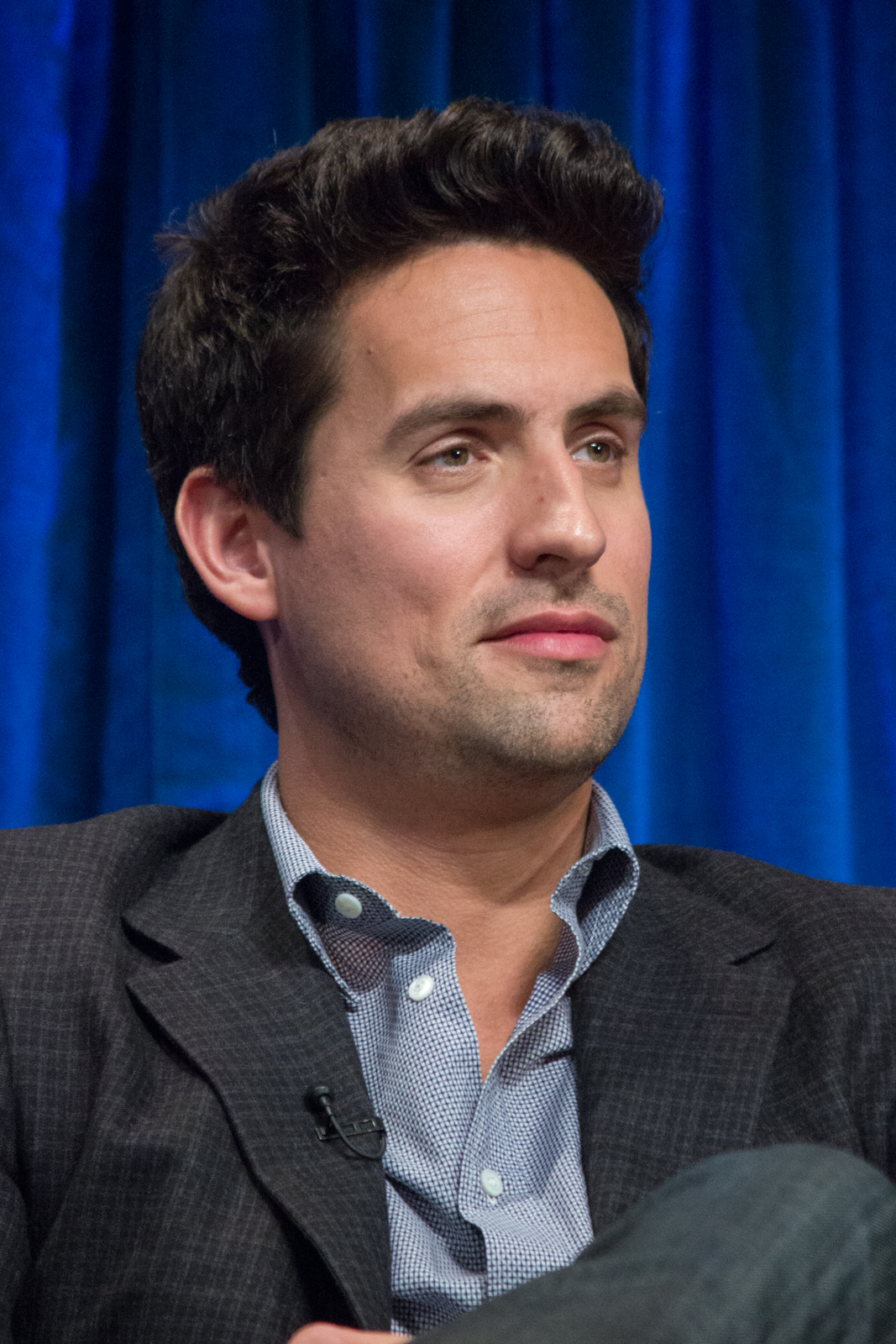
- Weeks at PaleyFest 2013
- Born: Edward Charles Egerton Weeks; 25 October 1980 (age 45); Banbury, England
- Education: Trinity College, Cambridge
- Occupation: Actor
- Years active: 2002–present
- Partner: Bellamy Young (2016–2017)

Edward Charles Egerton Weeks (born 25 October 1980) is an English actor. He is best known for starring as Dr. Jeremy Reed in the Fox/Hulu comedy series The Mindy Project (2012–2017). He also starred as Colin in the Fox comedy series LA to Vegas (2018).

== Early life and career ==
Weeks was born and raised in England. His mother is a native of El Salvador. Weeks was educated at Queen's College, Taunton and Trinity College, Cambridge, where he was President of the Cambridge Footlights. Upon graduating, he wrote for various TV shows, including Man Stroke Woman, Clone and Hotel Trubble (all BBC).

As an actor, he appeared in My Family (BBC), The IT Crowd (Channel 4), Not Going Out (BBC) and Phoo Action (BBC) in which he played Prince William. He was Olivia Lee's sidekick and co-prankster on her Comedy Central hidden camera show Dirty Sexy Funny.

=== U.S. ===
In 2011, Weeks moved to Los Angeles, and sold an original pilot to CBS. In 2012, he was one of the first regular roles cast in The Mindy Project.

The show was picked up by Fox in May 2012 and, after moving to Hulu, was renewed in 2017 for a 6th and final season.

In 2015, Weeks guest-starred as a pretentious method actor on the USA Network series Royal Pains. The same year, he appeared in the film The Leisure Class.

In November 2015, ABC bought the rights to a comedy series that Weeks co-wrote with Hannah Mackay (former writer on Peep Show) and ordered a pilot. The show was to be produced by Weeks, Mackay and Mindy Kaling.

In March 2017, Weeks joined the Fox comedy pilot LA to Vegas, playing an economics professor commuting to Vegas every weekend to see his toddler son. In May the same year, the pilot was picked up for series.

== Filmography ==
=== Film ===
Year	Title	Role	Notes
2009	Fused	Simon	Short film
2009	The Interviewee	Interviewer No. 3	Short film
2015	3rd Street Blackout	Nathan Blonket	
2015	The Leisure Class	Charles Devonshire	HBO's Project Greenlight
2020	Sylvie's Love	Chase Nickerson	
2025	Drop	Phil	

=== Television ===
Year	Title	Role	Notes
2005–2007	Man Stroke Woman		Writer; 8 episodes
2007	Comedy Shuffle	Various	2 episodes; also writer
2008	Phoo Action	Prince William	One-off drama
2009	Not Going Out	Robin	Episode: "Party"
2009	Transmission Impossible with Ed and Oucho	Chad Whackman	Episode 8
2010–2011	Dirty Sexy Funny	Various	16 episodes; also writer
2010	The IT Crowd	John	Episode: "Jen the Fredo"
2010	My Family	Wilkinson	Episode: "Slammertime"
2010	Hotel Trubble	Darren Chiseljaw	Episode: "Strictly Come Prancing"
2011	Dick and Dom's Funny Business	Dexter	2 episodes
2012–2017	The Mindy Project	Dr. Jeremy Reed	Series regular; 107 episodes
2015	Royal Pains	Cole Chapman Smith	Guest star
2015	Project Greenlight	Self	
2016	House of Lies	Daniel Hathaway	Guest star
2018	LA to Vegas	Colin McCormack	Series regular
2019–2020	American Housewife	British Greg Otto	2 episodes
2020	Robot Chicken	Jared Nomak, Superglue (voice)	Episode: "Buster Olive in: The Monkey Got Closer Overnight"
2022	Kung Fu Panda: The Dragon Knight	Colin (voice)	3 episodes
2023	Not Dead Yet	Phillip	3 episodes
2024	Velma	Mr. S (voice)	Episode: "The Mystery of Teen Romance"
2026	Eternally Yours	Charles	Series regular
