= The Leisure Class =

- Promotional release poster
- Written by: Pete Jones; Jason Mann
- Directed by: Jason Mann
- Starring: Ed Weeks; Tom Bell; Bruce Davison; Brenda Strong; Bridget Regan
- Music by: Brian Byrne
- Country of origin: United States
- Original language: English

Production
- Executive producers: Matt Damon; Ben Affleck; Bobby Farrelly; Peter Farrelly; Jennifer Todd; T. J. Barrack; Perrin Chiles; Marshall Lewy
- Producers: Effie Brown; Marc Joubert
- Cinematography: Trevor Forrest
- Editor: Craig Hayes
- Running time: 90 minutes
- Production companies: Adaptive Studios; Pearl Street Films; Miramax
- Budget: $3 million

Original release
- Release: November 2, 2015

The Leisure Class is a 2015 black comedy farce television film by HBO Films about a man who is trying to marry into a wealthy family and his unpredictable brother. The film was directed by Project Greenlight season four contest winner, Jason Mann, written by Mann and Project Greenlight season one winner Pete Jones, and produced by Effie T. Brown and Marc Jouburt. It is based on a 2012 short film produced and co-written by Mann that premiered at the 2013 Raindance Film Festival. Season 4 of Project Greenlight aired on HBO as a documentary series chronicling the selection of Mann and the production of the film. The film premiered in Los Angeles in August 2015 and aired on HBO on November 2, 2015 to universally negative reception with a 0% on Rotten Tomatoes.

== Production ==
In November 2014, it was announced that Mann had won Project Greenlight's season 4 contest to direct a film for HBO. Originally the contest winner was going to direct Not Another Pretty Woman, a broad comedy screenplay. However, after Mann shared the script for a full-length version of a short film he had written, The Leisure Class, it was decided he would instead direct that script. HBO set the film's budget at $3 million.

=== Casting ===
The main character is played by Ed Weeks, and his brother, Leonard, is played by Tom Bell. The matriarch of the wealthy family is played by Brenda Strong. The film's cast also includes Bruce Davison, Rory Knox Johnston, Christine Lakin, Bridget Regan, Scottie Thompson, and Melanie Zanetti.

== Reception ==
The Leisure Class received negative reviews from critics. On Rotten Tomatoes, the film has a rating of 0%, based on 9 reviews, with an average rating of 3.9/10. On Metacritic, the film has a score of 25 out of 100, based on 7 critics, indicating "generally unfavorable reviews".
