= Balls of Steel (TV series) =

British television comedy game show (2005–2008)

- Genre: Comedy; Game show
- Presented by: Mark Dolan
- Country of origin: United Kingdom
- Original language: English
- No. of series: 3
- No. of episodes: 19 (list of episodes)

Production
- Running time: 50 minutes (inc. adverts)
- Production company: Objective Productions

Original release
- Network: Channel 4
- Release: 19 August 2005 – 25 April 2008

Balls of Steel was a British television comedy game show hosted by Mark Dolan. Dolan's special guests perform stunts and hold their nerve during hidden camera set-ups in the presence of celebrities or the British public.

Massive Balls of Steel, the spin-off series to Balls of Steel, was broadcast on E4, showing highlights of the show.

== Format ==
There were a total of 12 acts. In each episode, six acts competed with one of them being the winner from the previous episode. At the end of each episode the studio audience had to decide which act had the biggest 'Balls of Steel' by voting on a keypad.

== Transmissions ==
Series	Episodes	Originally released	
Series	Episodes	First released	Last released
1	7	19 August 2005	30 September 2005
2	6	16 February 2007	23 March 2007
3	6	21 March 2008	25 April 2008

== Balls of Steel internationally ==
=== UK version broadcasts ===
It aired on The Comedy Channel in Australia in 2011 and 2013 and in the past, has also been shown on the Nine Network. In Latin America, it is broadcast on Sony Entertainment Television, in New Zealand on C4, in Germany on RTL II, in Denmark on TV 2 Zulu, in Portugal on SIC Radical, Norway on TV2 Zebra, in Sweden on Kanal 5, in Poland on TVN, in the Netherlands on RTL 5, and in Russia on 2x2.

=== Local versions ===
An Australian version of the show, Balls of Steel Australia was put into production for Australian subscription television channel The Comedy Channel.

In 2007 an Italian version of the format was broadcast on Rai 2.

== Controversy ==
Before its first broadcast, Balls of Steel received publicity during the London premiere of the film War of the Worlds when actor Tom Cruise was squirted with a water pistol disguised as a microphone as a part of Olivia Lee's Prank TV segment. Four people involved were arrested but were later released on bail. However, Cruise did not press charges, with his publicist saying, "These guys aren't worth the time or energy".

Others who were squirted with a water pistol included Fredrik Reinfeldt, Prime Minister of Sweden. Sveriges Television, where the Swedish version Ballar av stål was going to air, decided to cancel the show after massive criticism.

The show has also had its fair share of complaints from viewers. Some complaints were directed at the Annoying Devil for his roller coaster stunt where he threw buckets of "vomit" at the passengers. Balls of Steel responded to OFCOM saying that the vomit used by the Annoying Devil was fake and a disclaimer was added when the episode was repeated. A further complaint to OFCOM was not upheld when the show explained that the "victims" in Neg Dupree's Big Stranger Rodeo Urban Sports segment had been "set up". Barrie Hall, who played the Annoying Devil in series two and three, said in an interview that "just about everyone we 'get' has been set up by friends!"
