= Jason Mann =

American film director and screenwriter

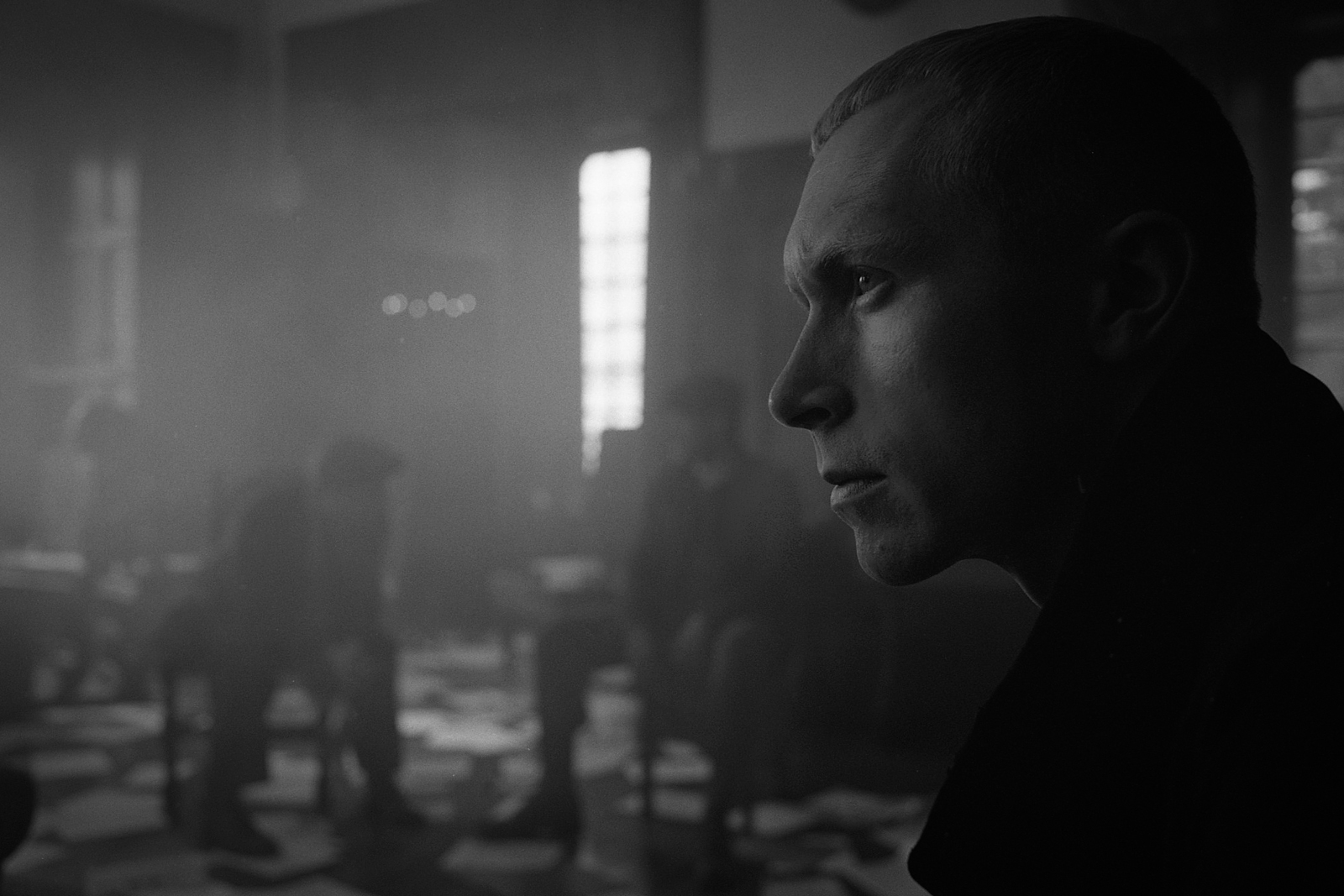
- Born: United States
- Education: Loyola Marymount University, Columbia University School of the Arts
- Occupations: Film director, screenwriter
- Known for: Project Greenlight
- Notable work: The Leisure Class

Jason Mann is an American film director and screenwriter. In November 2014 he won Project Greenlight's season 4 contest, then directing The Leisure Class (2015) for HBO.

== Personal life ==
Jason Mann grew up in San Mateo County, California, and attended Burlingame High School. Mann received a BA in film production from Loyola Marymount University and an MFA in film directing from Columbia University School of the Arts.

== Career ==
Mann's short film Delicacy, co-written with Frieda Luk, premiered at the Austin, Telluride, and Tribeca film festivals in 2012 and 2013. Another short film, The Leisure Class, premiered at the Raindance Film Festival in 2013.

In November 2014, it was announced that Mann had won, with his short film Delicacy, Project Greenlight's season 4 contest to direct a film for HBO. At the time, Mann was in his fourth-year at the Columbia University School of the Arts. Originally the contest winner was going to direct Not A Pretty Woman, a comedy. However, after Mann shared the script for a full-length version of a short film he had written, it was decided he would instead direct that script, The Leisure Class, which was released on HBO in 2015.
