= Olivia Lee =

British comedian, actress and TV host

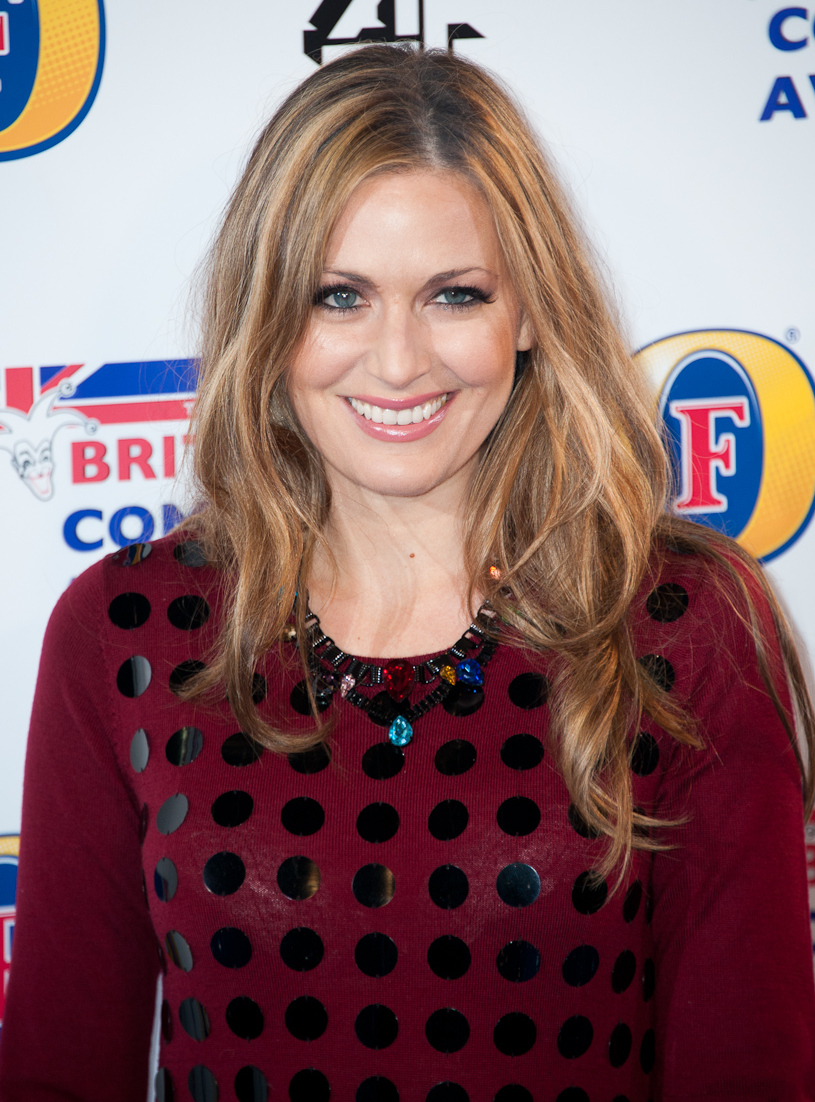
- Lee in 2013
- Born: 27 August 1980 (age 46); London, England
- Education: Royal Central School of Speech and Drama
- Occupations: Comedian, writer, actress, television presenter

Olivia Lee (born 27 August 1980) is a British comedian, actress and writer.

== Early life ==
Lee is from a Jewish family. She studied acting at the Central School of Speech and Drama.

== Career ==
Lee worked as a presenter alongside Simon Amstell on Channel 4's T4. She later appeared on comedy show Balls of Steel, where she pulled pranks such as interviewing celebrities with a penis-shaped microphone. She was later given her own show on Channel 4, Naughty Bits, and performed hidden camera pranks on The Tonight Show with Jay Leno.

Lee appeared in an episode of The Basil Brush Show in 2004. In 2006, she was interviewed and featured in a photoshoot for FHM. In March 2009, she appeared as a guest on internet talk show Tom Green's House Tonight. Dirty Sexy Funny, a hidden camera show, which originally piloted on Channel 4 in 2008, began airing on Comedy Central in March 2010 and ran for two seasons. Lee was the host of the Fox Reality Channel game show Battle of the Bods based on the equally short-lived British game show Hot Tub Ranking before Fox Reality's dissolution ended its run.

In January 2012, it was announced that Lee would join the cast of Balls of Steel Australia for its second series. Her act in the show is "Prank TV Oz", in which she pranks various members of the public while taking on different personas in a similar manner to her hidden camera show Dirty Sexy Funny.

Lee was invited to appear on The Tonight Show With Jay Leno, where she wrote and provided comedy for the show. That led to TruTV giving Lee her own comedy pilot, ‘The Olivia Lee Show’ – which Ben Stiller produced with his company Red Hour. This previous focus in her work resulted in Sky News stating "Olivia Lee was once the queen of prank TV."

== Personal life ==
Lee is married to Dan Renton Skinner, the couple have a child together. They met when they both appeared on a celebrity version of Come Dine with Me.
