= Stolen Summer =

- Theatrical release poster
- Directed by: Pete Jones
- Written by: Pete Jones
- Produced by: Chris Moore; Ben Affleck; Matt Damon
- Starring: Aidan Quinn; Bonnie Hunt; Kevin Pollak; Brian Dennehy
- Cinematography: Peter Biagi
- Edited by: Gregg Featherman
- Music by: Danny Lux
- Distributed by: Miramax Films
- Release date: March 22, 2002
- Running time: 91 minutes
- Country: United States
- Language: English
- Budget: $1.8 million
- Box office: $134,736

Stolen Summer is a 2002 American drama film about a Catholic boy who befriends a terminally ill Jewish boy and tries to convert him, believing that it is the only way the Jewish boy will get to Heaven. Directed by first time writer/director Pete Jones, Stolen Summer is the first film produced for Project Greenlight, an independent film competition created by Ben Affleck and Matt Damon, and sponsored by HBO. Project Greenlight aired on HBO as a documentary series chronicling the selection of Jones's script from approximately seven thousand entries, and the production of the film in Chicago in 2001.

The film's casting department considered the casting of the Jewish Adi Stein as the Catholic Pete O'Malley to be an ironic joke, due to the characters attempting to convert a Jewish boy to Catholicism.

== Cast ==
- Adi Stein as Pete O'Malley
- Mike Weinberg as Danny Jacobsen
- Aidan Quinn as Joe O'Malley
- Bonnie Hunt as Margaret O'Malley
- Kevin Pollak as Rabbi Jacobsen
- Brian Dennehy as Father Kelly
- Ryan Jonathan Kelley as Seamus O'Malley
- Eddie Kaye Thomas as Patrick O'Malley
- Will Malnati as Eddie O'Malley

== Box office ==
The domestic total gross for the film was $134,726. Production costs were $1.8 million.

== Critical reception ==
On the review aggregator website Rotten Tomatoes, 37% of 57 critics' reviews are positive. The website's consensus reads: "Stolen Summer feels like a sugary after-school special stretched out to feature length." On Metacritic, the film has a weighted average score of 36 out of 100, based on 24 critics, indicating "generally unfavorable reviews".
