= Project Greenlight =

American reality television series

- Also known as: Project Greenlight: A New Generation (season 5)
- Created by: Alex Keledjian
- Developed by: Eli Holzman
- Country of origin: United States
- Original language: English
- No. of seasons: 5
- No. of episodes: 43

Production
- Executive producers: Ben Affleck (season 1–4); Matt Damon (season 1–4); Chris Moore (season 1–3); Sean Bailey (season 1–3); Bob Weinstein (season 1–3); Harvey Weinstein (season 1–3); Billy Campbell (season 1–2); Bob Osher (season 1–2); Alexandra Lipsitz (season 3–5); Marc Joubert (season 4); T. J. Barrack (season 4); Perrin Chiles (season 4); Marshall Lewy (season 4); Zanne Devine (season 4); Jennifer Todd (season 4); Issa Rae (season 5); Montrel McKay (season 5); Jane Lipsitz (season 5); Dan Cutforth (season 5); Dan Volpe (season 5); Nan Strait (season 5); Zoe Jackson (season 5); Asabi Lee (season 5); Dave Becky (season 5); Jonathan Berry (season 5); Kumail Nanjiani (season 5); Gina Prince-Bythewood (season 5); Bill Block (season 5); Marc Helwig (season 5)
- Camera setup: Single-camera
- Production companies: Adaptive Studios (season 1–4); LivePlanet (season 1–3); Pearl Street Films (season 4); Hoorae Media (season 5); 3 Arts Entertainment (season 5); Miramax Television; Alfred Street Industries (season 5)

Original release
- Network: HBO
- Release: December 2, 2001 – August 24, 2003
- Network: Bravo
- Release: March 15 – May 12, 2005
- Network: HBO
- Release: September 13 – November 1, 2015
- Network: HBO Max
- Release: July 13, 2023 – present

Project Greenlight is an American documentary television series focusing on first-time filmmakers being given the chance to direct a feature film. It was created by Alex Keledjian, developed by Eli Holzman and produced by Ben Affleck, Matt Damon, Sean Bailey, and Chris Moore through their production company LivePlanet, along with Miramax Films. Project Greenlight first aired on HBO for two seasons (aired 2001–03) before moving to Bravo for season 3 in 2005. The series returned in 2015 for a fourth season airing on HBO. On July 26, 2016, the series was canceled. In May 2021, HBO Max (later Max) picked up the series with an 8-episode order produced by Issa Rae through her production company Hoorae Media. The revival titled Project Greenlight: A New Generation premiered on July 13, 2023.

== Episodes ==
Season	Episodes	Originally aired		
Season	Episodes	Season premiere	Season finale	Network
1	12	December 2, 2001	February 10, 2002	HBO
2	13	June 22, 2003	August 24, 2003	HBO
3	9	March 15, 2005	May 12, 2005	Bravo
4	8	September 13, 2015	November 1, 2015	HBO
5	10	July 13, 2023	July 13, 2023	HBO Max

=== Season 1 (2001–02) ===
The script contest ran from September 2000 to March 2001. Over 7,000 screenplays were submitted, and Pete Jones was selected as the winner for Stolen Summer, which he then filmed on location in his hometown of Chicago during the summer of 2001. The first season of Project Greenlight, helmed by show runner and co-executive producer Liz Bronstein, chronicled the selection of Jones's script and the filming of the movie, aired on HBO from late 2001 through early 2002. Stolen Summer premiered at the Sundance Film Festival in January 2002, then went on to a limited theatrical release which brought in just under $140,000.

=== Season 2 (2003) ===
For its second run, the contest was split into two categories: writing and directing. The winners were chosen on January 18, 2003. Erica Beeney won the writing contest for her script The Battle of Shaker Heights, and Kyle Rankin and Efram Potelle won the directing contest. The film stars Shia LaBeouf, Elden Henson, Amy Smart, and William Sadler. The series aired in the summer of 2003, detailing the production of the film in Los Angeles. The Battle of Shaker Heights opened in limited theatrical release on August 24, 2003, earning just under $280,000 during its box office run.

=== Season 3 (2005) ===
Script submission began and ended during February 2004. After two seasons on HBO, the series moved to Bravo and season 3 began airing on March 15, 2005.

The selected screenplay was a horror script titled Feast written by Marcus Dunstan and Patrick Melton. The director was John Gulager. The film stars Balthazar Getty, Krista Allen, Jason Mewes, and Eric Dane and was produced by Dimension Films and Neo Art & Logic.

The film ran for a special late night showing on September 22 and 23, 2006, almost a year after its premiere. Feast earned just under $690,000 during its box office run. The DVD was released on October 17, 2006, earning an additional $4,687,595. The film spawned two sequels: Feast II: Sloppy Seconds and Feast III: The Happy Finish.

=== Season 4 (2015) ===
No. overall	No. in season	Title	Original release date	U.S. viewers (millions)
35	1	"Do You Want to Direct This Movie?"	September 13, 2015	0.154
Finalists of a nationwide talent search to direct Not Another Pretty Woman, a broad comedy screenplay, as a film for HBO are narrowed down by producers Ben Affleck, Matt Damon, Bobby & Peter Farrelly, Effie Brown, and Marc Joubert, Pearl Street Films President Jennifer Todd, and HBO Films President Len Amato. After a series of submissions and in-person interviews by all the finalists, finalist Jason Mann is selected as the project's director.
36	2	"Going Rogue"	September 20, 2015	0.113
37	3	"Gun to Your Head"	September 27, 2015	0.218
38	4	"Duly Noted"	October 4, 2015	0.342
39	5	"Picture's Up"	October 11, 2015	0.141
40	6	"The Pivot"^{[a]}	October 18, 2015	0.212
41	7	"Accident Waiting to Happen"	October 25, 2015	0.143
42	8	"Hug and Release"	November 1, 2015	0.205

On April 2, 2015, Project Greenlight announced the first annual Greenie award winners.

- Best Comedy: Heist – Director: Brianna Lux and Tony Lazzeroni
- Best Drama: A Room for Aden – Director: Douglas Yablun
- Best Action: Stan Lee Parkour – Director: Tom Grey
- Most Unique: Listen – Director: Joshua Ortiz
- Best Horror: The Table – Director: Shane Free
- Most "WTF": Pink Shorts – Director: Jeff Huston

In September 2015, Project Greenlight became the subject of controversy when an episode aired of Matt Damon disagreeing with producer Effie Brown over the subject of diversity. A later controversy developed over the titling of the season's sixth episode as "Hot Ghetto Mess" involving Brown's attempt to make sure one of the films did not partake in racial stereotypes, which was to be corrected before airing and replaced with "The Pivot", but was never resolved before airtime.

The Leisure Class debuted on HBO on November 2, 2015.

=== Season 5 (2023) ===
Season 5 is a revival of the original series, rebooted as Project Greenlight: A New Generation, premiered on July 13, 2023. The show intentionally shifts the focus to emerging female filmmakers, addressing a long-standing lack of representation behind the camera. Instead of Damon and Affleck, the reboot is led by a new creative team Issa Rae (Executive Producer, mentor, on-camera guide, Kumail Nanjiani (mentor), Gina Prince-Bythewood (mentor/director). The season follows the selection of filmmaker Meko Winbush who is given the opportunity to direct her first feature film. She is provided with a script for the sci-fi thriller Gray Matter and is tasked with developing and revising it with limited time, encountering all of the creative and logistical challenges of filmmaking. Gray Matter premiered on HBO Max on July 13, 2023, the same day as the show.

== Awards and nominations ==
Year	Award	Category	Nominee(s)	Result	Ref.
2002	Primetime Emmy Award	Outstanding Non-Fiction Program (Reality)	Ben Affleck, Sean Bailey, Liz Bronstein, Billy Campbell, Matt Damon, Tina Gazzerro, Eli Holzman, Chris Moore, Harvey Weinstein, Bob Weinstein, Tony Yates	Nominated	
2004	Primetime Emmy Award	Outstanding Reality Program	Ben Affleck, Sean Bailey, Dan Cutforth, Matt Damon, Eli Holzman, Jane Lipsitz, Chris Moore, Bob Osher, Randy Sacks, Harvey Weinstein, Bob Weinstein, Tony Yates	Nominated	
2005	Primetime Emmy Award	Outstanding Reality Program	Ben Affleck, Sean Bailey, Jennifer Berman, Frances Berwick, Rich Buhrman, Andrew Cohen, Dan Cutforth, Matt Damon, Gayle Gawlowski, Eli Holzman, Marc Joubert, Casey Kriley, Jane Lipsitz, Alexandra Lipsitz, Chris Moore, Kevin Morra, Bob Osher, Barbara Schneeweiss, David Serwatka, Larry Tanz, Harvey Weinstein, Bob Weinstein	Nominated	
2016	Primetime Emmy Award	Outstanding Unstructured Reality Program	Ben Affleck, Matt Damon, Jane Lipsitz, Dan Cutforth, TJ Barrack, Perrin Chiles, Marc Joubert, Marshall Lewy, Alexandra Lipsitz and Gaylen Gawlowski	Nominated	

== Australia ==
=== Series 1 ===
In 2005, Project Greenlight Australia was launched with Pay-TV Movie Network in partnership with Screentime producing the show and offering the A$1,000,000 financing to the winning film. The entries were received online with last entries being accepted on February 14. The screenplay selected from the 1200 submissions was Solo by Morgan O'Neill.

=== Series 2 ===
In 2006, comedian and filmmaker Paul McDermott hosted the series. The screenplay selected from the 700 submissions was The View from Greenhaven by The MacRae Brothers.

== Notes ==
^[a] The episode "The Pivot" was originally titled "Hot Ghetto Mess." However, the scene contextualizing the title was removed in last-minute editing. The original title was not corrected for television listings before air due to what was described as a "production error" by HBO. Future airings, along with HBO Go/HBO Now use "The Pivot" as the episode's title.
