= Good Will Hunting =

1997 film by Gus Van Sant

- Theatrical release poster
- Directed by: Gus Van Sant
- Written by: Ben Affleck; Matt Damon
- Produced by: Lawrence Bender
- Starring: Robin Williams; Matt Damon; Ben Affleck; Stellan Skarsgård; Minnie Driver
- Cinematography: Jean-Yves Escoffier
- Edited by: Pietro Scalia
- Music by: Danny Elfman
- Production companies: Miramax Films; Be Gentlemen; A Band Apart; Lawrence Bender Productions
- Distributed by: Miramax Films
- Release dates: December 2, 1997 (Bruin Theater); December 5, 1997 (United States)
- Running time: 126 minutes
- Country: United States
- Language: English
- Budget: $10–16 million
- Box office: $225.9 million

Good Will Hunting is a 1997 American drama film directed by Gus Van Sant and written by Ben Affleck and Matt Damon. It stars Damon, Affleck, Robin Williams, Stellan Skarsgård, and Minnie Driver, with Casey Affleck and Cole Hauser in supporting roles. Set in Boston, the film follows Will Hunting (Damon), a troubled but self-taught genius working as a janitor at MIT, whose talent is discovered by professor Gerald Lambeau (Skarsgård). To avoid jail, Will agrees to study under Lambeau while attending therapy with psychologist Sean Maguire (Williams), which forces him to confront his past and his relationships, including with Harvard student Skylar (Driver).

Released by Miramax Films, Good Will Hunting premiered on December 2, 1997, and opened in the United States on December 5. Produced on a budget of about $10–16 million, it became a commercial success, grossing $225.9 million worldwide.

The film received widespread critical acclaim, particularly for Williams' performance and Affleck and Damon's screenplay. At the 70th Academy Awards, it received nine nominations and won Best Supporting Actor (Williams) and Best Original Screenplay (Affleck and Damon). The soundtrack features a score by Danny Elfman and songs by singer-songwriter Elliott Smith, including the Oscar-nominated "Miss Misery".

== Plot ==
After being paroled, self-taught polymath Will Hunting, a rebellious 20-year-old man from South Boston, works as a janitor at the Massachusetts Institute of Technology (MIT) and spends his free time drinking with his friends Chuckie, Billy and Morgan. At work, he anonymously solves a complex mathematical problem posted on a blackboard by Professor Gerald Lambeau as a challenge for his graduate students. Later, Will and his friends start a fight with a gang that includes one of Will's childhood bullies. When police intervene, Will is charged with assaulting an officer. Lambeau posts a more difficult problem to test the mysterious stranger and later catches Will writing the solution. Mistaking Will for a vandal, Lambeau chases him off but quickly realizes that he was solving the problem. At a bar, Will meets Skylar, a student about to graduate from Harvard University, with plans to attend medical school at Stanford. Skylar approaches Will and flirts with him, before giving him her phone number.

Lambeau asks the campus maintenance staff about Will's whereabouts, but learns that he did not come to work. He discovers that Will was placed at MIT through a program for parolees and obtains his parole officer's details. At Will's court appearance, Lambeau watches as Will argues in favor of pro se legal representation and later arranges for him to avoid jail time, on the condition that he study math under Lambeau's supervision and attend therapy. Will agrees but treats his therapists with mockery. A desperate Lambeau contacts Dr. Sean Maguire, his college roommate, who teaches psychology at Bunker Hill Community College. Unlike the previous therapists, Sean challenges Will's defense mechanisms. In the first session, Sean threatens Will after he insults his deceased wife. In the next sessions, Sean encourages Will to open up and Will invites Sean to move on from his wife's death. Will starts dating Skylar but lies to her about his background.

Sean recounts to Will his first meeting with his wife: he saw her at a bar and fell in love at first sight, giving up his ticket to the famous sixth game of the 1975 World Series to his friends by saying he had to go "see about a girl". Sean tells Will that he never regretted that decision, despite the hardships that followed. Will decides to introduce Skylar to his friends. Lambeau sets up several job interviews for Will, but he scorns them. In particular, he turns down a position at the National Security Agency (NSA) with a scathing critique of the agency's moral position.

Skylar tells Will she loves him and asks him to move to California with her, but he coldly refuses. She calls him out for being scared, and he tells her about his past as an orphan and the abuse he suffered in foster homes. Will breaks up with Skylar and ridicules the research Lambeau had been doing. Sean confronts Will on his fear of abandonment and failure, and invites him to be honest about what he wants from life. Chuckie encourages Will to take the opportunities offered to him, telling him that every day he hopes that Will will not answer the door, having gone away to pursue a better life. A heartbroken Skylar leaves for San Francisco alone.

Will hears Sean and Lambeau argue about his potential, with Sean saying that Lambeau risks ruining Will's future by pushing him too hard. Lambeau leaves, and Sean and Will talk about their shared experience as victims of child abuse. Sean helps Will accept that the abuse he received was not because of anything he had done, repeatedly stating "It's not your fault." This causes Will to break down in tears while the two embrace.

Will accepts one of the job offers arranged by Lambeau. Sean reconciles with Lambeau and decides to take a sabbatical, promising Will that he will remain in contact. For Will's birthday, his friends gift him a car to allow him to commute to work. Chuckie goes to Will's house to pick him up, but happily finds that he left. Will leaves a note for Sean, asking him to tell Lambeau that he had to go "see about a girl". The film ends with Will driving his new car to California to reunite with Skylar.

== Cast ==
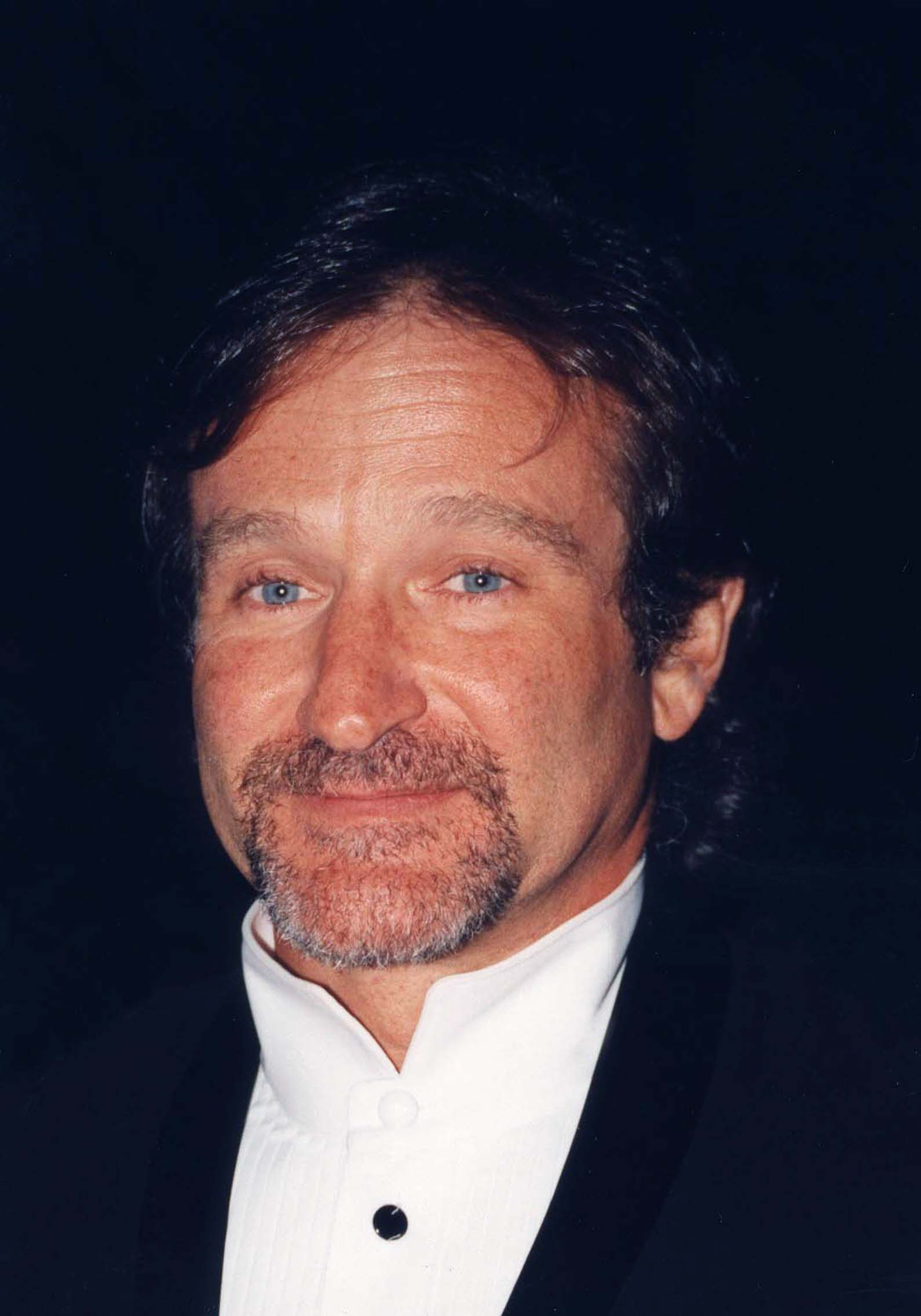
Robin Williams in 1996

- Matt Damon as Will Hunting, a rebellious 20-year-old self-taught mathematics genius and janitor at MIT from South Boston
- Robin Williams as Dr. Sean Maguire, a therapist and professor of psychology at Bunker Hill Community College from South Boston
- Ben Affleck as Chuckie Sullivan, a construction worker and Will's loyal childhood friend
- Stellan Skarsgård as Professor Gerald Lambeau, a Fields Medal-winning professor of mathematics at MIT
- Minnie Driver as Skylar, a wealthy British student at Harvard and Will's love interest

The cast includes Casey Affleck and Cole Hauser as Will's friends Morgan O'Mally and Billy McBride respectively; real-life mathematician John Mighton as Lambeau's assistant Tom; Scott William Winters as Clark, a Harvard student with whom Will argues; George Plimpton as Will's court-ordered therapist Henry Lipkin; Jimmy Flynn as Judge Malone; Christopher Britton and David Eisner as two of the company executives that interview Will; Alison Folland as a MIT student; and Bruce Hunter as a NSA agent that interviews Will. Film director Harmony Korine and visual artist Francesco Clemente make cameo appearances as Herve, a prisoner that Will sees in jail, and as a hypnotherapist respectively.

== Production ==
=== Writing ===
Actors and screenwriters Ben Affleck and Matt Damon met in their hometown of Cambridge, Massachusetts, becoming friends at a young age. Years later, Damon started writing Good Will Hunting as a final assignment for a playwriting class that he attended in his fifth year at Harvard, turning in a script of around 40 pages instead of the one-act play requested by his professor.

Damon said that only the scene of Will and Sean's first meeting survived verbatim from the first script. He left university after getting a role in the 1993 film Geronimo: An American Legend and joined Affleck in Los Angeles, bringing the script with him. Damon asked for Affleck's input, leading to the beginning of their long-standing creative collaboration with Good Will Hunting. Affleck and Damon were inspired to work on the script by director Quentin Tarantino's success story with the production of his 1992 film Reservoir Dogs, which had been picked up despite his being a store clerk due to word of mouth: Tarantino had talked about the film with producer Lawrence Bender, who brought the script to film star Harvey Keitel, whose interest in starring in it led to Tarantino's being able to find funding for the film. In Los Angeles, the duo secured small roles in films and commercials, sharing their earnings to sustain themselves while trying to break into the film industry without much success.

"In fact [Affleck's] girlfriend at the time was the janitor in my dorm in my freshman year, which made it even more bizarre. So when on Friday night the kids would get too drunk and throw up all over the place, I knew who was going to clear it up and it was someone I considered a friend. That kind of shift came out, I think, in the soup of Good Will."

— Damon in an interview with film critic Tom Shone

Affleck and Damon were inspired by the resentful feelings experienced in their childhood toward students who came to Cambridge to attend Harvard and MIT, taking over the city and not respecting its residents. However, Damon became conflicted after attending Harvard himself, seeing that the students were good-willed and witnessing first-hand the dichotomy between local and college life in Cambridge. Affleck and Damon drew on their families' and friends' life experiences for inspiration: Affleck's father and his then-girlfriend worked as janitors at Harvard, Affleck and Damon had worked in construction in the summers, and some of Affleck's father's and Damon's mother's past experiences informed Sean's background story. The duo purposefully wrote Sean's part as one with flexible characteristics, devising it as "the Harvey Keitel part"—meaning a role that suited a Hollywood star, giving the character their best lines but little screen time so it could easily fit in a busy schedule. Damon said: "It could have gone to Meryl Streep, you know what I mean? We could have done some rewrites and it becomes more of a mother/son relationship. It could have gone to Morgan Freeman... and then you bring in elements of racial tension around Boston."

Initially, the script dealt with the life of a young self-taught physics genius from South Boston sought after by the NSA for his extraordinary abilities. In scenes inspired by Martin Brest's Beverly Hills Cop (1984) and Midnight Run (1988), the young man and his friends lead the NSA agents in chases around the city, as Affleck and Damon felt they had to include an action subplot to make the film commercially appealing. The duo improvised some of the scenes and recorded them on tape while imitating Freeman and Robert De Niro, who they envisioned playing the roles of the therapist and the professor. Affleck and Damon shared the script with film producer Chris Moore, who liked it and decided to help them find a studio to produce it.

=== Financing ===
The duo completed the script in 1994 and brought it to their talent agent, Patrick Whitesell, who liked it. However, Whitesell thought it would be almost impossible to find a studio who would produce a film written by and starring two unknown actors, with the only precedent known to him being the 1976 film Rocky, in which previously unknown actor Sylvester Stallone wrote the script and starred in the lead role. At that point, Affleck and Damon had not yet agreed either on the title or on the main character's name, which Damon thought should be Nate. The duo then read a script named Good Will Hunting written by their high school friend Derrick Bridgeman, to whom they promised $10,000 in exchange for using the title if they managed to sell the script. Bridgeman later appeared in the film as a student in one of Lambeau's classes. Around this time, Damon filmed a role in The Good Old Boys and approached Tommy Lee Jones about co-starring in the film, but Jones declined. Additionally, Whitesell brought Good Will Hunting to the attention of several studio executives by initially promoting it as a Shane Black-style film like The Last Boy Scout (1991). Information about the script spread to other Hollywood creative executives in the span of four days, initiating a bidding war. Affleck and Damon accepted Castle Rock Entertainment's offer of $600,000 in November 1994 at the suggestion of director Richard Linklater, with whom Affleck had worked on the 1993 film Dazed and Confused. After splitting it evenly, both of them spent all of the money in six months, between paying taxes, giving their agents a fee, buying a Jeep Cherokee, and renting a party house by the Hollywood Bowl for months.

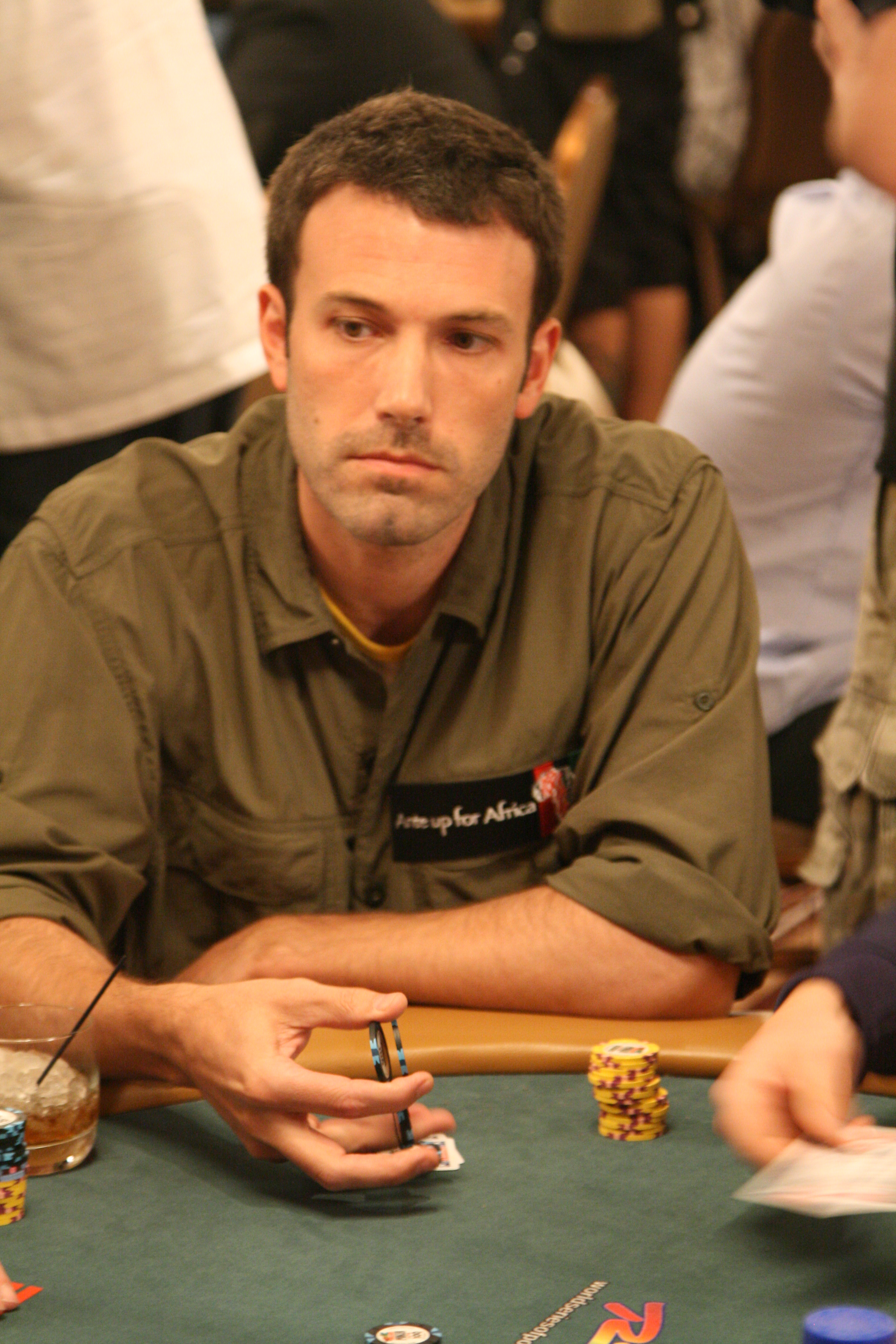
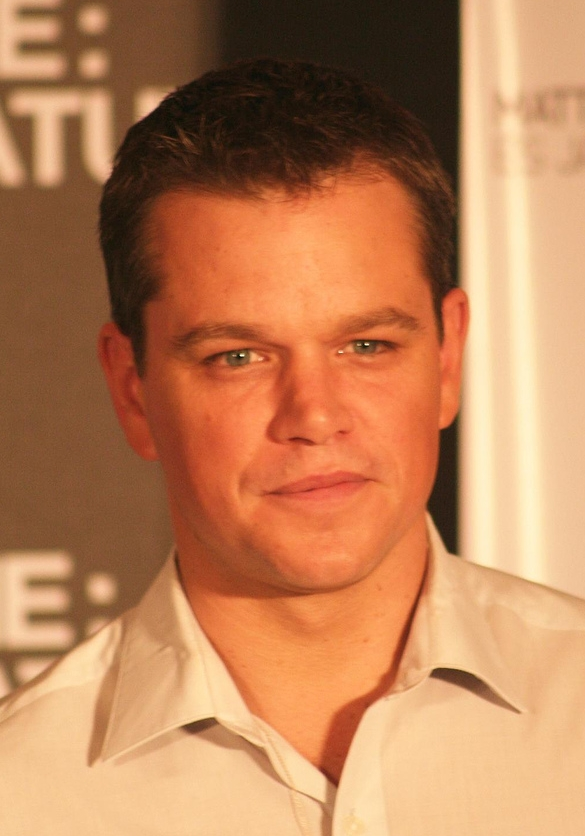
Ben Affleck in 2008 (left) and Matt Damon (right) in 2007

Film director and Castle Rock founder Rob Reiner urged Affleck and Damon to focus on either the thriller aspect or the relationship between Will and Sean. In one meeting set up by Castle Rock, screenwriter William Goldman read the script and agreed with Reiner, telling Affleck and Damon to drop the thriller storyline. The duo decided to focus on the characters' interpersonal relationship and removed 60 pages of the NSA storyline from the 120-to-130-page script, ending up rewriting it almost entirely. Castle Rock had them rewrite the script several times, but after a year Affleck and Damon began to suspect that studio executives had stopped reading it attentively. To test them, the duo began inserting scenes of Will and Sean having oral sex incongruous to the script, which the executives never mentioned in meetings. Affleck and Damon wanted to direct and star in the film, but the studio did not allow it. After they disagreed with Castle Rock's pick of obscure director Andrew Scheinman, the studio put the film into turnaround, asking Affleck and Damon to find another company that would buy Good Will Hunting for $1 million in thirty days. If they failed, Castle Rock would oust Affleck and Damon from the production, going ahead to make the film with another creative team.

Affleck and Damon went back to the studios that they had previously refused. Several executives set up meetings just to tell them that they would not buy the film. Affleck said that one such meeting with Interscope Communications founder Ted Field inspired him to write a scene of his 2012 film Argo. Studio executives wanted to cast more established actors like Leonardo DiCaprio and Brad Pitt in the lead role, but Damon kept reminding them of Stallone's story, which inspired him not to give up. Affleck asked Kevin Smith if he would direct the film and bring it to Miramax Films, as Affleck and Smith had worked together on the 1995 film Mallrats and had been developing the 1997 Miramax production Chasing Amy. Smith said he "wouldn't dare direct" it given its beauty, but brought the script to the attention of Miramax founder Harvey Weinstein. Weinstein liked it, but asked them to remove the fake scenes in which Will played chess and had sexual interactions with Sean, proving to Affleck and Damon that he had thoroughly read the script. In the fall of 1995, one day after reading it, Weinstein bought Good Will Hunting from Castle Rock for $1 million, sending the film into production with Affleck and Damon set to star. At Miramax, some executives disagreed with his decision; in particular, producer Cary Woods had previously turned down Affleck and Damon.

=== Pre-production ===
Serving as executive producer, Smith recommended that Miramax let Affleck and Damon direct Good Will Hunting, but the studio disagreed. Affleck and Damon suggested director Gus Van Sant, whom they had come to know and admire through his work with Affleck's brother Casey. Miramax sent the script to Van Sant, who said about his first reading of Good Will Hunting: "Usually when I read a script, after a few pages, I put it down—but this kept me going." He contacted and set up a meeting with Affleck through Casey. However, Weinstein disagreed with Affleck and Damon's pick and set up meetings for them with other potential directors, including Michael Mann. The Reality Bites (1994) director Ben Stiller refused an offer to direct the film since he had not heard of Affleck and Damon. The duo met with the Braveheart (1995) director Mel Gibson and began developing the film with him for a few months. However, Gibson's drawn-out production led Damon to ask him to drop out, since he feared he and Affleck would become too old to play their roles. After Gibson agreed, Miramax officially offered the film to Van Sant, but at a quarter of his asking price. Van Sant hesitated at the idea of working with Weinstein, having heard of his temper from Tarantino. Van Sant and Weinstein argued over final cut privilege, stopping production of the film. Weinstein kept searching for other directors, offering the film to and receiving a refusal from Chris Columbus. Meanwhile, Affleck and Damon moved back to Boston.

"An intelligent guy who admits he's not as brilliant as the kid but who is saying, 'You're brilliant but you don't know shit about certain things'. That appealed to me deeply. What can you give a kid like that? The one thing you can give him is just saying, 'I can only offer you a certain point of view.' It's almost like going though rehab and just trying to say, 'I know who you are, I know who you think you are. Let's try to get down to who you are.'"

— Williams in an interview with Boston

After a year, Weinstein assigned Bender to the film and agreed to pay Van Sant's asking price, prompted to resume the production by Damon's casting in Francis Ford Coppola's 1997 film The Rainmaker, based on John Grisham's 1995 novel of the same name, and film star Robin Williams' interest in Good Will Hunting. Damon explained that his casting in an adaptation of a novel by the popular Grisham gave Weinstein confidence of his potential as a leading man, but it was Williams' interest and eventual casting in the film that were pivotal to getting Good Will Hunting made. Williams had first heard of the film from Coppola, with whom he had collaborated on the 1996 film Jack, and received the script from Van Sant. He became fascinated with Sean's background and attitude towards Will, saying: "It's the same sense I had on Dead Poets Society, that there was something really powerful there." At the time, Williams' fee was around $20 million per movie, but he lowered it to $5 million and had it written in his contract with Miramax that he would get 20% of the earnings if the film's gross surpassed $60 million, with the percentage growing as the gross kept increasing. Miramax didn't believe it would earn that much, so they accepted.

Bender officially hired Van Sant as the director. Still unsure about the ending, Affleck and Damon talked about it with Van Sant. The duo had originally ended the script with Will's death at the hands of the gang that Will fights at the start of the film, but Van Sant proposed to have Chuckie be killed in an accident on the construction site. Affleck and Damon tried writing his idea of the ending, but scrapped that version after Van Sant read it and disliked it. The duo scheduled a meeting with Terrence Malick, film director and best friend of Affleck's godfather, who suggested to them ending the film with Will following Skylar to California, instead of them leaving together as they had considered.

Affleck and Damon tried to enlist Nobel Prize-winning physicist Sheldon Glashow's help to write accurate dialogues, but Glashow insisted that Will be a mathematician instead and introduced them to Professor Daniel Kleitman of MIT in the spring of 1997. Physicist Brian Greene retrospectively commented that physics discoveries are often made by a group, while solving a mathematical theorem can be an individual endeavour. Kleitman and mathematician Tom Bohman gave them a brief lecture and suggested the computer science P versus NP problem as one that Will could solve. Kleitman and Professor Patrick O'Donnell of the University of Toronto had small roles in the film and served as mathematics consultants on set, writing the equations on the blackboards shown in the film and coordinating some extras.

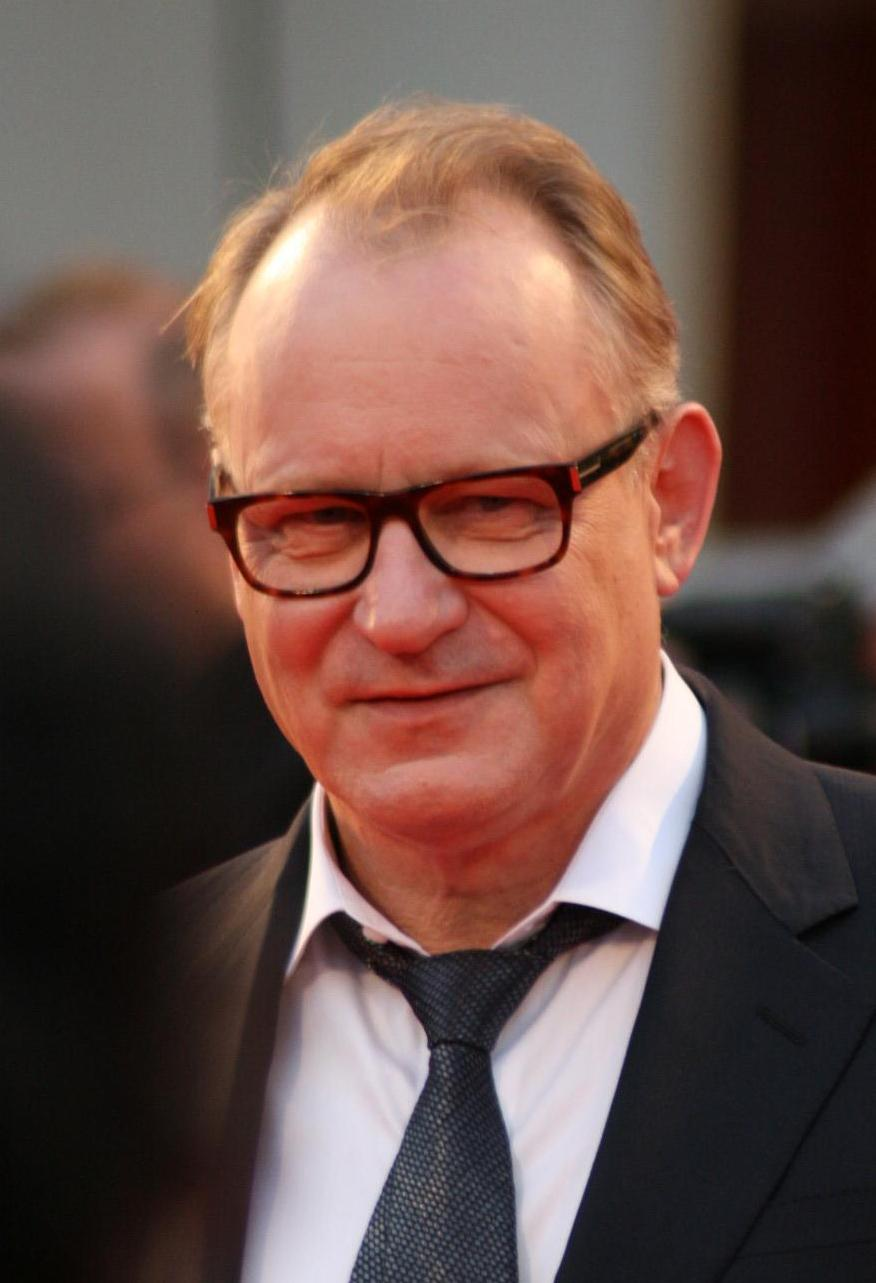
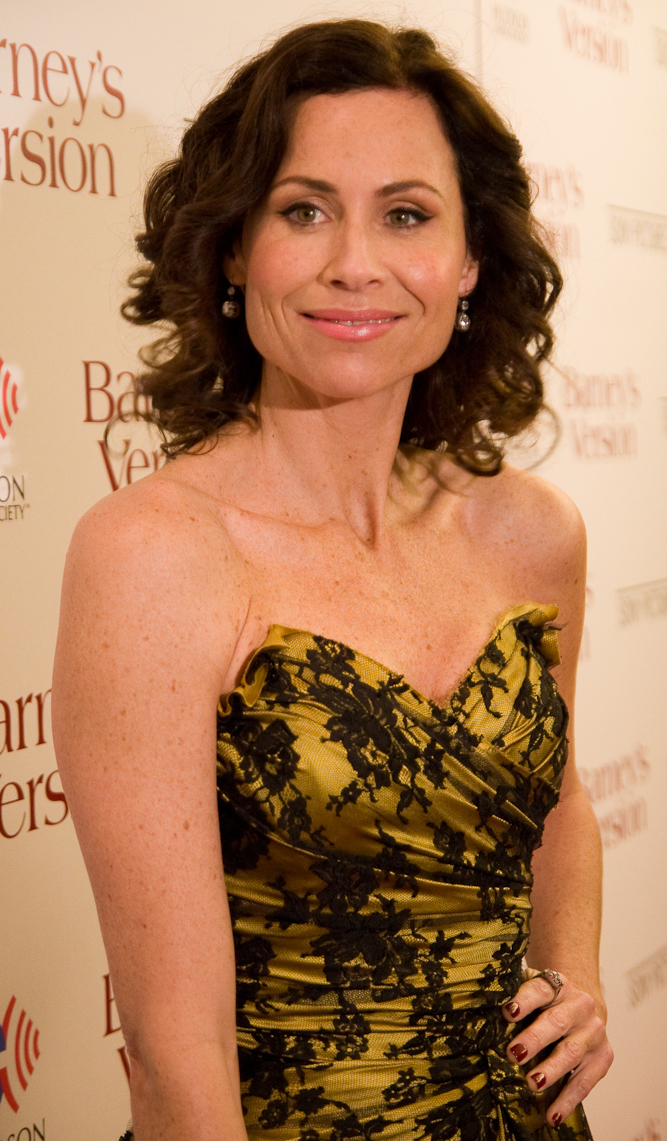
Stellan Skarsgård in 2014 (left) and Minnie Driver (right) in 2011

In early 1997, Bender, Moore, and Van Sant began auditioning actors at the Bowery Hotel in New York, casting Cole Hauser as Billy but struggling to find performers for the roles of Skylar and Lambeau. The team eventually chose actress Minnie Driver for Skylar, with Van Sant saying of her audition: "She just blew us away". However, Driver stated that Weinstein sent a sexist note to the casting director, disagreeing with the team's choice because "nobody would want to fuck" Driver, which left her "devastated" and worried that it might tarnish her career. Weinstein denied Driver's claim regarding the note, but stated that he had wanted to cast Ashley Judd in the role at first. Actor Stellan Skarsgård received the script while shooting Steven Spielberg's 1997 film Amistad and accepted the offer for the role of Lambeau. Van Sant and the production team assumed that Casey would play Morgan, since the role had been written for him by Affleck and Damon and he often spent time with the team. However, Casey initially refused the part to focus on making a documentary of the production, before accepting to appear in Good Will Hunting.

Meanwhile, the production team began scouting locations in Toronto, but realized that some of the scenes had to be shot in Boston to truly capture the city's character. Affleck and Damon guided Skarsgård and Williams around South Boston; one night, the duo brought Williams to the L Street Tavern, attracting a large crowd of residents. Williams liked the gritty atmosphere of the bar and called Weinstein to inform him that he wanted to shoot some of Affleck and Damon's scenes at that bar.

=== Filming ===
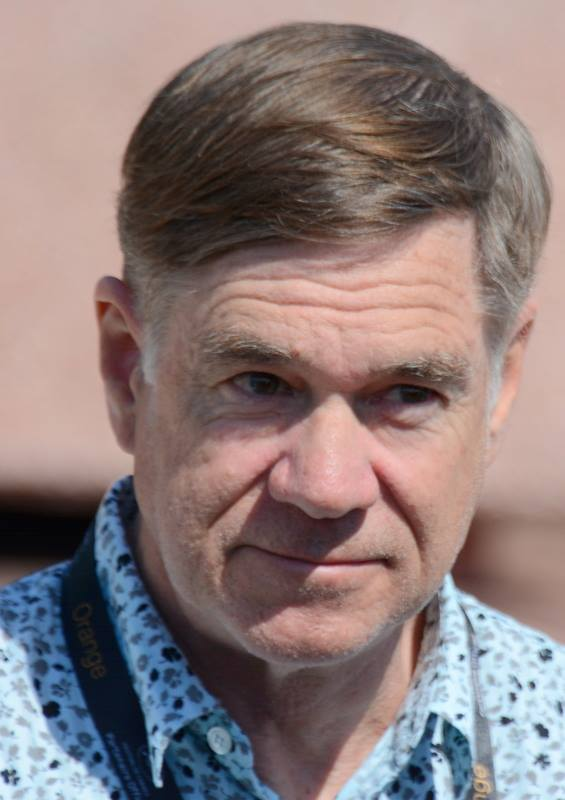
Gus Van Sant in 2015

Filming began on April 14, 1997, and ended nine weeks later. Affleck and Damon let Van Sant take over the development of the narrative and decided to focus on acting. Van Sant's process included rehearsing with the actors, finding an inconspicuous area to place the camera and shooting long scenes without interfering, to get performances and interactions that conveyed a "moment-to-moment honesty" according to Damon. Van Sant tried to accommodate actors: Damon often needed just one take, Affleck liked to try the scenes for a few times, and Williams needed a minimum of seven takes to feel satisfied as he wanted to have versions that focused on different emotions. Several cast members appreciated Van Sant's method: Damon felt that his acting process was "nurtured" by the director, Skarsgård said he gave "the actors space to grow", and Williams found the process "easy", liking that Van Sant stayed in the scene with actors and did not use playback frequently. Williams often improvised lines on set, with one of his additions being the last line of Good Will Hunting: "Son of a bitch stole my line".

Filming took place in Toronto for the interiors and in the Greater Boston area for the exteriors and a few interiors. In Toronto, the production filmed several interior scenes at the University of Toronto, using Knox College, St Michael's College, Victoria College, Whitney Hall, McLennan Physical Laboratories and Faculty Club. Other scenes were shot at the Central Technical School, the Upfront Bar and Grill, and other locations. In Boston, Affleck and his brother along with Damon and Hauser lived in the same apartment and often would hang out with Driver. The cast and crew felt welcomed by the residents of South Boston, with some offering suggestions for what would make the film "more Boston". Van Sant cast Bostonians in small roles, giving the role of Judge Malone to the production's head teamster Jimmy Flynn, a member of the Winter Hill Gang who had previously been tried and acquitted for murder in the same courtroom of the Boston Municipal Court's South Boston Division used in the film. The producers invited the Boston Red Sox's representatives on set, trying to convince them to let the production use their logo and footage of Carlton Fisk's home run at the 1975 World Series. The Major League Baseball had previously refused to allow them to use their own logo and footage, as the film was R-rated due to the presence of profanity, which the production team had then tried to reduce to a minimum. They went on to film several scenes featuring the Red Sox's merchandise and logo, despite receiving their consent only after filming had concluded.

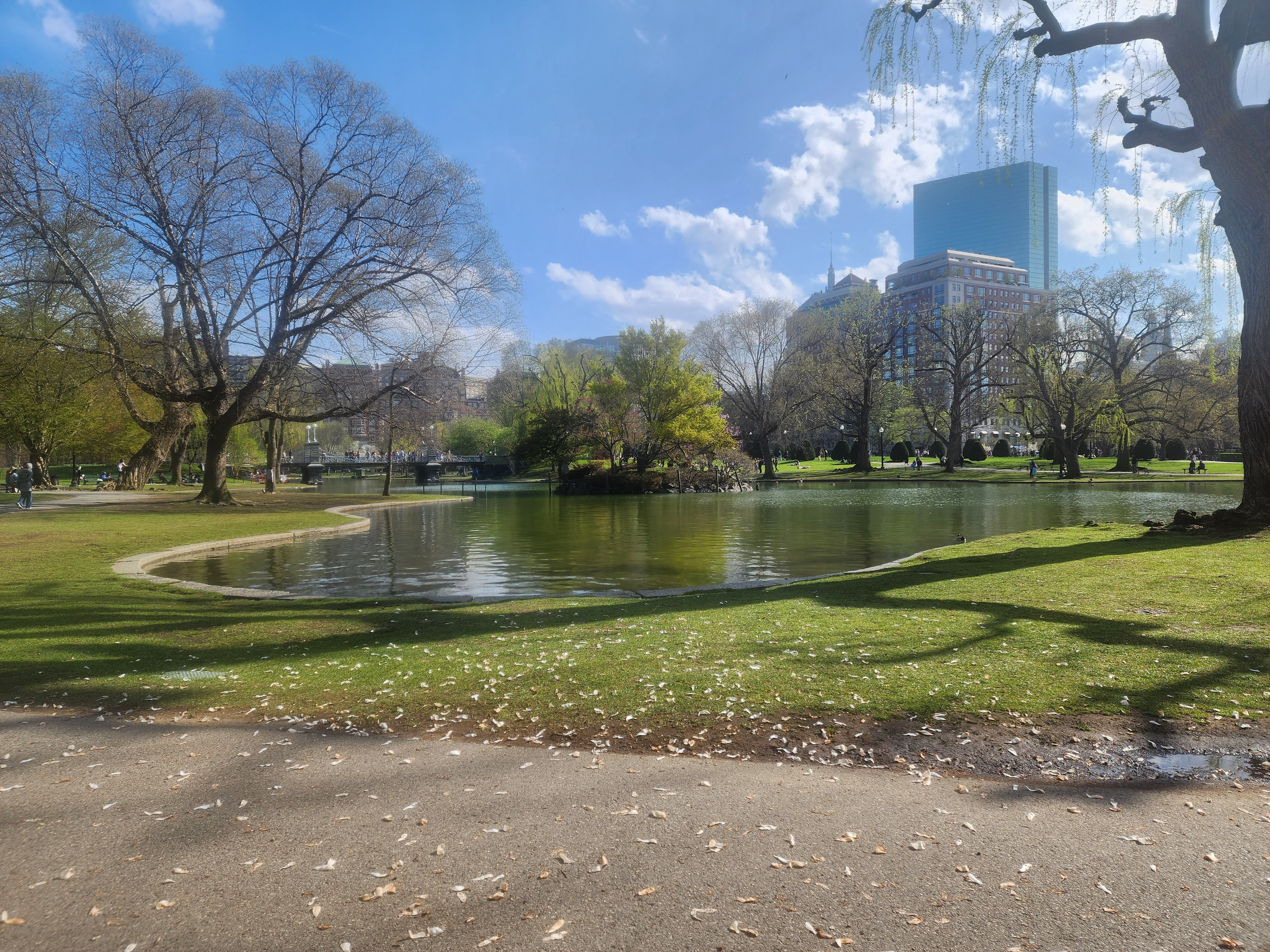
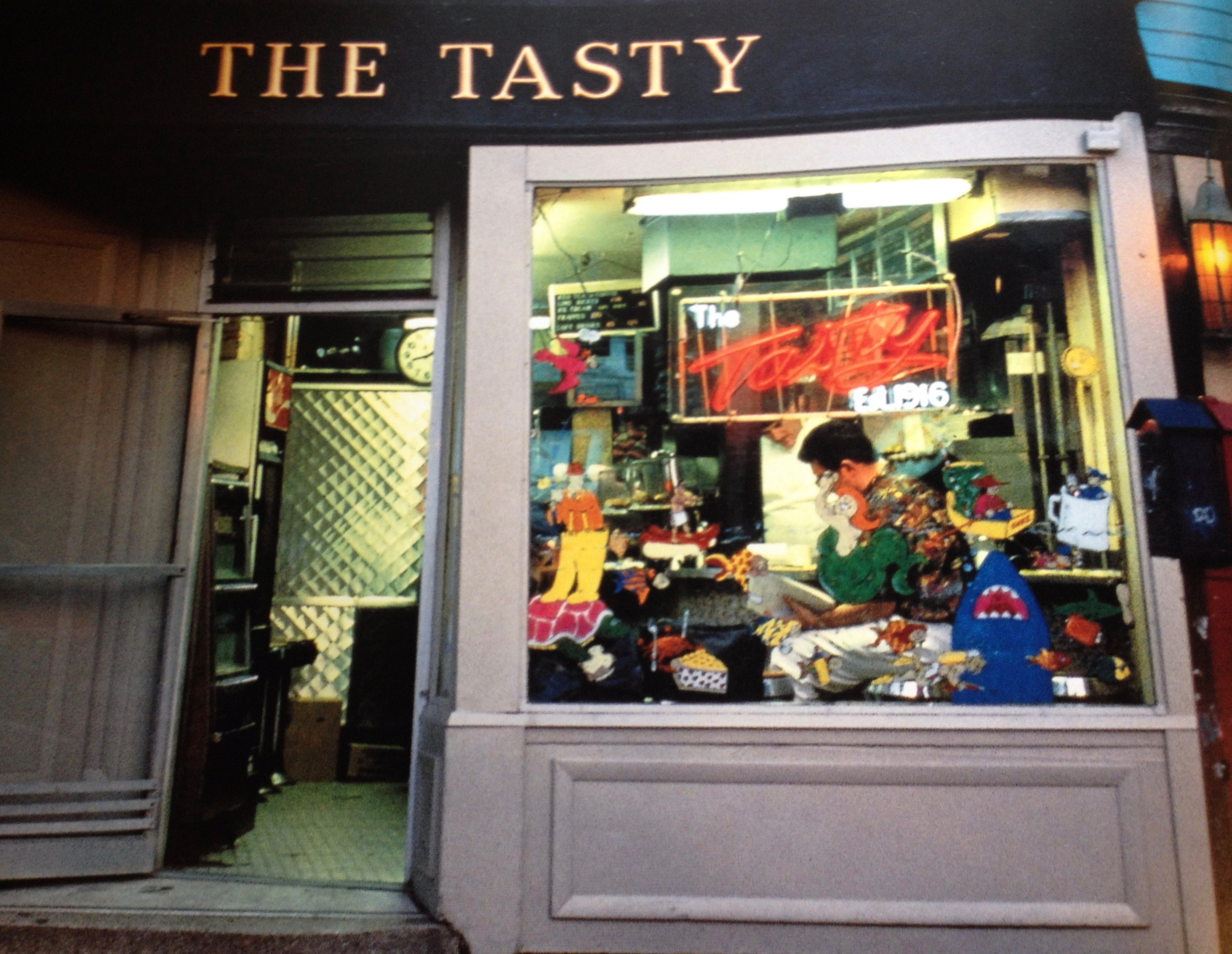
The Boston Public Garden in 2025 (left) and The Tasty (right) in 1996

The marketing team at Miramax wanted to use several chain restaurants as sets, but Affleck and Damon championed distinctive Boston locations like The Tasty and Kelly's Roast Beef. The Harvard administration initially refused to let the production film on campus, but accepted after actor and Harvard alumnus John Lithgow vouched for them, allowing the team to shoot scenes in front of Dunster and Lowell House. The Boston Police Department provided security for the production while Damon and Williams were filming a scene at the Boston Public Garden, which attracted more than 3,000 spectators. Other locations in Boston used or featured in the film include the L Street Tavern, a Dunkin' Donuts and Baskin Robbins combination store, the MIT campus, the Bow and Arrow Pub, an Au Bon Pain store, Harvard Square, and Bunker Hill Community College. The film ends with Will driving away on the Massachusetts Turnpike.

=== Post-production and music ===
Van Sant hired editor Pietro Scalia for Good Will Hunting, having liked his work with directors Bernando Bertolucci and Oliver Stone. Scalia used an Avid Technology editing software on Good Will Hunting. Scalia, Van Sant, and the film's cinematographer Jean-Yves Escoffier worked together to get the final result, starting from an early version that Escoffier and Van Sant thought had too many cuts. In the first version, Van Sant had cut out a scene in which Will uses the phrase "How do you like them apples?", but Affleck and Damon insisted to keep it in the film. Van Sant agreed to it after receiving a positive response to the scene at a screening. Scalia focused on the rhythm of the dialogues and the actors' dialects, trying to convey the film's authenticity. Cutting Williams' performance, he chose to use the actor's first takes, finding that Williams' later cuts did not have "that early freshness, that insecurity, that fear". Surprised by the final result, Williams thanked him in person at an exclusive screening organized for him in San Francisco and in a letter after he won the Academy Award for Best Supporting Actor, saying Scalia had done "the kindest cut".

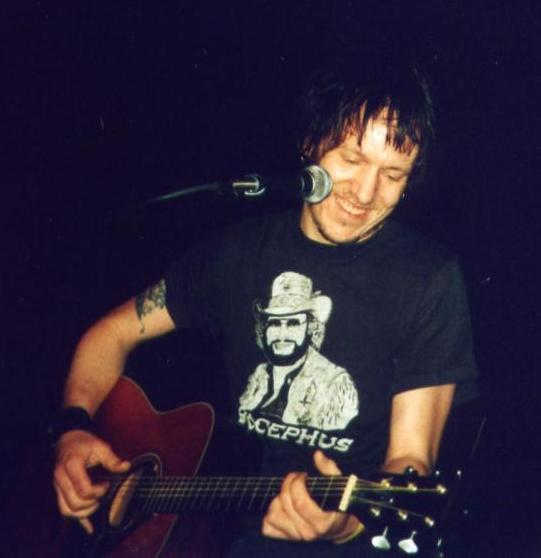
Elliott Smith in 2003

For Good Will Hunting's score, Van Sant worked with film composer Danny Elfman, with whom he had first collaborated on To Die For. At that time, Van Sant had heard of singer-songwriter Elliott Smith while searching for "raw" sounds, but decided that a heavy metal artist would better fit the film. After wrapping production for To Die For, he began listening to Smith's music, thinking it would be a better match with Good Will Hunting. He first talked about it with Bender during pre-production and went on to film with Smith's music in mind, telling Scalia to begin incorporating his songs while editing. Meanwhile, he met with Elfman in Boston to ask for his opinion. Elfman approved and began writing a score to match the songs. Towards the end of the editing process, Van Sant contacted Smith through mutual friends to ask for permission to use his music. Smith agreed after watching the film, which inspired him to write an original song, "Miss Misery", for Good Will Hunting. Elfman, Smith, and Van Sant collaborated to finish the score, blending Smith's songs with Elfman's pieces. Elfman provided the orchestral arrangement for "Between the Bars" and later rearranged "Miss Misery" for Smith's performances at award shows, including the 70th Academy Awards. Elfman recalled it as "the best experience" he had working on music with an artist, adding: "After 110 films, or whatever, it's been one of the only two times I feel I collaborated with anybody".

== Motifs ==
=== Mathematics ===
The main hallway blackboard is used twice to reveal Will's talent, first to the audience, and second to Professor Lambeau. Damon based it on his artist brother Kyle visiting MIT's Infinite Corridor and writing "an incredibly elaborate, totally fake, version of an equation" on a blackboard, which lasted for months. Kyle returned to Matt, saying that MIT needed those blackboards "because these kids are so smart they just need to, you know, drop everything and solve problems!"

Near the start of the film, Will sets aside his mop to study a difficult problem posed by Lambeau on the blackboard. The problem has to do with intermediate-level graph theory, but Lambeau describes it as an advanced "Fourier system". To answer the first part of the question, Will chalks up an adjacency matrix:

$$A=\begin{pmatrix} 0 & 1 & 0& 1 \\ 1 & 0 & 2 & 1 \\ 0 & 2 & 0 & 0 \\ 1 & 1 & 0 & 0 \end{pmatrix}.$$

To answer the second part, he determines the number of 3-step walks in the graph, and finds the third power matrix:

$$A^3=\begin{pmatrix} 2 & 7 & 2 & 3 \\ 7 & 2 & 12 & 7 \\ 2 & 12 & 0 & 2 \\ 3 & 7 & 2 & 2 \end{pmatrix}.$$

The third and fourth parts of the question concern generating functions. The other characters are astounded that a janitor shows such facility with matrices.

The second problem written by Lambeau involves graph theory, asking to draw all series-reduced trees on ten nodes. Will manages to write eight of the ten trees, before Lambeau interrupts him.

=== Religion and social class ===
Several scholars have examined the role of class, religion and the cultural geography of Boston in the film. Jeffrey Herlihy-Mera observed that the residual Catholic–Protestant tensions in Boston are an important backdrop in the film, as Irish Catholics from South Boston are aligned against ostensibly Protestant characters who are affiliated with Harvard and MIT. Emmett Winn has argued that character interactions show class conflict and stunted social mobility, while, similarly, David Lipset commented that class inequality is a driving subtext.

== Release ==
=== Marketing ===
After the end of production in June 1997, Weinstein ordered a test screening for Good Will Hunting. It ended up scoring the highest among all films Miramax had ever produced, leading the studio to move up the film's premiere to December 5, 1997, one week before James Cameron's film Titanic. At the time, Miramax had become renowned in the industry for its relentless marketing campaigns, targeted at winning as many Academy Awards as possible, as a strategy to promote their independent films to wider audiences. At the 69th Academy Awards, the studio had garnered twenty nominations for its 1996 productions, including twelve for The English Patient and two each for Sling Blade and Emma. According to The New York Times, Miramax's strategy that year had involved an advertising campaign in Variety and The Hollywood Reporter, telephone campaigns and screenings to market their lesser-known films to Academy voters, television and radio shows about the production of Miramax films, and a series of cultural events tied to their films. Weinstein had denied that the studio staged extreme marketing campaigns for the Academy Awards, and an executive stated that their marketing strategy aimed to reach large audiences, not win awards. Leading up to the premiere, Miramax used a similarly intense strategy for Good Will Hunting, running a marketing campaign featuring Affleck and Damon that soon led them to become exhausted. Despite being understanding of the studio's motivations, Damon later said: "The whole experience was overwhelming, very unhealthy."

=== Theatrical run ===
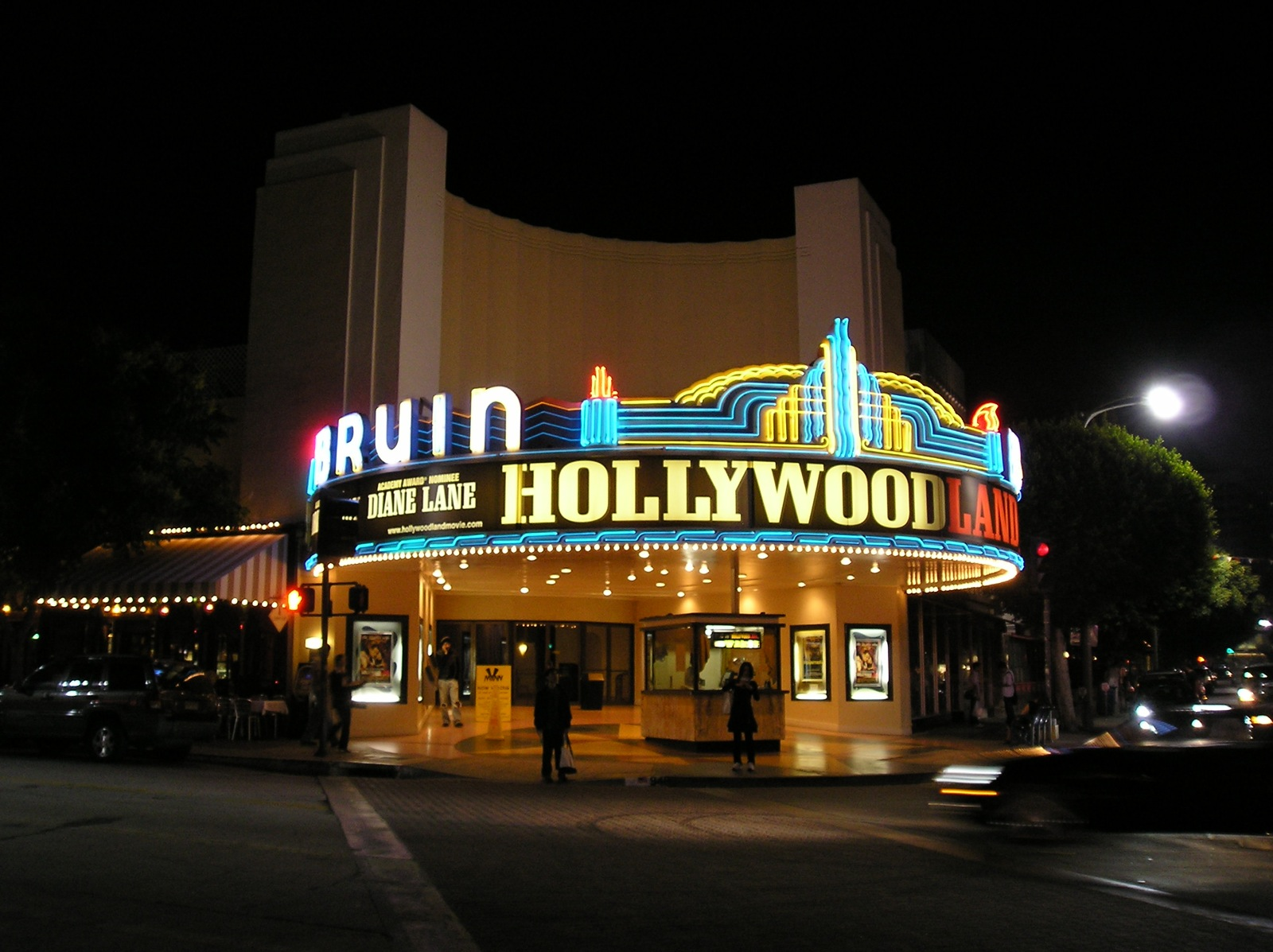
The Bruin Theater in 2006

Good Will Hunting premiered on December 2, 1997, at the Bruin Theater in Westwood Village, Los Angeles. In the United States, the film received a limited release in seven theaters across New York and Los Angeles on December 5, 1997, grossing $272,912 in its opening weekend. In its fourth weekend of release, it grossed $1,720,540 from 157 theaters. Two weeks later, Good Will Hunting received a wide release across 1,787 theaters, grossing $14,844,684 and finishing as the number-two film of the week behind Titanic. In its eight week, it grossed $11,218,707 and began to fall in the rankings, finishing as the number-three film of the week behind Titanic and Spice World. By the following week, the film had earned a total gross of over $60 million. In the week following the announcement of Good Will Hunting's nominations at the 70th Academy Awards, it earned $11,075,873—a 23.8% increase—and finished as the number-four film of the week behind Titanic and two new releases, The Wedding Singer and Sphere. In its fourteenth week, the film's total gross surpassed the 100 million mark.

Williams' deal dictated that at that point he would begin receiving a bigger percentage of the first-dollar gross profits. Miramax had reached a point where it became more advantageous for them to release the film on home video, instead of paying the cost of running advertisings in publications and keeping the film in theaters. Weinstein asked Damon to convince Williams to renegotiate the deal so the film would stay in theaters, with the promise that Miramax would keep promoting it with the goal of reaching a total gross of $150 million. After Damon refused, Weinstein and Miramax first scaled back on the number of theaters in which it played, before definitively pulling it from theaters. Good Will Hunting left theaters in its thirty-third week of release, having grossed $138.4 million against a budget ranging from $10 to $16 million and spent thirteen consecutive weeks among the top ten highest-grossing films.

Affleck, Damon, and Van Sant were also owed shares of the film's revenue, equivalent to 2.5% of the adjusted gross for Van Sant and a percentage of the net profit for Affleck and Damon. Van Sant stated that Miramax did not pay it and that Weinstein told him that Williams' deal had depleted their resources, but Weinstein denied the claims. Affleck and Damon also did not receive their share, as Miramax told them that their accounting department had reported that the film had lost $50 million. Both were later given a bonus of $500,000 each. Damon stated: "I don't ever look back on that experience and feel ripped off. Maybe if I had never worked again after that, [..] But it wasn't a onetime thing. I'm still benefiting from that experience."

=== Home media ===
Good Will Hunting was first released on home video on July 7, 1998. Over the course of that year, the film received releases on formats LaserDisc, DIVX, and DVD, with the latter being a collector's edition that included audio commentary by Affleck, Damon, and Van Sant, eleven deleted scenes with commentary, a promotional featurette on the film's production, and a music video. In June 2011, it became available on streaming through the subscription video-on-demand services Hulu and Netflix. In August 2011, Good Will Hunting was first made available on the home video format Blu-ray. A year later, the film received a second Blu-Ray release for its fifteenth anniversary that included previously released bonus content, a retrospective documentary on the film's development and reception, and a featurette of an interview with Damon, talking about its production and impact on his life. In August 2025, Good Will Hunting appeared in Netflix's list of the top ten most-watched films of the week.

== Reception ==
=== Critical response ===
Good Will Hunting received widespread acclaim from critics. Roger Ebert of the Chicago Sun-Times gave the film three stars out of four, writing that while the story is "predictable", it is "the individual moments, not the payoff, that make it so effective".

Duane Byrge of The Hollywood Reporter praised the performances of the cast, writing, "The acting is brilliant overall, with special praise to Matt Damon for his ragingly tender portrayal of the boy cursed with genius."

Peter Stack of the San Francisco Chronicle was equally positive, writing, "The glow goes well beyond a radiant performance by Matt Damon ... Intimate, heartfelt and wickedly funny, it's a movie whose impact lingers."

Owen Gleiberman, writing for Entertainment Weekly, gave the film a "B", stating, "Good Will Hunting is stuffed – indeed, overstuffed – with heart, soul, audacity, and blarney. You may not believe a minute of it, but you don't necessarily want to stop watching." He also noted Damon's and Williams' chemistry, describing it as "a quicksilver intercepting each other's thoughts".

Janet Maslin of The New York Times called the screenplay "smart and touching", and praised Van Sant for directing with "style, shrewdness and clarity". She also complimented the production design and cinematography, which were able to effortlessly move the viewer from "classroom to dorm room to neighborhood bar", in a small setting.

Quentin Curtis of The Daily Telegraph opined that Williams' performance brought "sharpness and tenderness", calling the film a "crowd-pleaser, with bags of charm to spare. It doesn't bear thinking too much about its message ... Damon and Affleck's writing has real wit and vigour, and some depth."

Andrew O'Hehir of Salon stated that despite the "enjoyable characters", he thought that the film was somewhat superficial, writing, "there isn't a whole lot of movie to take home with you ... many will wake the next morning wondering why, with all that talent on hand, it amounts to so little in the end."

Writing for the BBC, Nev Pierce gave the film four stars out of five, describing it as "touching, without being sentimental", although he felt that some scenes were "odd lapses into self-help speak".

Emanuel Levy of Variety called the film a "beautifully realized tale ... engaging and often quite touching". He felt that the film's visual style showcased Van Sant's talent, but the plot was "quite predictable".

On the review aggregator Rotten Tomatoes, the film holds an approval rating of 97%, based on 91 reviews, with an average rating of 8.10/10. The website's critical consensus reads: "It follows a predictable narrative arc, but Good Will Hunting adds enough quirks to the journey – and is loaded with enough powerful performances – that it remains an entertaining, emotionally rich drama." On Metacritic, the film has a weighted average score of 71 out of 100, based on 28 critics, indicating "generally favorable" reviews. Audiences surveyed by CinemaScore gave the film an average grade of "A" on a scale of A+ to F.

=== Accolades ===
At the 70th Academy Awards, Good Will Hunting and its cast and crew won Best Original Screenplay (for Affleck and Damon) and Best Supporting Actor (for Williams) and received nominations for Best Actor (for Damon), Best Director (for Van Sant), Best Film Editing (for Scalia), Best Original Dramatic Score (for Elfman), Best Original Song (for Smith's "Miss Misery"), Best Picture, and Best Supporting Actress (for Driver). At the age of twenty-five, Affleck became the youngest person ever to have won an Academy Award for screenwriting, with Damon being the second youngest person at age twenty-seven. However, rumors had begun to spread ahead of the Academy Awards ceremony that the script had not been written by Affleck and Damon, but by Goldman. Damon refused to address it in interviews at the time, feeling insulted.

Affleck and Damon also won the Critics' Choice Movie Award for Best Original Screenplay and the Golden Globe Award for Best Screenplay, among others. Williams won the Screen Actors Guild Award for Outstanding Performance by a Male Actor in a Supporting Role. Skarsgård received the European Film Academy Achievement in World Cinema Award.

=== Box office analysis ===
Worldwide, Good Will Hunting grossed $225.9 million. In the United States, it surpassed Pulp Fiction (1994) as Miramax's most successful release ever at the box office and became the seventh highest-grossing film of 1997. Director Curtis Hanson contextualized the film's success as part of a commercial and critical resurgence of character-driven narratives, along with the 1997 films As Good as It Gets and The Full Monty. Industry insiders and experts had predicted that the year would have been dominated by major film studios' productions, but they noted that the unexpected success of Good Will Hunting and other independent films balanced out 1997 and demonstrated the continued commercial and critical strength of independent studios' productions, which had already commanded 1996. The film was evaluated as a successful example of counterprogramming, having been released nearly at the same time as the box-office hit Titanic. Commentators recognized Miramax and other independent studios' ability to generate bigger returns than major studios by casting newcomers or former A-list actors and finding ignored scripts, allowing them to produce films at a low cost. However, some argued that Miramax productions could not be considered independent films in the traditional sense due to their relatively high budgets, while others noted that they were still much inferior to that of major studios' productions.

== Legacy ==
=== Cultural influence ===
After the Academy Awards ceremony, rumors that Affleck and Damon had not written the script continued to spread. Goldman repeatedly denied the claim in interviews and in his 2000 memoir Which Lie Did I Tell?. In 2003, the rumors were used as the premise of the play Matt & Ben, written by actresses Mindy Kaling and Brenda Withers, in which the script of Good Will Hunting fell from the ceiling of Affleck's apartment. The production was staged as part of the New York Fringe Festival, with Kaling and Withers playing Affleck and Damon respectively. Bruce Weber of The New York Times reviewed it positively when it was presented again off-Broadway.

=== Personal impact ===
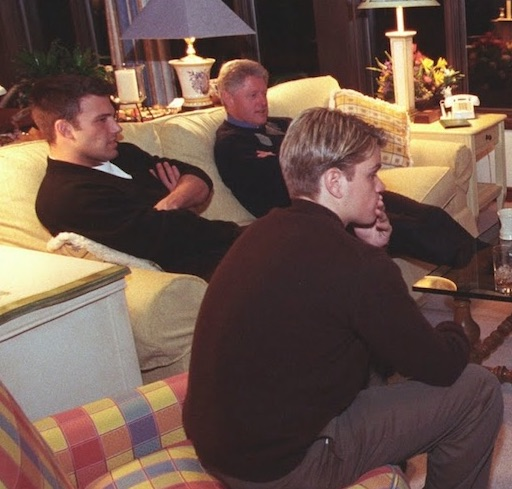
Affleck and Damon at a screening with President Bill Clinton in 1998

Good Will Hunting launched the acting careers of Affleck and Damon. Affleck, Damon, and Kevin Smith were able to find funding for Smith's 1999 film Dogma due to Good Will Hunting and Chasing Amy's success. However, audiences came to associate Affleck to popcorn films and Damon to intellectual drama films due to their characters' opposite personalities and the genre of the actors' subsequent projects in 1998, which were Michael Bay's Armageddon for Affleck and Spielberg's Saving Private Ryan for Damon. Saturday Night Live later aired a sketch portraying Affleck as unintelligent and ignorant. Damon noted that "it was terrifically unfair" and that it took for Affleck to start directing his own films and winning an Academy Award to change the misconception.

Affleck and Damon appeared together in several films over the next decades, but resumed their screenwriting collaboration only years later with the production of Ridley Scott's 2021 film The Last Duel, saying that Good Will Hunting had taken them so long to finish that it had deterred them from committing to other screenwriting projects. In 2023, Affleck was offered an opportunity to participate in the production of a sequel for Good Will Hunting, but stated that neither he nor Damon would pursue the project.

The film also brought Elliott Smith to national prominence following his nomination and performance at the 70th Academy Awards for Best Original Song. His label, Kill Rock Stars, was able to pay its debts after Smith's rise in popularity. However, Smith did not enjoy fame and shied away from it. Smith went on to release two more subsequent albums before his death in 2003. Posthumously, his music has often been featured on soundtracks for film and television.

== Music ==
The film features a score by film composer Danny Elfman, with additional songs provided by singer-songwriter Elliott Smith. It was first issued in 1997 as a soundtrack album featuring only two of Elfman's pieces, before a version with all his pieces was released in 2014.

=== Soundtrack ===
A soundtrack album for the film was released by Capitol Records on November 18, 1997, although only two of Elfman's cues appear on the release.

Good Will Hunting: Music from the Miramax Motion Picture
No.	Title	Music	Length
1.	"Between the Bars (Orchestral)"	Elliott Smith	1:09
2.	"As the Rain"	Jeb Loy Nichols	4:51
3.	"Angeles"	Elliott Smith	2:55
4.	"No Name #3"	Elliott Smith	3:10
5.	"Fisherman's Blues"	The Waterboys	4:19
6.	"Why Do I Lie?"	Luscious Jackson	3:27
7.	"Will Hunting" (Main Titles)"	Danny Elfman	2:41
8.	"Between the Bars"	Elliott Smith	2:21
9.	"Say Yes"	Elliott Smith	2:15
10.	"Baker Street"	Gerry Rafferty	4:08
11.	"Somebody's Baby"	Andru Donalds	3:10
12.	"Boys Better"	The Dandy Warhols	4:32
13.	"How Can You Mend a Broken Heart?"	Al Green	6:18
14.	"Miss Misery"	Elliott Smith	3:12
15.	"Weepy Donuts"	Danny Elfman	3:48
Total length:			52:16

"Afternoon Delight" by the Starland Vocal Band and "Runaway" by Del Shannon were featured in the film but did not appear on the soundtrack album.

=== Score ===
A limited-edition album featuring Elfman's complete score from the film was released by Music Box Records on March 3, 2014. The album includes all of Elfman's cues (including music not featured on the rare Miramax Academy promo) and contains the songs by Elliott Smith. One of the tracks is Smith's songs with Elfman's arrangements added to the mix. Only 1500 copies were created.

=== Reception ===
In a 2009 retrospective review of Good Will Hunting's soundtrack, Alex Young of Consequence called Elfman and Smith's collaboration a "tremendous example of composer and contemporary musician weaving together their creativity". He appreciated the dichotomy between Smith's gentle music and Will's tough exterior, which concealed his vulnerability. In a 2015 review, Bernard Zuel of The Sydney Morning Herald gave the soundtrack three stars and a half out of five, saying that Smith's songs overshadowed Elfman's score.

== See also ==
- George Dantzig—a mathematician, protagonist of an urban legend that resembles Good Will Hunting's introductory scenes
- List of films about mathematicians

== Bibliography ==
- Axelrod, Mark (2004). Character and Conflict: The Cornerstones of Screenwriting. Heinemann. ISBN 9780325006970.
- Beck, Bernard (1999). "Orphans of the Storm: Smoke Signals and Other Explorations of How to Survive in Your Native Land...". Multicultural Perspectives. 1 (2). National Association for Multicultural Education: 25–28. doi:10.1080/15210969909539898.
- Brenkman, John (February 2011). "Bruce Robbins, Upward Mobility and the Common Good: Toward a Literary History of the Welfare State". Modern Philology. 108 (3). University of Chicago Press: 204–209. doi:10.1086/659008.
- Cesaratto, Todd (December 2006). "The Good Will Hunting Technique". Communication & Critical/Cultural Studies. 3 (4). National Communication Association: 307–328. doi:10.1080/14791420600984185.
- Cooper, Anna (December 2015). "Representative Men: Moral Perfectionism, Masculinity and Psychoanalysis in Good Will Hunting". Film-Philosophy. 19 (1). Edinburgh University Press: 270–288. doi:10.3366/film.2015.0015.
- Denby, David (December 8, 1997). "Matt City". New York. New York Media. p. 62.
- Golfman, Noreen (1998). "Getting Ahead of the Class: Reflections on Good Will Hunting". Labour / Le Travail. 42. Athabasca University Press, Canadian Committee on Labour History: 323–327. doi:10.2307/25148926. JSTOR 25148926.
- Groff, Christopher D. (November 2004). How (West) Hollywood Adds Up: A Queer Theoretical View of Mathematics and Mathematicians in Film. American Studies Association Annual Conference: Crossroads of Cultures. College of the Pacific Faculty Presentations. University of the Pacific.
- Herlihy-Mera, Jeffrey (2012). "Revisioning Migration: On the Stratifications of Irish Boston in Good Will Hunting". Alif: Journal of Comparative Poetics (32). American University in Cairo Press: 206–227. JSTOR 41850745.
- Hopkins, Susan; Balloo, Kieran; Ramos, Fabiane; Salmeron, Raquel; Singh, Niharika; Wilson, Victoria E. (August 2024). "True Encounters with the Fictional University: Collectively Rewriting the Script of Filmic Dark Academia from the Academic Margins". Culture & Organization. 42. Routledge: 1–17. doi:10.1080/14759551.2024.2394461.
- Koch, Gary; Dollarhide, Collette T. (March 2000). "Using a Popular Film in Counselor Education: Good Will Hunting as a Teaching Tool". Counselor Education and Supervision. 39 (3). Blackwell Publishing: 203–210. doi:10.1002/j.1556-6978.2000.tb01232.x.
- Levy, Emanuel (1999). Cinema of Outsiders: The Rise of American Independent Film. New York University Press. ISBN 9780814765203.
- Lipset, David (2021). "Comedy and Other Hollywood Tropes of American Social Stratification (1990–2011)". Visual Anthropology. 34 (5). Routledge: 405–422. doi:10.1080/08949468.2021.1984806.
- Mendick, Heather; Moreau, Marie-Pierre (2013). "From Good Will Hunting to Deal or No Deal". In Ineson, Gwen; Povey, Hilary (eds.). Debates in Mathematics Education. Routledge. pp. 17–27. ISBN 9780367074982.
- Moreau, Marie-Pierre; Mendick, Heather; Epstein, Debbie (2009). "Constructions of Mathematical Masculinities in Popular Culture". In Watson, Elwood (ed.). Pimps, Wimps, Studs, Thugs and Gentlemen: Essays on Media Images of Masculinity. McFarland & Company. pp. 141–156. ISBN 9780786443055.
- O'Donnell, William J.; Gibbs, Richard A. (October 2005). "Good Will Hunting Meets Graphing Calculators and CAS". The Mathematics Teacher. 99 (3). National Council of Teachers of Mathematics: 218–222. doi:10.5951/MT.99.3.0218. JSTOR 27971925.
- Polster, Burkard (2012). Math Goes to the Movies. Johns Hopkins University Press. ISBN 9781421404837.
- Rees, Richard (1999). "Good Will Hunting or Wild Goose Chase?: Masculinities and the Myth of Class Mobility". Journal of Narrative Theory. 29 (2). Eastern Michigan University: 228–240. doi:10.1353/jnt.2011.0019. JSTOR 30225729.
- Riley, Tracy (1998). "Two Thumbs Up, Five Stars, and an Oscar?". Gifted Child Today. 21 (6). Sage Publishing: 46–51. doi:10.1177/107621759802100614.
- Ziewacz, Lawrence E. (2001). "Holden Caulfield, Alex Portnoy, and Good Will Hunting: Coming of Age in American Films and Novels". Journal of Popular Culture. 35 (1). Blackwell Publishing: 211–218. doi:10.1111/j.0022-3840.2001.3501_211.x.
