= Ben Affleck and Matt Damon =

American filmmaking duo

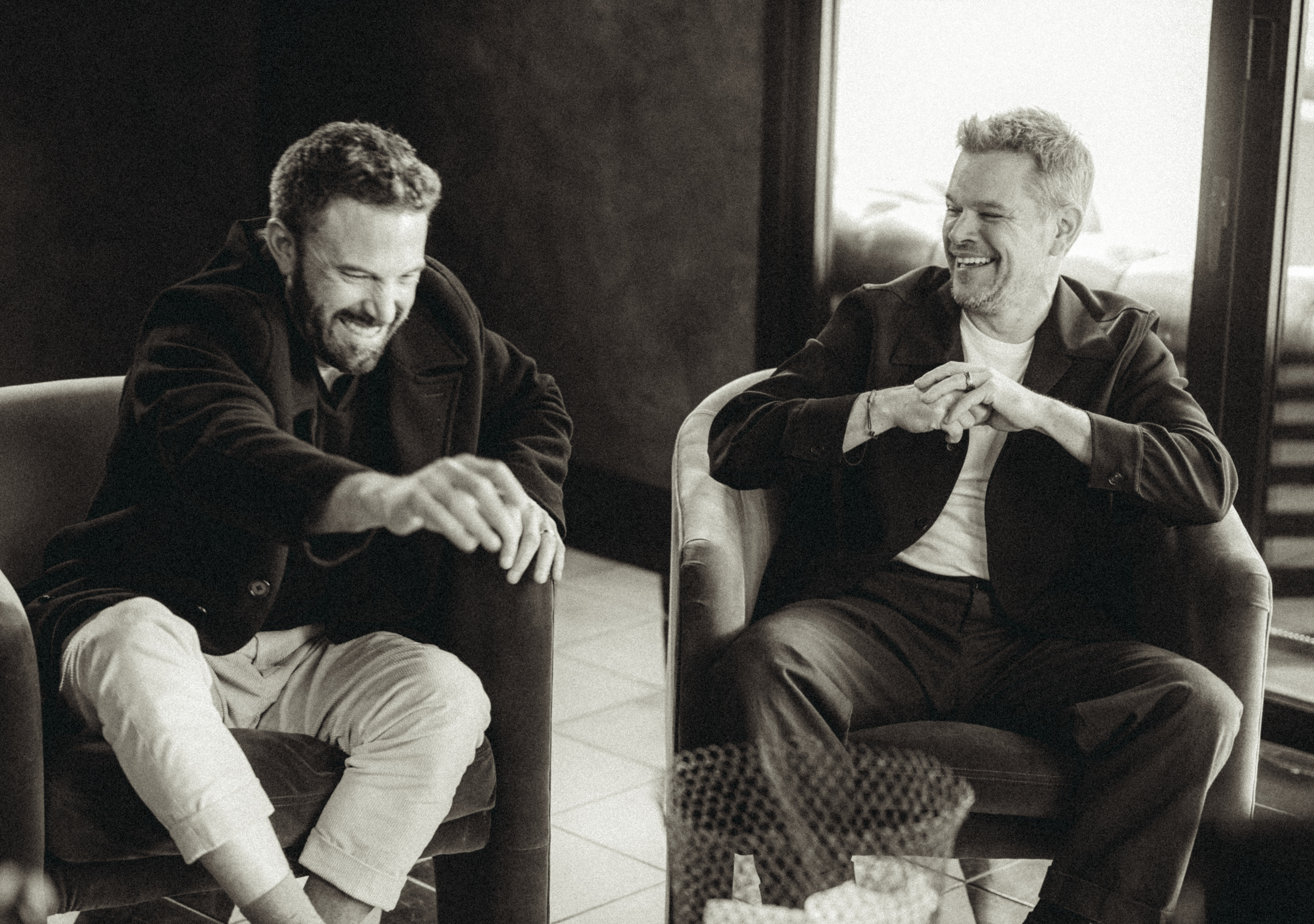
Affleck (left) and Damon (right) in 2023

Ben Affleck and Matt Damon are American actors, screenwriters, and producers from Cambridge, Massachusetts, who have frequently collaborated throughout their careers. The duo first gained recognition in 1997 after they won the Academy Award for Best Original Screenplay for Good Will Hunting, which they wrote and starred in together. Since then, they have kept a close public relationship, often working on projects and establishing businesses with one another.

== Early years ==
I was 8, he was 10, he was a big kid, he played baseball, he was really cool, he had a bowl cut—those little feathered ones that we all wanted, of course—and he— And he was, you know, nice to me. And we were both interested in the same things. Just kids who grew up two blocks apart and both wanted to be actors.

— Ben Affleck, SmartLess, 2023

Damon's mother, Lesley University professor Nancy Carlsson Paige, and Affleck's mother, schoolteacher Chris Affleck-Boldt, had known each other professionally for some time when, in 1980, they introduced their sons to one another during a playdate at Affleck's home. At the time, Damon was 10 years old, and Affleck was 8. Their homes were two blocks from each other in the same Cambridge neighborhood; the two later named their production company, Pearl Street Films, after the Cambridge street they walked on to visit one another.

The two became close during their high school years at Cambridge Rindge and Latin School, a public high school with a prominent drama department. Damon says that their friendship solidified during a pick-up football game in 1986, when Affleck, "at the risk of his own life", intervened in a fight between Damon and a much larger and older student. That same year, in a school production of The Visit, Damon, then a junior, played freshman Affleck's father. In 1987, Damon starred in a school production of Pippin, while Affleck, who could not sing, worked in the crew.

The two aspired to become professional actors, holding "business lunches" in their school's cafeteria and opening a joint checking account to fund the cost of traveling from Boston to New York City for auditions. The password for this account was RiverP, an homage to actor River Phoenix, whom Damon and Affleck both admired. Among the films for which they unsuccessfully auditioned was Dead Poets Society; in 1990, they worked together at Cambridge's now-closed Janus Theater, which screened the film exclusively all summer. In 1989, the duo played extras in Field of Dreams. Recalls actor Kevin Costner, "[Damon and Affleck] would both lean in at the same time, lean back at the same time, look at each other at the same time. We talked, and they had this big enthusiasm. They were on fire."

== Education ==
In a 2007 episode of Inside the Actors Studio, Damon revealed that he'd been accepted to Columbia University, Carnegie Mellon University, and Harvard University, ultimately choosing Harvard. He enrolled in 1988 and studied English. During a course in which he was tasked with writing a one-act play, he wrote the beginnings of what would become Good Will Hunting.

Affleck enrolled at the University of Vermont in 1990, owing to what he describes as "unrequited love for a high school girlfriend." Soon after classes begun, he fractured his hip during a game of intramural basketball, an injury which required him to move about on crutches. Describing the period as "the worst two and a half months of [his] life," Affleck eventually called Damon at Thanksgiving, saying, "'You've got to pick me up! I can't walk that well. Come and get me now!'" Damon drove to Vermont later that day, retrieving Affleck and bringing him back to Boston. Affleck did not re-enroll, instead beginning a period of Middle Eastern Studies at Occidental College.

== Relationship ==
=== Good Will Hunting ===
While studying at Harvard University, Damon was tasked with writing a script, in which he asked Affleck to assist in presenting to his class. After dropping out, Damon moved into Affleck's apartment in Los Angeles and the two expanded on the assignment, writing what would become Good Will Hunting. The film was met with widespread critical acclaim, with critics praising both Affleck and Damon's performances and writing. It went on to win the pair their first Oscars, for Best Original Screenplay and, in 2014, was featured on The Hollywood Reporter's "100 Favorite Films" list.

=== Other films ===
As of 2026, the pair has collaborated on a total of 17 films, many of which received overwhelmingly positive reviews. In alignment with their work with Miramax and Kevin Smith, they have occasionally parodied their past roles.

Title	Release date	Production studio(s)	Rotten Tomatoes	Notes
Field of Dreams	May 5, 1989	Gordon Company	88%	First professional collaboration, both uncredited
School Ties	September 18, 1992	Jaffe/Lansing Production	60%	
Glory Daze	September 27, 1996	Seventh Art Productions		Starring Affleck with a minor role played by Damon
Good Will Hunting	December 5, 1997	Be Gentleman	97%	Written by Affleck and Damon
Chasing Amy	April 4, 1997	View Askew Productions	87%	
Dogma	November 12, 1999	View Askew Productions and STKstudio	67%	
Jay and Silent Bob Strike Back	August 24, 2001	Dimension Films, Miramax, and View Askew Productions	52%	Both play a satirical version of themselves, parodying a scene from Good Will Hunting.
Jersey Girl	March 9, 2004	View Askew Productions	42%	Starring Affleck with minor supporting role played by Damon
Jay and Silent Bob Reboot	October 15, 2019	View Askew Productions, Miramax, Destro Films, Mewesings, SMODCO, Hideout Pictures, Intercut Capital, and Skit Bags Entertainment	64%	Affleck satirically reprises his role as Holden McNeil, while Damon makes references to his role as Loki
The Last Duel	October 15, 2021	20th Century Studios, Scott Free Productions and Pearl Street Films	85%	Screenplay by Affleck, Damon, and Nicole Holofcener. Only Pearl Street Films production featuring both company founders.
Air	April 5, 2023	Amazon Studios, Skydance Sports, Artists Equity, Studio 8 and Mandalay Pictures	93%	Directed by Affleck. Co-produced by the duo's new independent venture Artists Equity
The Instigators	August 2, 2024	Apple Studios, Artists Equity, Studio 8 and The Walsh Company	40%	Starring Damon. Produced by Damon and Affleck. Co-produced by the duo's new independent venture Artists Equity.
Small Things Like These	November 1, 2024	Lionsgate, Artists Equity and Big Things Films	94%	Executive produced by Affleck and produced by Damon. Co-produced by the duo's new independent venture Artists Equity.
Unstoppable	December 6, 2024	Amazon MGM Studios and Artists Equity	77%	Executive produced by Damon and produced by Affleck. Co-produced by the duo's new independent venture Artists Equity.
The Accountant 2	April 25, 2025	Metro-Goldwyn-Mayer, Warner Bros. Pictures, Artists Equity, 51 Entertainment, Zero Gravity Management and Filmtribe	86%	Starring Affleck. Executive produced by Damon and produced by Affleck. Co-produced by the duo's new independent venture Artists Equity.
Kiss of the Spider Woman	October 10, 2025	Lionsgate, Roadside Attractions, LD Entertainment, Artists Equity, Mohari Media, Josephson Entertainment, Tom Kirdahy Productions, Nuyorican Productions	82%	Executive produced by Damon and Affleck. Co-produced by the duo's new independent venture Artists Equity.
The Rip	January 16, 2026	Netflix	77%	Co-produced via Artists Equity and starring the duo

=== Business ventures ===
In 1996, Affleck and Damon started its very first production company, Pearl Street Productions, which was based at Miramax Films. After just four years, the company was dissolved in 2000 and shifted their focus onto their own company, LivePlanet, which was then dissolved in 2008. In 2010, Affleck and Damon established Pearl Street Films, a film and production company based at Warner Bros. Studios. After 12 years, the company was dissolved in 2022 with the final production being The Last Duel, a film starring the two founders. The duo instead shifted their focus onto their own independent film company, Artists Equity, which was founded in 2022. In 2023, the new studio released its first film, Air, which was directed by Affleck and starring them both, with Damon playing the lead role.

=== Public image ===
As a result of their shared upbringing and frequent collaboration, Affleck and Damon's friendship has garnered a lot of public attention, with Us Weekly dubbing it "a bromance worth celebrating." The two frequently mention one another in interviews and other public forums, including hosting political fundraisers together. On his relationship with Damon, Affleck said: "This friendship has been essential and defining and so important to me in my life. There were a few critical times, which are private and I don’t want to share, but where [Damon's] support was so profoundly meaningful to me that I don’t think I would’ve been able to be successful without it.” Referencing his experience working with Affleck again on The Last Duel, Damon said "Why aren't we doing this more often? And getting into your 50s you just go: if we don't make it a priority, it just isn't going to happen.", seemingly alluding to more collaborations between the two coming in the future.

=== Marketing ===
The Damon–Affleck relationship is referenced in a 2023 Dunkin' Donuts commercial featuring Affleck. It was referenced in a 2025 Stella Artois commercial that aired during Super Bowl LIX.

== See also ==
- Damon–Kimmel feud – long-running satirical feud between Damon and Jimmy Kimmel
- Matt & Ben is a satirical play written by Mindy Kaling and Brenda Withers in 2002.
- Vulgar auteurism – several of their films are in this article
- Blockbuster cinema
- Indiewood – several of their films are also in this article
- Schwarzenegger–Stallone rivalry
