= Kayfabe =

Portrayal of professional wrestling events as being real

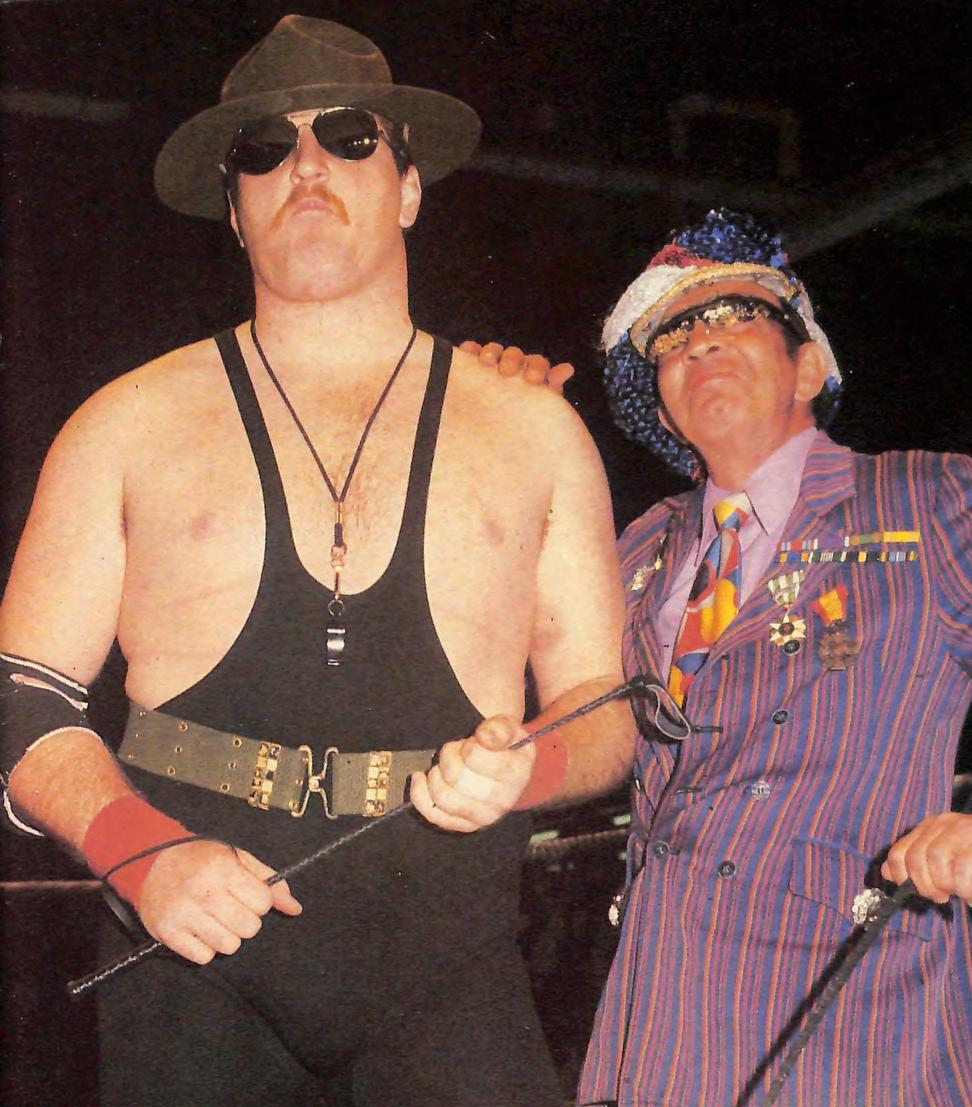
Sgt. Slaughter and The Grand Wizard, both wrestling characters

Kayfabe (Note: Pronounced /ˈkeɪfeɪb/ KAY-fayb.) is the portrayal of staged elements within professional wrestling (such as characters, rivalries, and storylines) as legitimate or real. Although initially a wrestling term, kayfabe has also been used to describe any suspension of disbelief or pretense of reality that deliberately blurs the lines between fact and fiction.

Kayfabe is essential to creating and maintaining the non-wrestling aspects of the industry; similar to other fictional entertainment; a wrestler breaking kayfabe is analogous to an actor breaking character. Since wrestling is performed in front of a live audience, kayfabe can be compared to the fourth wall in acting, as little to no conventional fourth wall exists in wrestling to begin with.

Kayfabe was fiercely maintained for decades with the intent to deceive fans, and the lack of a conventional fourth wall often led to wrestlers being expected to maintain their characters even when living their everyday lives. With the advent of the Internet and the sports entertainment movement, the wrestling industry has become less concerned with protecting its secrets and typically maintains kayfabe only during live events and the filming of television shows. Kayfabe is even broken during shows on occasion, usually when paying tribute to deceased and retired wrestlers or when a serious injury genuinely occurs during a match.

== Usage ==
Kayfabe is a shorthand term that involves acknowledging the staged, scripted nature of professional wrestling, as opposed to a competitive sport, despite being presented as authentic. Initially, people "in the business" (either wrestlers or those working behind the scenes) used the term kayfabe as a code among those in the wrestling profession, discussing matters in public without revealing the scripted nature. As a concept, kayfabe involves both the fact that matches are scripted and that wrestlers portray characters for their shows. Unlike actors who portray their characters only when on set or on stage, professional wrestlers often stay "in character" outside the shows, especially when interacting with fans, trying to preserve the illusion of professional wrestling. In contrast, something that is not kayfabe, be it a fight or a statement, is referred to as a "shoot".

I remember the guy who would bring our jackets back to the dressing room. Every time he did, someone would yell "Kayfabe." ... Then one night, the guy decided to stand up for himself and told the whole dressing room: "I don't mind the yelling, but I want to let you know that my name is not Kayfabe. It's Mark." ... What he didn't know is that wrestlers called people outside of the business "marks"—that's why we were yelling kayfabe in the first place.

— Pat Patterson, describing his interaction with a ring attendant in the Pacific Northwest Wrestling territory during the early 1960s.

The term kayfabe was often used as a warning to other wrestlers that someone who was not "in the know" was in the vicinity. This could include wrestlers' family members who had not been clued in to the scripted nature of professional wrestling. An example of kayfabe being kept even from family members was illustrated in an article describing how in the 1970s, the wife of James Harris (known under the ring name Kamala) was celebrating that her husband had just won a $5,000 prize (equivalent to $30,000 in 2025) as he won a battle royal, not realizing that the prize money was simply a storyline or kayfabe.

The term kayfabe itself can be used in a variety of contexts, as an adjective, for instance, when referring to a "kayfabe interview", where the person being interviewed remains "in character", or when describing someone as a "kayfabe girlfriend", implying that she is playing a role, but is not actually romantically involved with that particular person. A person can also be said to be "kayfabing" someone, by presenting storylines and rivalries as real.

== Etymology ==
Although its origin remains uncertain, the earliest known written evidence of the word "kayfabe" comes from the Wrestling Observer Newsletter Yearbook for 1988, as the Oxford English Dictionary notes. Merriam-Webster suggests kayfabe might be carny-speak for "be fake", a theory supported by sports figure Chael Sonnen, or altered Pig Latin for the same. Other possible origins are the French challenge phrase qui vive, "long live who?", which came to mean "alert; lookout" in English, as in the phrase "on the qui vive", or the Latin cavēre, "beware; avoid", source of the synonymous British idiom "keep cave." The same phrase, as "keep cavey", was used by Jews in East London during the interwar period and could have been corrupted by U.S. promoters and wrestlers.

== History ==
Professional wrestling has been staged from the time it was a sideshow attraction; the scripted nature of the performances has been hinted at over time. In 1934, a show held at Wrigley Field in Chicago billed one of the matches as "the last great shooting match", subtly disclosing that the other matches were kayfabe (in reality, even the "shooting" match was scripted). The amendments to the Communications Act of 1934, passed following the quiz show scandals in 1960, prohibited the televising of scripted contests but specifically only prohibited the rigging of games of chance or intellectual skill or knowledge, and thus rigged athletic competitions were still arguably legal to televise.

Although the scripted nature of professional wrestling was an open secret, it was not generally acknowledged by people in the business. Often wrestlers and promoters would make sure that on-screen rivals were not seen eating or traveling together between shows and so on. There were a few occasional mistakes at the time, such as an incident in 1987 in which police arrested The Iron Sheik and Hacksaw Jim Duggan, supposed rivals in an upcoming match at Madison Square Garden, together in a car drinking and carrying cocaine.

The first public acknowledgment by a major insider of the staged nature of professional wrestling came in 1989 when World Wrestling Federation owner Vince McMahon testified before the New Jersey State Senate that wrestling was not a competitive sport. The admission on McMahon's part was to avoid interference from state athletic commissions and to avoid paying the taxation some states placed on income from athletic events held in that state, as well as to avoid the need to meet the requirement of having to employ medical professionals standing by, as was generally mandatory for legitimate contact sports involving substantial possibility of injury. The era of professional wrestling since then has been described by Josephine Riesman as "neokayfabe", in which storylines can become real life and vice versa, thus blurring the distinction between fact and fiction and giving the audience complicity in creating the spectacle.

== Faces and heels ==
Wrestler characters fall into two broad categories: faces and heels. Faces, short for "babyfaces", are hero-type characters whose personalities are crafted to elicit the support of the audience through traits such as humility, patriotism, a hard-working nature, determination, and reciprocal love of the crowd. Faces usually win their matches on the basis of their technical skills and are sometimes portrayed as underdogs to enhance the story.

Heels are villainous or antagonistic characters, whose personalities are crafted to elicit a negative response from the audience. They often embrace traditionally negative traits such as narcissism, egomania, unprompted rage, sadism, and general bitterness. Although not as prevalent today, xenophobic ethnic and racial stereotypes, especially those inspired by the Axis powers of World War II and Communist countries during the Cold War era, were commonly used in North American wrestling as heel-defining traits. Another angle of a heel could be approached from a position of authority, such as: Big Boss Man, a corrections officer; Mike Rotunda as Irwin R. Schyster, a federal tax collector; Jacques Rougeau wearing RCMP-inspired dress as The Mountie; and Glenn Jacobs (who would later become famous as Kane) as Isaac Yankem, a dentist. Heels can also be other characters held in low esteem by the public, such as a repossession agent (a role played by Barry Darsow as Repo Man). Heels typically inspire boos from the audience and often employ underhanded tactics, such as cheating and exploiting technicalities in their fighting strategies, or using overly aggressive styles to cause (the perception of) excess pain or injury to their opponents.

A wrestler can change from face to heel (or vice versa) in an event known as a turn, or gradually transition from one to the other over the course of a long storyline. Wrestlers like André the Giant, Roddy Piper, Hulk Hogan, and "Macho Man" Randy Savage have worked across the entire spectrum and have often gained new fans as a result of each "turn".

Matches are usually organized between a heel and a face, but the distinction between the two types can be blurred as a given character's storyline reaches a peak or becomes more complicated. In recent years, several wrestlers became characters that were neither faces nor heels, but somewhere in between (or alternating between both), earning them the designation "tweener", reflecting the rise in popular culture of the concept of the antihero; such characters often display the underhand tactics and aggression of a traditional heel, but do so in ways sympathetic to the audience, or within the confines of some internal code, such as only fighting obvious heel characters, criticizing authority figures. Particularly successful tweeners can find over time that they are enthusiastically adopted as "faces" by the audience without changing their tweener or antihero characterization (e.g., Stone Cold Steve Austin and Shawn Michaels).

Sometimes, despite a wrestler's character alignment, the crowd may not react accordingly. This can be due to booking issues or a particular crowd's tendency to react positively to heels, and negatively (or at least in an indifferent manner) to faces. A strong audience reaction against the original push of a character can occasionally lead to booking a "turn" where the character begins to act in line with the audience's reaction; this can help reset a character with an audience, as occurred when the audience widely rejected a traditional "face" character, Rocky Maivia, who transitioned the character with huge success to a "heel" as The Rock. The divide can also be separated by fan demographics: where older male fans may tend to cheer for heels and boo the faces, kids and female fans may cheer for faces and boo the heels, as it happened with wrestlers like John Cena and Roman Reigns.

== Outside professional wrestling ==
Kayfabe, while not referred to as such, has existed in other areas of show business and politics, especially in feuds. For instance, the feuds between comedians Jack Benny and Fred Allen, and comedian/actor Bob Hope and singer/actor Bing Crosby were totally fake; in real life, Benny and Allen were best friends while Hope and Crosby were also close friends. A more recent example is the satirical feud between talk show host Jimmy Kimmel and actor Matt Damon, which has been a running joke on Jimmy Kimmel Live! for many years and was even referenced when Kimmel hosted the 89th Academy Awards. Other examples of kayfabe rivalries include that between Dwayne Johnson and Kevin Hart, and that of Hugh Jackman and Ryan Reynolds.

It has long been claimed that kayfabe has been used in American politics, especially in election campaigns, Congress, and the White House. In interviews as Governor of Minnesota, former wrestler Jesse Ventura often likened Washington to wrestling when he said that politicians "pretend to hate each other in public, then go out to dinner together". In 2023, Abraham Josephine Riesman's book Ringmaster: Vince McMahon and the Unmaking of America argued that strategies of the Republican Party closest to Donald Trump can be explained by kayfabe.

An example of kayfabe being broken outside of professional wrestling was in 2004, during the I Love Bees alternative reality game used to promote Halo 2, when one of the calltakers who voiced the AI that had hacked the website in the game's storyline broke character to tell a caller to run to safety since he was in the middle of Hurricane Ivan. Kayfabe concepts have also been incorporated into competition TV series in which contestants interact with paid actors who remain in character throughout. In the case of the late-2000s The Joe Schmo Show, the basic premise was the contestants were unaware they were surrounded by actors (with the actors intentionally breaking kayfabe at the conclusion and, sometimes, unintentionally during production.). A mystery-themed competition series from 2001, Murder in Small Town X saw contestants roaming around a real-life town in Maine as part of an ongoing storyline, interacting with actors who maintained kayfabe throughout.

Writing for Wired, Cecilia D'Anastasio describes VTubing as "digital kayfabe". Brennan Williams, who wrestled under WWE as Mace at the time of the interview, and who also streams as the VTuber JiBo, opined that wrestling personas and VTuber avatars are "literally the same thing". The fictional conglomerate Vought International from the Amazon Prime TV series The Boys appears on several social media platforms, posting in-universe content as newscasters from the show. Like the show, the accounts parody current political and cultural events, such as U.S. President Donald Trump's McDonald's visit in Pennsylvania, the Spotify viral marketing campaign Spotify Wrapped and the Super Bowl. Many comments on Vought International posts are from fans of the show participating in kayfabe, posting about the main characters as if they themselves are civilians in the show.

== See also ==
- Glossary of professional wrestling terms
- Professionalism
- Autistic masking
- Etiquette
- Public relations
- Work-life balance
- Trade secret
- Truthiness
- Simulacra and Simulation
- Roleplay
- Method acting § Misconceptions
- Sherlockian game
