= Schwarzenegger–Stallone rivalry =

Rivalry between two popular American actors

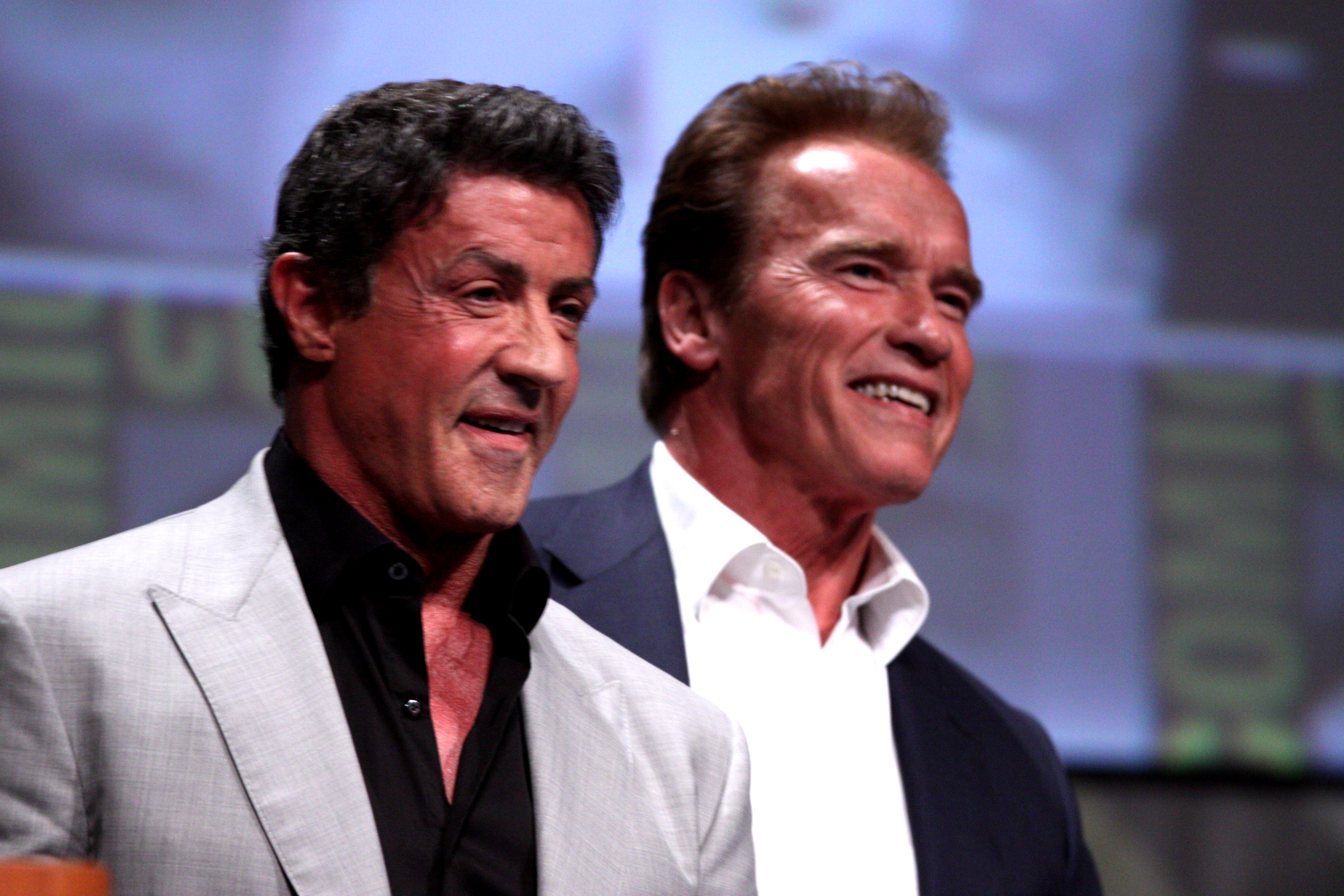
Stallone (left) and Schwarzenegger (right) speaking at the 2012 San Diego Comic-Con

The rivalry between Austrian-American actor Arnold Schwarzenegger and American actor Sylvester Stallone went on for about 10 years after the release of Commando and Rambo: First Blood Part II in 1985 until the 1996 filming of Daylight and Eraser, often involving incidents of one-upsmanship and subterfuge from both parties.

== History ==
The two actors first met each other in 1977 when assigned to the same table at the 34th Golden Globe Awards, where Rocky, written by and starring Stallone, had been nominated for six categories but came up short in all but one of them, while Schwarzenegger was nominated for New Star of the Year, for Stay Hungry, which he won. Stallone later spoke out in an interview with Variety, saying that Schwarzenegger laughed at him when Rocky lost in several categories. Finally, when Rocky won Best Motion Picture – Drama, Stallone threw a bowl of flowers at Schwarzenegger.

== Popularity ==
The rival actors attacked each other in the press, and they often tried to surpass the other with more on-screen killings and larger weapons. In an October 1985 interview with The News of the World, Schwarzenegger apparently insulted Stallone (who was considered a much bigger star at the time) by alleging that Stallone uses body doubles in a few of his films, and that one "would be angry at hearing their name in the same breath" as the Rocky actor.

In November 1985, Rocky IV, starring Stallone, opened with a $20 million weekend. The villainous character of Ivan Drago has several elements that recall Schwarzenegger: his use of technology (à la the Terminator), foreign accent, size and stature.

In February 1988, The News of the World ran a story by the journalist Wendy Leigh with the headline: "Hollywood Star's Nazi Secret." The article claimed Schwarzenegger was a secret admirer of Adolf Hitler and held "fervent Nazi and anti-Semitic views." It also alleged that Schwarzenegger's father Gustav participated in the forcible round-up of Jews as part of the Holocaust. Leigh's source was claimed to be Stallone. While Schwarzenegger's father did indeed voluntarily apply to join the Austrian National Socialist Party on 1 March 1938 and fought for Nazi Germany during World War II, there is no evidence to support Gustav rounding up Jews or directly participating in war crimes. Gustav's Nazi links were revealed in 1990, two years after the accusation; however, Arnold, who was born two years after the end of World War II, has always fervently denounced them. Leigh later claimed her source for the story, Stallone, also paid for her legal fees when Schwarzenegger sued for libel; the newspaper apologized late in 1989 and agreed to pay damages.

In September 1988, the New York Post reported that Stallone and his entourage entered a nightclub, saw a picture of Schwarzenegger on the wall, and demanded its removal, or else Stallone would leave. The owner handed the picture of Schwarzenegger over to Stallone's minders, who then destroyed it.

In March 1990, Stallone read an unauthorized biography by Leigh about Schwarzenegger's Nazi family, difficult childhood, and use of steroids in his teens. Stallone, according to Leigh, was so pleased after reading the first draft that he remarked "Reading this is better than getting four blow jobs". Schwarzenegger has subsequently admitted to taking steroids while bodybuilding, and he also mentioned his father was indeed an abusive alcoholic.

=== Mentions in film ===
In Twins (1988), Schwarzenegger's character takes notice of a Rambo III poster, mockingly implying with a hand gesture that he has bigger muscles than John Rambo. In Stallone's Tango & Cash (1989), his character mockingly tells a criminal "l loved you in Conan the Barbarian!" before beating him up. Last Action Hero (1993) features scenes in the world of a movie starring Schwarzenegger; as Schwarzenegger is not an actor in this reality, an advertisement for Terminator 2 instead depicts Stallone starring as the title character, while Schwarzenegger's character offers tongue-in-cheek praise of Stallone's performance. In Demolition Man (1993), Stallone's John Spartan wakes up in the future year of 2032 to find that Arnold Schwarzenegger had gone on to serve as President of the United States (due to a constitutional amendment that allowed citizens born outside the United States to run for office).

In an interview with Jimmy Fallon on The Tonight Show, Stallone stated that Schwarzenegger once tricked him into doing the critically reviled 1992 film Stop! Or My Mom Will Shoot. Schwarzenegger later admitted to this in an interview with Jimmy Kimmel on Jimmy Kimmel Live!, saying:

I read the script, and it was a piece of shit. I say to myself, "I'm not going to do this movie." Then they went to Sly, and Sly called me and [asked], "have they ever talked to you about this movie?" And I said, "Yes, I was thinking about doing it—this is a really brilliant idea, this movie." When he heard that, because [we were] in competition, he immediately called them and said, "Whatever it takes, I'll do the movie." And, of course, the movie went major into the toilet.

== Conclusion and legacy ==
The rivalry ended in the late 1990s when both actors' impact on the box office had reduced significantly. At the turn of the millennium, The Hollywood Reporter said that the pair were considering a joint acting venture. Schwarzenegger also invited Stallone for multiple inaugurations during his time as the Governor of California; as a gesture of goodwill, Stallone had donated $15,000 to Schwarzenegger's re-election campaign in 2005. The pair also appeared in four movies together: The Expendables (with Schwarzenegger making an uncredited cameo appearance), The Expendables 2, The Expendables 3, and Escape Plan.

In the 2023 Netflix documentary series Arnold, which chronicles the life and career of Schwarzenegger, Stallone reflects on their long-running rivalry, acknowledging that Schwarzenegger ultimately surpassed him in box-office success and cultural prominence, stating:

"He wanted to be number one. Unfortunately, he got there."

== See also ==
- Vulgar auteurism – several of their films are in this article
- Blockbuster cinema
- Indiewood – several of their films are also in this article
- Ben Affleck and Matt Damon
