= L Street Tavern =

Bar in South Boston, Massachusetts, U.S.

- Interactive map of L Street Tavern

Restaurant information
- Established: 1962 (64 years ago)
- Owners: Jack Woods; Susan Woods
- Location: 658 East 8th Street, South Boston, Suffolk County, Massachusetts, 02127, United States
- Coordinates: 42.331656°N 71.035438°W

L Street Tavern (currently known as Woody's L Street Tavern) is a bar located at 658 East 8th Street, at its intersection with L Street, in South Boston, Massachusetts, United States. Established in 1962, it came to prominence as the dive bar frequented by Matt Damon and Ben Affleck's characters, Will and Chuckie, in the 1997 film Good Will Hunting.

== History ==
Jack (Woody) and Susan Woods purchased the bar in March 1997, and began planning its renovations. Four days later, "Robin Williams walked in the door with two cute kids who said they'd written a screenplay," said Susan.
