= Jimmy Flynn =

American actor (1934–2022)

- Born: February 5, 1934; Somerville, Massachusetts, U.S.
- Died: September 12, 2022 (aged 88)
- Occupations: Actor, teamster
- Years active: ?–2022

James P. Flynn (February 5, 1934 – September 12, 2022) was an American teamster and film actor. He was a reputed member of the famous Winter Hill Gang. He appeared in films including Good Will Hunting, The Cider House Rules and What's the Worst That Could Happen?.

== Biography ==
James P. Flynn was born in Somerville, Massachusetts.

In 1982, Flynn was wrongly identified as a shooter in the murder of Winter Hill Gang mob associate Brian "Balloonhead" Halloran and attempted murder of Michael Donahue. He was tried and acquitted for the murder in 1986 after being framed by John Connolly and James J. Bulger.

Flynn was a part of Boston's International Brotherhood of Teamsters Local 25 labor union where he later ran the organization's movie production crew. He has also been the Teamster Union's transportation coordinator and transportation captain in the transportation department on numerous films, including The Departed, Fever Pitch and Jumanji.

Flynn appeared in many films shot in the New England area. In show business he went by the name 'James P. Flynn'. Flynn was cast as a judge in the Boston-based film Good Will Hunting in 1997. Later, he acted in the 1999 film The Cider House Rules and What's the Worst That Could Happen? in 2001. He was also a truck driver for movie production equipment during the filming of My Best Friend's Girl in 2008. Boston actor Tom Kemp remarked: "The film The Departed wouldn't be a Boston movie without me, a Wahlberg, and Jimmy Flynn from the teamsters."

== Filmography ==
- Good Will Hunting (1997) as Judge George H. Malone
- The Cider House Rules (1999) as Vernon
- What's the Worst That Could Happen? (2001) as the Fire Captain
