= Gifted Child Today =

- Discipline: Gifted education
- Language: English
- Edited by: Susan Johnsen

Publication details
- History: 1978-present
- Publisher: SAGE Publications
- Frequency: Quarterly
- Impact factor: (2010)

Standard abbreviations
- ISO 4: Gift. Child Today

Indexing
- ISSN: 1076-2175
- LCCN: 86658061
- OCLC no.: 181819450

Links
- Journal homepage; Online access; Online archive

Gifted Child Today is a quarterly peer-reviewed academic journal that covers research on teaching and parenting gifted and talented children. The editor-in-chief is Susan Johnsen (Baylor University). It was established in 1978 and is currently published by SAGE Publications.

== Abstracting and indexing ==
Gifted Child Today is abstracted and indexed in:

- Academic OneFile
- Education Abstracts
- Education Research Complete
- ERIC - Education Resources Information Center
- Professional Development Collection
- ProQuest
- TOC Premier
- Zetoc
