= Damon–Kimmel feud =

Long-running humorous feud

Matt Damon-Jimmy Kimmel feud
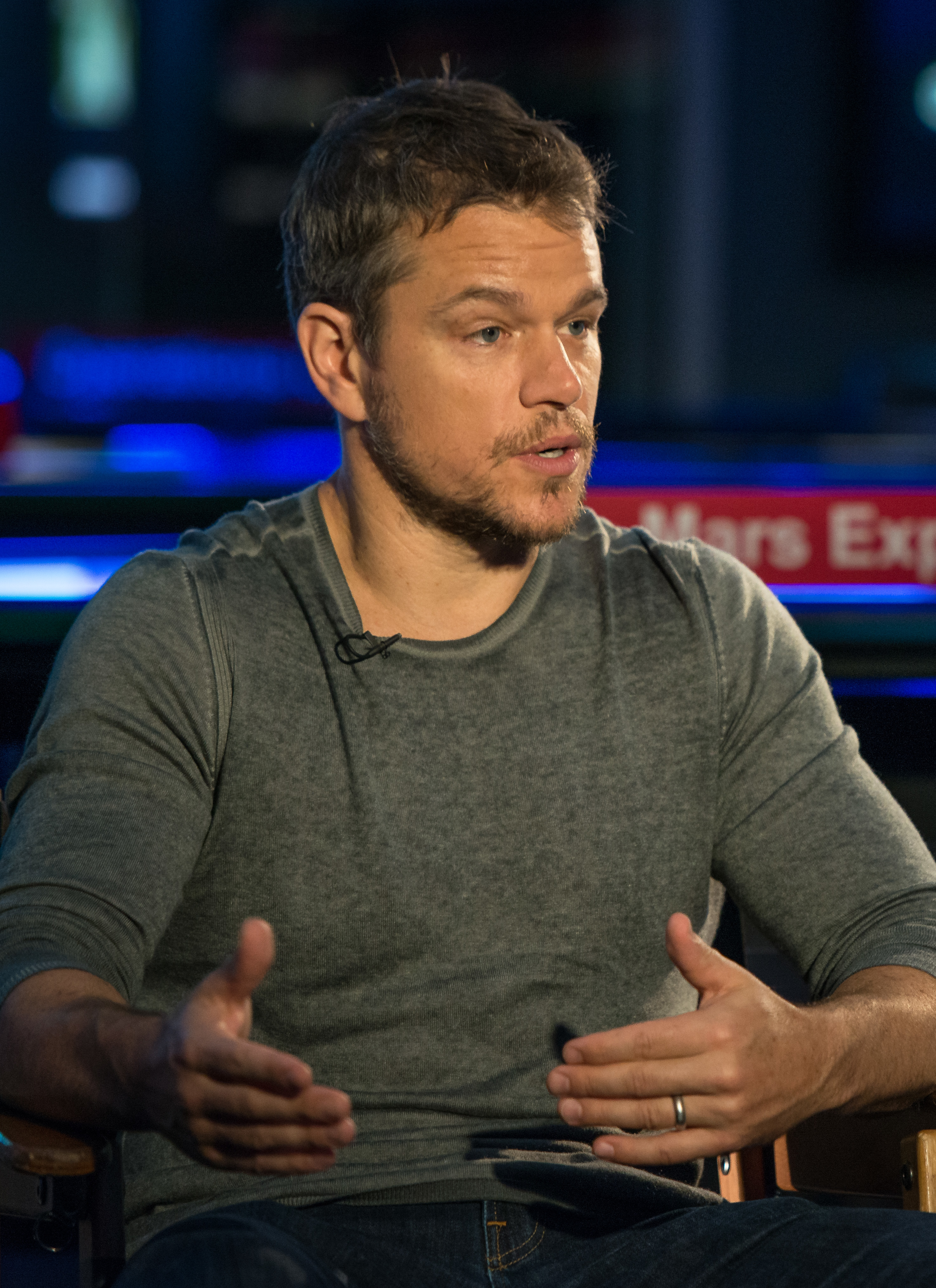
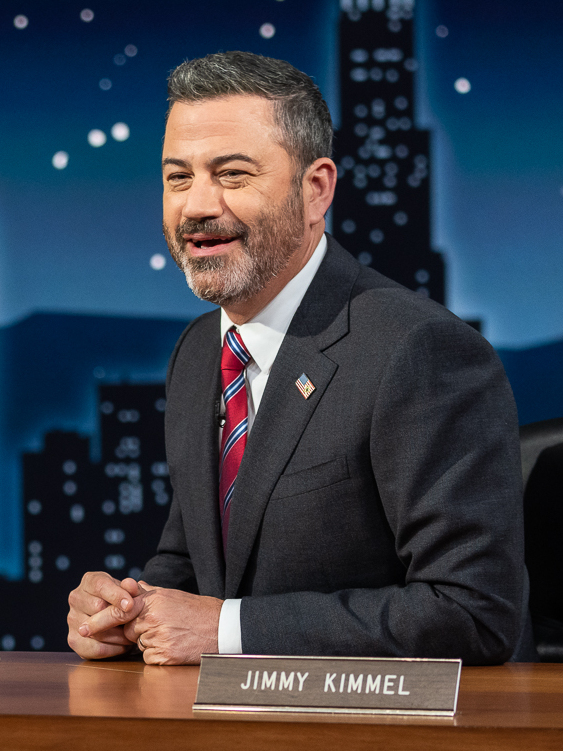
- Matt Damon in 2014 Jimmy Kimmel in 2022
- Date: December 14, 2005 – present
- Medium: Pranks; Running gags Promotional appearances Sketches
- Status: Ongoing

Since 2005, American actor Matt Damon and television host Jimmy Kimmel have been involved in a satirical public feud that has garnered nationwide coverage due to the pranks and gags associated with it, of which the majority take place on Kimmel's show, Jimmy Kimmel Live!

The exchanges began when Kimmel ended an episode of his show by saying, jokingly, "Apologies to Matt Damon, but we ran out of time," despite Damon not being scheduled to be on the show. Kimmel went on to repeat the fake apology, as a running gag, at the end of every episode. Damon appeared on the show for the first time in 2006, but was unceremoniously bumped off, leading him to have a scripted outburst. The "feud" escalated from there, with Damon and Kimmel constantly trading insults onscreen and off, with each succeeding attempt becoming more elaborate with filmed sketches and onscreen pranks. Over the next two decades, Damon would feign increasingly desperate measures to appear as a guest on the show, while Kimmel would go to elaborate lengths to prevent them.

The two have often enlisted the help of other celebrities to prank each other publicly, with Damon's longtime friend and collaborator Ben Affleck acting as a mediator in several instances. Instances of the feud would often coincide with Damon's promotional appearances for a project in lieu of a typical interview. Despite becoming friends in private, Damon and Kimmel have continued the "feud" and their personas in public appearances, even on occasions where the other was not present.

== Timeline ==
In 2005, Kimmel, who at this point had never met Damon, ended his December 14 show by saying "Apologies to Matt Damon, but we ran out of time". Kimmel later explained "We had a bad show...and I was feeling pretty bad about myself at the end of the program. And I decided to say, for the amusement of one of our producers who was standing next to me...Matt Damon was just the first name that popped into my head. I was trying to think of an A-list star, and somebody we absolutely would not bump if he was on the show." Seeing the amusement of his producers, Kimmel continued the trend of ending his show with the same comment.

Damon had his own perspective of the feud's origins in an interview, saying: "People started to call me and ask like, 'Hey, what's your connection to this guy?' And I'd never met Jimmy, he literally pulled my name out of thin air one night." Recalling his name had been used "kind of as a throwaway", he added, "He could've said, you know, George [Clooney] ― he could have said somebody else. But he just, for some reason, maybe I had a movie out that week or something, but he just said my name, and it changed the course of both of our lives. We've kept this feud going for, you know, it's gotta be 15 years now. I've had a lot of fun doing it."

In 2006, the two played further into the gag when Damon made his first guest appearance on Kimmel by way of Kimmel introducing Damon just to quickly cut him off and end the show. As a result, Damon began swearing at the host and stormed off the stage, with many fans believing the interaction to be genuine.

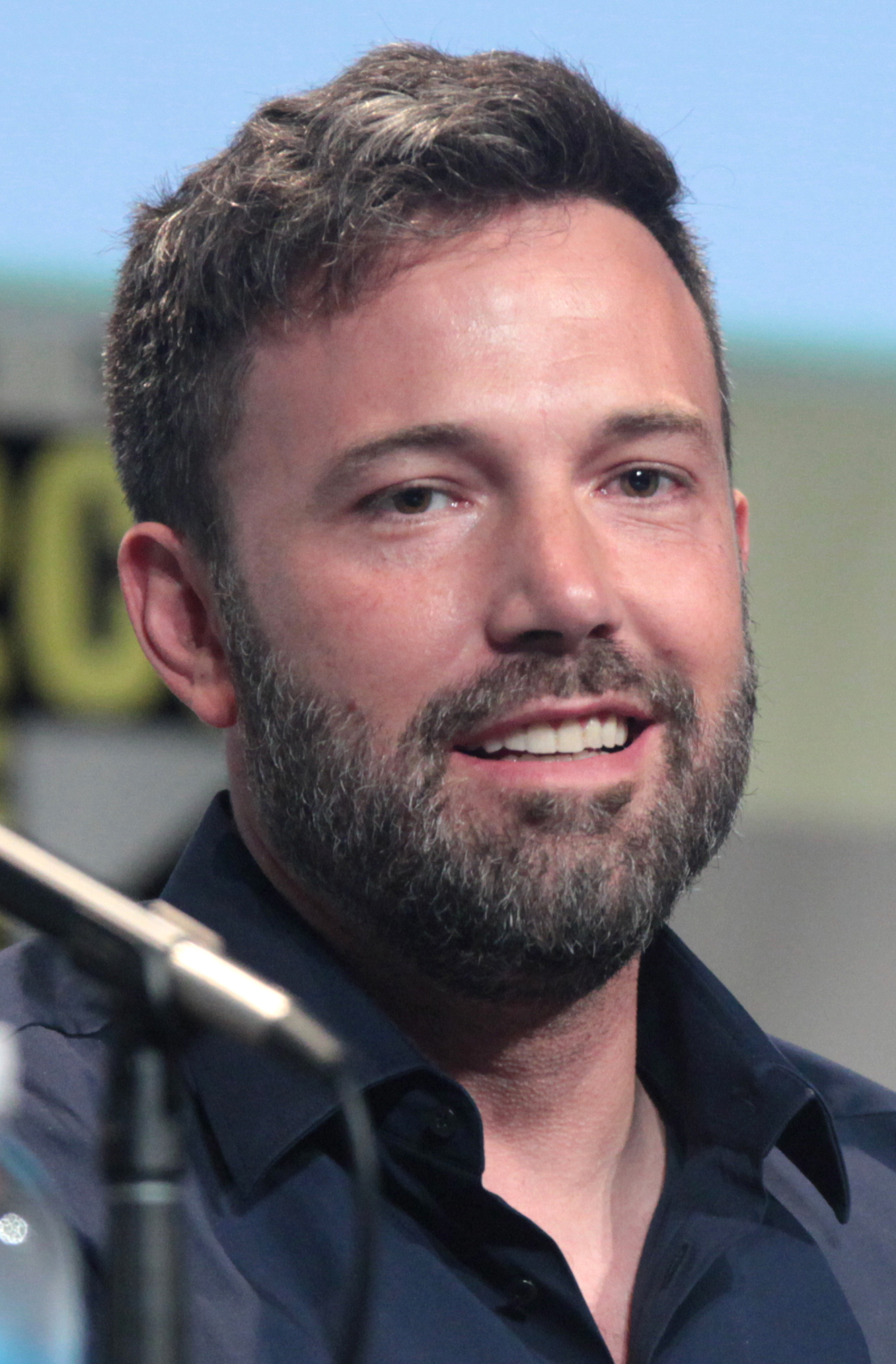
Damon's friend and longtime collaborator Ben Affleck has been involved with several instances and filmed segments of the feud, either acting as a mediator or as a defender of Kimmel.

In 2007, after Damon was asked to return to the show, he instead asked comedian (and Kimmel's then-girlfriend) Sarah Silverman to take his place and had Kimmel play a music video starring her and Damon in which the two joke about being in a sexual relationship, effectively "exposing" Silverman as cheating on Kimmel with Damon. The segment, titled "I'm Fucking Matt Damon", won a Creative Arts Emmy Award for Outstanding Original Music and Lyrics. In a humorous response, Kimmel made a video with Damon's childhood friend and long-time collaborator Ben Affleck titled "I'm Fucking Ben Affleck", an idea proposed by Affleck's then-wife Jennifer Garner. Kimmel topped Silverman with video appearances by Don Cheadle, Robin Williams, Christopher Mintz-Plasse, Lance Bass, Good Charlotte, Harrison Ford, Cameron Diaz and more in a "We Are the World" type chorus, along with Brad Pitt as a FedEx man, Josh Groban on piano and many more.

The feud was further developed in 2013 when, to the surprise of many, Damon was the host of an episode of Kimmel titled "Jimmy Kimmel Sucks," where Damon, driven to insanity for being bumped off every night, hijacked hosting duties of the show after "kidnapping" Kimmel. Kimmel himself is wheeled out onto set by Damon and left in the background for the entire episode duct taped to his chair with his tie acting as a gag, while sidekick Guillermo is replaced by Andy Garcia and band leader Cleto Escobedo III is replaced by Sheryl Crow. Robin Williams delivered the episode's monologue. Several celebrities congratulated Damon in a filmed segment, while ironically only Ben Affleck appeared on the episode to defend Kimmel. Damon's guests for episode were Nicole Kidman, Gary Oldman, Amy Adams, and Sarah Silverman, while Garcia interviewed Reese Witherspoon and Demi Moore outside the set. At the end, Damon thanked everyone and asked Kimmel if he had anything to say before saying "Wait, I'm sorry, we're out of time." and signing off, bumping Kimmel off to avenge the times Kimmel had bumped him off.

In February 2014, the cast of The Monuments Men appeared on the show. The jokes started with put-downs in the monologue and followed with a lack of seating for Damon. Eventually, a small chair was brought out and Damon's cast mates were coaxed into adding jibes. Kimmel finally appeared to ask Damon a serious question, when an intentional fire alarm sounded, ending the interview.

Damon reappeared on Kimmel in 2015, where he and Kimmel ran a sketch in which they attended couples' counseling in a satirical attempt to "resolve their issues". This episode did not end with Kimmel's routine apology to Damon.

In 2016, Damon made his first successful attempt at "sneaking" onto the set of Kimmel when Kimmel sat down to interview Ben Affleck. Affleck takes the stage wearing a long and bulky coat, and when Kimmel insists that Affleck takes the jacket off, Damon is revealed to have been inside. Later on during the show, Affleck presented a faux deleted scene of Batman v Superman: Dawn of Justice where Kimmel is depicted being launched from Earth to Mars by Superman, subsequently encountering Dr. Mark Watney, Damon's character from The Martian (2015). Kimmel denies Watney's suggestion of starting an improvised talk show together, and playfully insults Damon for not winning the Academy Award for Best Actor. When Kimmel hosted the 68th Primetime Emmy Awards that year, Damon appeared onstage to mock Kimmel for not winning the Primetime Emmy Award for Outstanding Talk Series.

On a 2016 episode of The Tonight Show Starring Jimmy Fallon, after host Jimmy Fallon brought up the feud, Damon joked about how Fallon's invitation to the show had been quick and successful, praising Fallon, saying, "That's how you host a talk show!" The following day on his program, Kimmel said he was offended by Damon's remarks, and as a result Damon would not be on the show that night yet again; Damon, holed up in the dressing room, reacted angrily, with the sound muted to the audience.

On a Kimmel episode following Super Bowl LI in 2017, Damon once again "snuck" onto the show's set, this time posing as New England Patriots player Tom Brady. Despite trying to stay in character, Damon's identity was confirmed when Kimmel took off his football helmet. That same month, Kimmel during his monologue shared that he was with his then-pregnant wife and head writer Molly McNearney at their baby's 28-week ultrasound when they were given a surprise. A filmed sketch was shown with Damon abruptly interrupting their ultrasound to share that he was the baby's father, leading Kimmel to be enraged and McNearney admitting her infidelity. The two then take a paternity test as encouraged by McNearney's doctor. The three are later shown to appear in a parody of Maury, with Martin Short portraying Maury Povich in a segment called "The Unborn Identity." After exaggerated verbal sparring between the two, Povich revealed that neither Kimmel nor Damon were the father, but instead the father was Tracy Morgan, with McNearney claiming, "How could either of you satisfy me when all you really want is each other?" Morgan claimed he was pregnant as well with Povich's baby. Returning to the program, Kimmel discouraged the audience from watching Damon's then-upcoming film, The Great Wall (2016).

During a 2017 interview with Good Morning America, Kimmel, who was set to host that year's Academy Awards, stated that he hoped Damon would not receive the award for Best Picture, for which the film Manchester By The Sea, produced by Damon, had been nominated. At the ceremony, Affleck and Damon presented the award for Best Original Screenplay, though Kimmel introduced Damon as Affleck's guest and attempted to play the presenters off stage by conducting the orchestra.

Later that year, Damon made an unscheduled appearance on Kimmel while Kimmel was interviewing Chris Hemsworth, Mark Ruffalo, and Taika Waititi, who were promoting Thor: Ragnarok (2017), which Damon had a cameo appearance in. Kimmel tried to interview Ruffalo and Waititi backstage, but Damon attempted to nudge his way on camera much to the annoyance of Kimmel. Later, while interviewing Hemsworth, Damon "hacked" Kimmel's display and interrupted the interview, claiming that he had finally made it on the show. After a circulation of memes implying that Damon was "replacing" Affleck with Hemsworth, Affleck called onto the long-running feud by tweeting: "Hey [Hemsworth], you can have [Damon]! I'm team [Kimmel] anyways."

In a 2019 episode of Kimmel, Kimmel enlisted the help of the real Tom Brady to throw a football through a window of Damon's home. Damon stormed out and questioned Kimmel, who feigned ignorance to the fact that the home belonged to Damon. The same year, after Kimmel's comedy club opened in Las Vegas, the host made reference to the long-running feud in an interview, saying "I'd love to see [Damon] do standup. I think it would be a nightmare for him and everyone involved, but he's not going to be doing it at my club because we have a restraining order against him. Las Vegas Metro Police are on alert to make sure he never gets in here."

In June 2020, during the COVID-19 pandemic, Kimmel announced from his home his intention to take the summer off to spend time with his family and assign guest hosts, however Damon appeared behind him only wearing a bathrobe and a mask to express his surprise. Damon claimed he, unbeknownst to Kimmel, was holed up inside one of Kimmel's bedrooms instead of the studio's holding room for months due to the pandemic while waiting to finally appear on the show. Kimmel's wife McNearney could then be seen trying to sneak out of Damon's bedroom, with Damon sharing that he has been sleeping with McNearney again to Kimmel's anger.

When Kimmel and Jimmy Fallon switched their respective shows (Jimmy Kimmel Live! and The Tonight Show Starring Jimmy Fallon), for April Fools’ Day 2022, Justin Timberlake (a regular guest on the latter), portrayed Damon.

In 2023, Kimmel, once again set to host that year's Oscars, stated "I'm thrilled that [Damon] won't show. I hope he never gets nominated again." Then, in reference to the Best Picture announcement error at the 2017 Oscars, Kimmel said "I believe [Damon's] presence somehow caused the envelope mix up."

On the red carpet at the premiere of the 2023 film Air, in which Damon starred, Damon was asked if he would ever make amends with Kimmel, to which he responded "No, no. He's an asshole. Why would I ever do that? He's a terrible human being. He's a demonstrably bad man." That same evening, when Kimmel appeared on the carpet, Damon yelled to him: "Hey! I'd love to take a picture with you, but we ran out of time!", in reference to Kimmel's famous apology to Damon. Kimmel responded by saying to Entertainment Weekly, "You know, I don't know who that was, but yeah, I heard him. He was loud." While promoting Air, Affleck, the film's director, made an appearance on Kimmel in which he attempted to unite the two celebrities by making a FaceTime call to Damon. Kimmel agreed to ask Damon a question about his role in Air, but when Damon began to respond, the host faked technical difficulties with the call and repeatedly froze the screen on unflattering views of Damon's face.

In a promo for the 96th Academy Awards broadcast in 2024, which Kimmel would host, he reacts to the appearance of Damon's character from Oppenheimer by calling Damon a "poor, incredibly hideous, disgusting, ugly man". Near the end of that year's broadcast, just before rolling the final credits, Messi the dog, who appeared in the Oscar-nominated film Anatomy of a Fall, was shown appearing to urinate on Damon's star on the Hollywood Walk of Fame. In a 2024 episode of Kimmel, Guillermo mistakes Jesse Plemons for Damon and jokingly puts him in a cage.

In July 2025, Kimmel hosted Who Wants to Be a Millionaire with pairs of celebrities playing for charity. Jeopardy! host Ken Jennings appeared on his own initially, before revealing that his celebrity partner would be Damon. Kimmel acted as though Damon had snuck onto the show, and the two traded insults for the duration of the game, with Kimmel additionally being "angry" at Jennings for bringing Damon on. Damon and Jennings eventually won the grand prize of $1,000,000 for Damon's charity, Water.org, during their run. In addition, when the "time's up" sound went off after they answered the $250,000 question, Kimmel said "We're out of time for Matt Damon." before Damon reminded him the rules of the show require the two to be allowed to finish out their game at the start of the following episode.

In October 2025, when Kimmel was hosting the show in Brooklyn, he brought out a neon-green bespectacled mascot named Frankie Focus, whom New York Governor Kathy Hochul had recently appeared with as part of a campaign against mobile phone use in school. The mascot was developed by New York based Furry Puppet Studio. When the mascot began to make insulting jokes about Kimmel, the host pulled the head off the mascot to reveal Damon.

In January 2026, Damon, Affleck, and Teyana Taylor were in a promotional YouTube video for their Netflix film The Rip, where the three ripped objects through an ASMR microphone. One such image was a picture of Kimmel, which Damon gleefully ripped onscreen. In June 2026, Kimmel was suspiciously gifted by UPS a gigantic Trojan horse and a "baby" Trojan horse, with the latter wheeled inside the set. Damon emerged from the horse, as part of a ploy to promote his newest film The Odyssey (2026). The two traded insults with one another, ultimately leading to an amateur fight with pool noodles before Damon cut the program to commercial. In September 2026, during the annual “Kimmel in Brooklyn” week, Damon crashed Kimmel’s monologue chanting support for the Boston Red Sox and brought Kimmel’s mother and sister before being escorted out. In November 2026, Damon was awarded as one of GQ's Men of the Year 2026. During the party celebrating Damon and the other awardees, Kimmel made a toast for Damon, which instead turned into a "roast" with Kimmel making passive-aggressive insults towards him. Following Kimmel's toast, Damon reiterated during his closing remarks that he did not invite Kimmel while thanking the guests in attendance.

== Publicity ==
Since the feud began in 2005, many celebrity news outlets have covered the satirical animosity between the two. This has resulted in many articles explaining the feud and some fans wondering whether the rivalry is legitimate. Despite this, the pair have, on certain occasions, dropped the act and revealed themselves as friends, leading many to dub the two as "frenemies". In 2013, Damon attended Kimmel's wedding to Molly McNearney. 2013 also marked Damon and his wife Luciana's 10 year anniversary of their first meeting. They held a vow renewal ceremony to celebrate the occasion which Kimmel officiated. The two attended Game 5 of the 2018 World Series together with Affleck.

In 2023, in light of the WGA strike, Kimmel revealed that Damon and Affleck offered to pay his staff, though Kimmel turned them down as he felt it was "not their responsibility".

== See also ==
- Ben Affleck and Matt Damon - long-lasting friendship of Damon's who have regularly appeared in feud segments
