= John Brenkman =

American historian

John Brenkman is an American historian of American literature, currently a Distinguished Professor and Department Chair at Baruch College of the City University of New York, and also a published author. He is also a founding editor of the Duke University journal Social Text.
