= Brenda Withers =

American playwright and actress

- Education: Dartmouth College
- Occupations: Playwright, stage actress
- Writing career
- Genre: Comedy
- Notable works: Matt & Ben

Brenda Withers is an American playwright and actor. Withers grew up on Long Island, New York, and graduated from Dartmouth College. She is a founder of the Harbor Stage Company, a professional non-profit theater in Wellfleet, MA.

She has acted in stage productions of Crimes of the Heart, The Philadelphia Story, and Abundance. In 2011, her play The Ding Dongs or What is the Penalty in Portugal? premiered at the Wellfleet Harbor Actors Theatre, where she was a company member and playwright at the time. Her other plays include Off Peak, The Kritik, Northside Hollow (co-written with Jonathan Fielding), and Cyrano (co-adapted with Jason O'Connell). Her work has been produced at places like the Old Globe, 59e.59, Portland Stage, Urbanite Theatre, the Hudson Valley Shakespeare Festival, and Amphibian Stage.

In 2001, Withers and her college roommate Mindy Kaling co-wrote Matt & Ben, a play in which they starred as Matt Damon and Ben Affleck, respectively. The play debuted in 2002 at that year's New York International Fringe Festival, where it became a surprise hit and won the "Best in Fringe" award. It began an Off Broadway run in 2003, which led to it receiving multiple favorable reviews, including from the New Yorker. In one of the show's Off Broadway productions, in a scene in which Kaling was supposed to fake a choreographed punch to Withers's face, Kaling accidentally punched Withers so hard that she broke her nose and she had to go to the hospital. After an intermission, the play continued.
