= Artists Equity =

Film studio of Ben Affleck and Matt Damon

- Type: Private
- Industry: Production company
- Predecessor: Pearl Street Films
- Founded: November 2022; 4 years ago
- Founders: Ben Affleck; Matt Damon
- Headquarters: Los Angeles County, California, U.S.
- Key people: Ben Affleck (CEO & Partner); Matt Damon (CCO & Partner); Gerry Cardinale (Partner); Luciana Bozán Damon (Partner); Dillon West (COO)
- Website: artistsequity.com

Artists Equity is an American production company founded by actors and filmmakers Ben Affleck and Matt Damon in November 2022.

== History ==
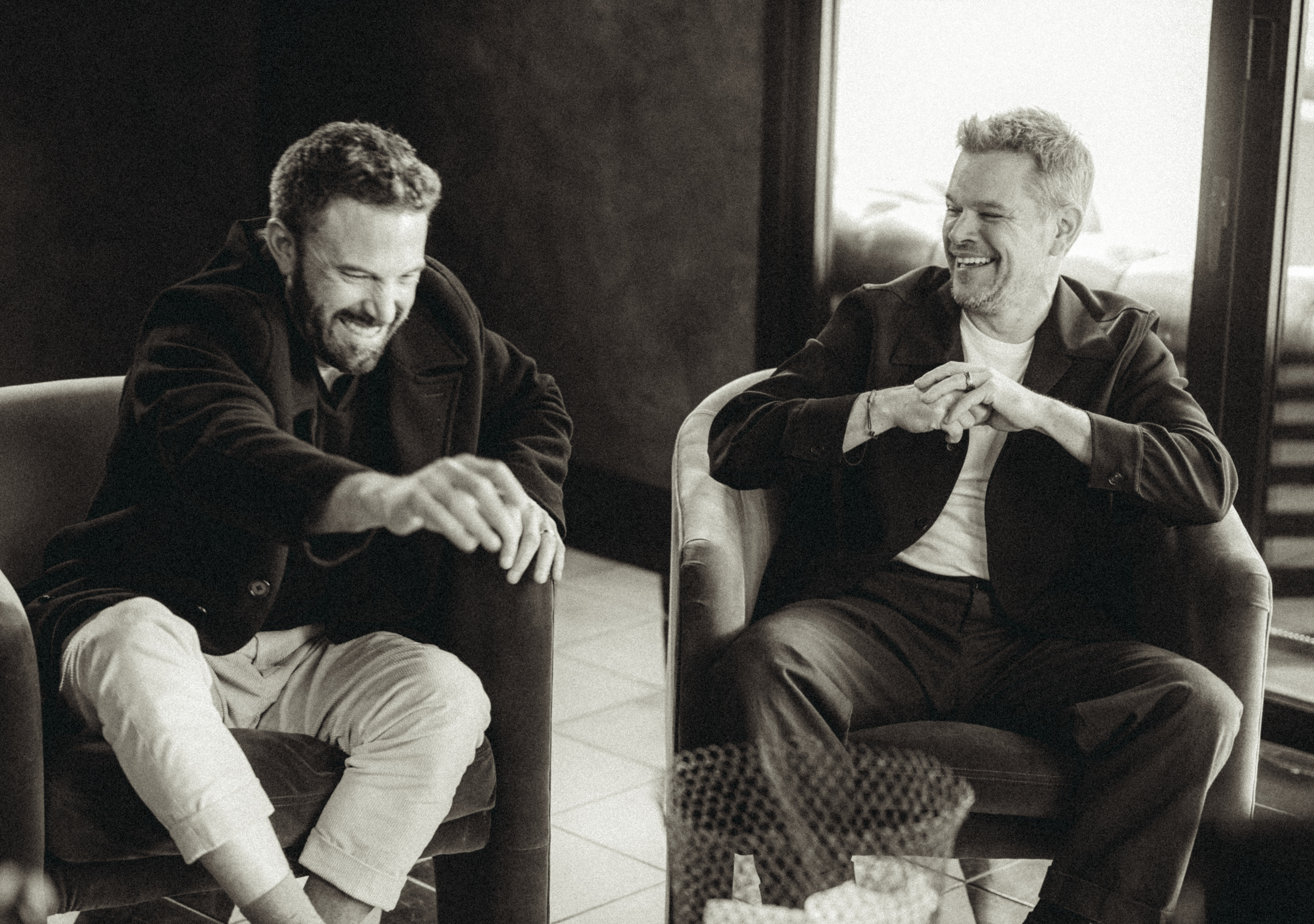
The company's founders Ben Affleck (left) and Matt Damon (right) in 2023

In June 2022, It was announced that American actors and filmmakers Ben Affleck and Matt Damon would be launching a new production company with financial backing from American investor Gerry Cardinale through his investment management firm RedBird Capital. In November 2022, the company was founded by Affleck and Damon, who partnered with Cardinale and received financial backing from RedBird Capital.

The company's management consists of Affleck as chief executive officer, co-founder and partner, Damon as chief creative officer, co-founder and partner, Cardinale as partner, Luciana Bozán Damon as partner, and Dillon West as the company's chief operating officer. In December 2025, the studio hired Amy Baer as president of film and television. The company is headquartered in Los Angeles County, California.

In 2023, the company's first film, Air, directed by and starring Affleck as Phil Knight, and Damon as Sonny Vaccaro, premiered at South by Southwest on March 18, 2023, and was released worldwide on April 5, 2023. The film is based on true events about the origin of Air Jordan, a basketball shoeline by professional basketball player Michael Jordan and Nike, Inc. The film grossed $90 million worldwide, and received positive reviews from critics, earning Golden Globe Award nominations for Best Motion Picture – Musical or Comedy and Best Actor – Motion Picture Musical or Comedy for Damon's performance.

Also in 2023, the company's first documentary film, Kiss the Future, documents the underground music scene in Sarajevo during the Bosnian War, and covers U2's involvement in bringing attention to the Siege of Sarajevo and their 1997 concert in the city. The documentary film premiered at the 73rd Berlin International Film Festival in February 2023, and was released cinematically by AMC Theatres in February 2024.

In 2024, the company worked on the productions of The Greatest Love Story Never Told (2024), a music documentary film about the making of the album This Is Me... Now by American entertainer Jennifer Lopez, and the historical drama film Small Things like These (2024), starring and produced by Cillian Murphy, which is based on the 2021 novel of the same name by Claire Keegan. They also released a heist thriller comedy film, The Instigators on Apple TV Plus, starring Matt Damon and Casey Affleck, directed by Doug Liman and written by Chuck Maclean and Casey, and the biographical sports drama film Unstoppable, based on the book of the same name by Anthony Robles and Austin Murphy, directed by William Goldenberg, and starring Lopez.

In 2025, Artists Equity produced the action thriller film The Accountant 2 for Amazon MGM Studios, a sequel to The Accountant (2016) directed by Gavin O'Connor, written by Bill Dubuque, and starring Affleck, Jon Bernthal, J.K. Simmons, and Cynthia Addai-Robinson.

Some of the company's recent productions include the musical drama film Kiss of the Spider Woman (2025), based on the novel and musical of the same name, directed by Bill Condon and starring Lopez, The Rip (2026) for Netflix, starring Damon and Affleck and directed by Joe Carnahan, and Believers: Boston Red Sox, a 2025 documentary directed by Gotham Chopra and Lauren Fisher about the Boston Red Sox.

In 2025, the company had signed a first-look deal with Sony Pictures Entertainment for its theatrical titles. In 2026, the company had signed a first-look deal with Netflix.

== Artists Equity Advertising ==
Artists Equity Advertising produces commercials for global companies. The department developed Super Bowl commercials for brands including Dunkin' Donuts and Stella Artois that feature major talent. Recent projects include Dunkin Donuts’ Sabrina’s Day Dream Refresher and Stella Artois’ David and Dave.

== Filmography ==
=== Film ===
Year	Title	Director	Gross (worldwide)	Notes	Ref.
2023	Air	Ben Affleck	$90.1 million	with Mandalay Pictures, Skydance Sports, and Amazon Studios	
2023	Kiss the Future	Nenad Cicin-Sain	—N/a	with Fifth Season and In Cahoots Production	
2024	The Greatest Love Story Never Told	Jason Bergh	—N/a	with Amazon MGM Studios	
2024	Small Things like These	Tim Mielants	$13 million	with Big Things Films	
2024	The Instigators	Doug Liman	$11,106 (Note: The Instigators received a limited theatrical release on August 2nd, with a release on Apple TV+ on August 9th.)	with Studio 8, The Walsh Company, and Apple Studios	
2024	Unstoppable	William Goldenberg	—N/a	with Nuyorican Productions and Metro-Goldwyn-Mayer	
2025	Kiss of the Spider Woman	Bill Condon	$2 million	with Nuyorican Productions, Josephson Entertainment, Tom Kirdahy Productions and 1000 Eyes	
2025	Believers: Boston Red Sox	Gotham Chopra and Lauren Fisher		with ESPN and Religion of Sports	
2025	The Python Hunt	Xander Robin	—N/a	with To Be Formed	
2025	The Accountant 2	Gavin O'Connor	$101.9 million	with Metro-Goldwyn-Mayer, Warner Bros. Pictures, Zero Gravity Management and 51 Entertainment	
2025	The Merchants of Joy	Celia Aniskovich	—N/a	with Amazon MGM Studios, Boat Rocker Studios, Epic and Dial Tone Films	
2026	The Rip	Joe Carnahan	—N/a	with Netflix	
2026	Jail Time Records	Dione Roach; Steve Happi	—N/a		
2026	Animals	Ben Affleck	—N/a	with Netflix, Fifth Season and Makeready	

==== In production ====
- Free Byrd (with Seven Bucks Productions and Ethos)
- Turbulence: The Greatest Mind in F1
- Shot in the Dark (with Hidden Content, Ultraboom Media and Icki Eneo Arlo)

== Recent Artists Equity Advertising campaigns ==
- Dunkin’ Drive Thru (2/12/23) directed by Ben Affleck
- Dunkin’ Ice Spice (9/12/23) directed by Ben Affleck and Brandon Pierce
- Dunkin’ DunKings (2/11/24) directed by Ben Affleck and Brandon Pierce
- Dunkin’ Dunkalatte (9/9/24) directed by Ben Affleck and Brandon Pierce
- Dunkin’ Shakin’ (12/30/24) directed by Dave Meyers
- Dunkin’ DunKings 2.0 (2/9/25) directed by Ben Affleck and Brandon Pierce
- Stella Artois David & Dave (2/4/25) directed by Ben Affleck and Brandon Pierce
- Dunkin’ Sabrina’s Day Dream Refresher (6/25/25) directed by Nadia Lee Cohen
- Dunkin’ Value Affleck (9/15/25) directed by Jimmy Tatro
