= Austin Murphy (writer) =

American author and journalist

Austin Murphy is an American journalist and author whose 2012 book, Unstoppable, co-written with NCAA wrestling champion Anthony Robles, was the basis for the movie of the same name. Produced by Artists Equity, co-owned by Ben Affleck and Matt Damon, the film debuted on January 16, 2025, after a limited theatrical release.

Murphy wrote for Sports Illustrated for 33 years before corporate downsizing made him an Amazon delivery truck driver in 2018. After chronicling that experience for The Atlantic, he was hired in 2019 as a reporter for The Press Democrat in Santa Rosa, CA.

In 2025, Murphy won the Grand Slam of the Petaluma, CA-based West Side Stories story-slam competition.

Books

• Sports Illustrated—The Super Bowl: Sport's Greatest Championship (Sports Illustrated, 1998)

- The Sweet Season: A Sportswriter Rediscovers Football, Family, and a Bit of Faith at Minnesota's St. John's University (2001)
- How Tough Could It Be?: The Trials and Errors of a Sportswriter Turned Stay-at-Home Dad (Henry Holt & Co., Owl Books, 2004)
- Saturday Rules: A Season with Trojans and Domers (and Gators and Buckeyes and Wolverines) (Harper, 2007)
- The Happiness of Pursuit: A Father's Courage, a Son's Love and Life's Steepest Climb (with Davis Phinney) (Houghton Mifflin Harcourt, 2011)
- Unstoppable: From Underdog to Undefeated: How I Became a Champion (with Anthony Robles) (Gotham Books, a member of the Penguin Group, 2012)
- Nine Miracles: When Bullets Can't Kill and Hope Prevails (Radius Book Group, distributed by Simon & Schuster, 2025).
