= Kyle Maynard =

American mixed martial arts (MMA) fighter

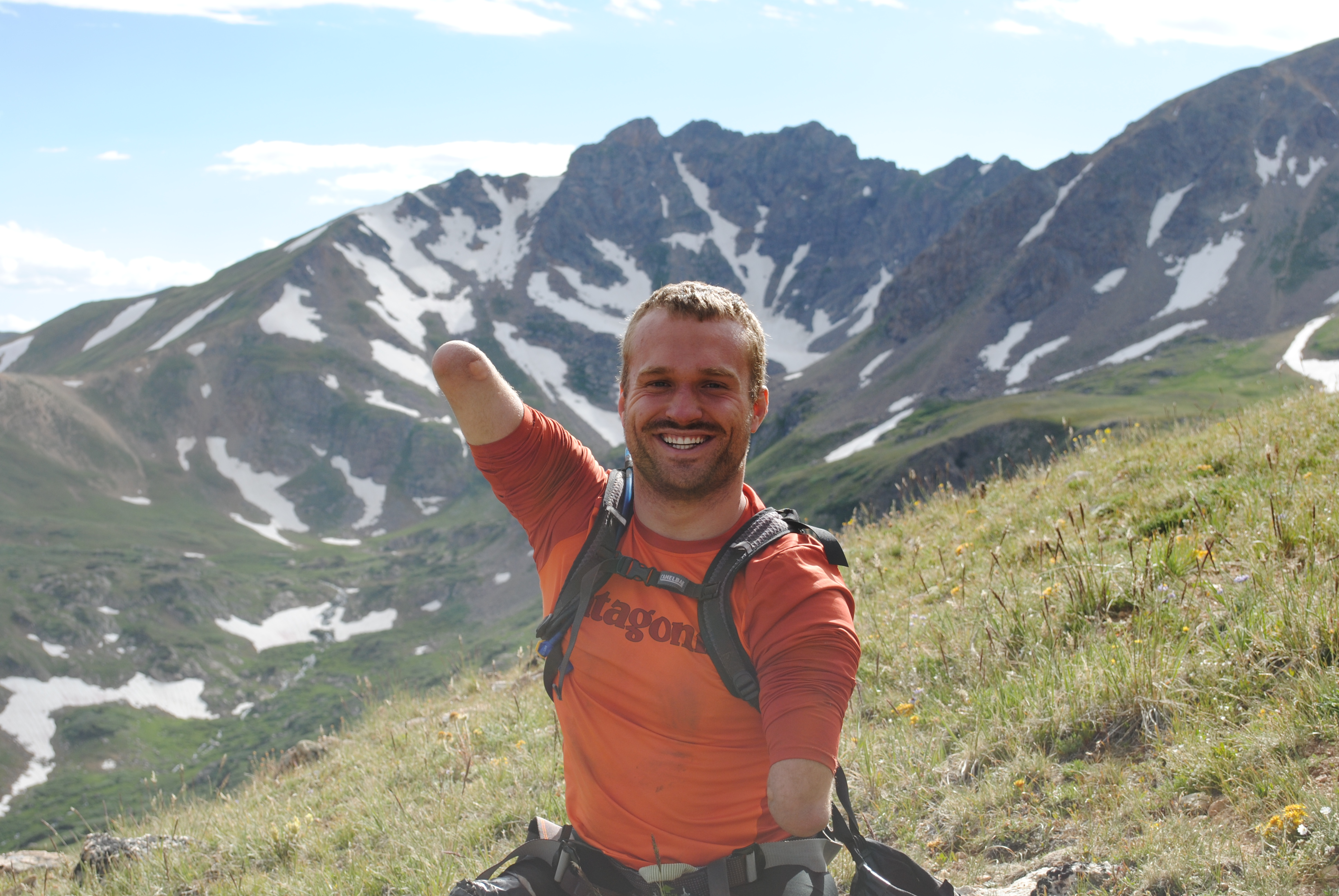
- Born: March 24, 1986 (age 40); Washington, D.C.
- Occupations: Motivational speaker, author, No Excuses CrossFit gym owner
- Awards: 2004 ESPY-Best Disabled Athlete, National Wrestling Hall of Fame, GNC's Worlds Strongest Teen, Presidents Award for the Sports Humanitarian Hall of Fame, U.S. Jaycees Top Ten Outstanding Young Americans. 2012 ESPY-Male Athlete with a Disability
- Website: kyle-maynard.com

Kyle Maynard (born March 24, 1986) is an American speaker, author and mixed martial arts athlete, known for becoming the first quadruple amputee to ascend Mount Kilimanjaro without the aid of prosthetics. He is also founder of the No Excuses Crossfit gym.

== Early sports career ==
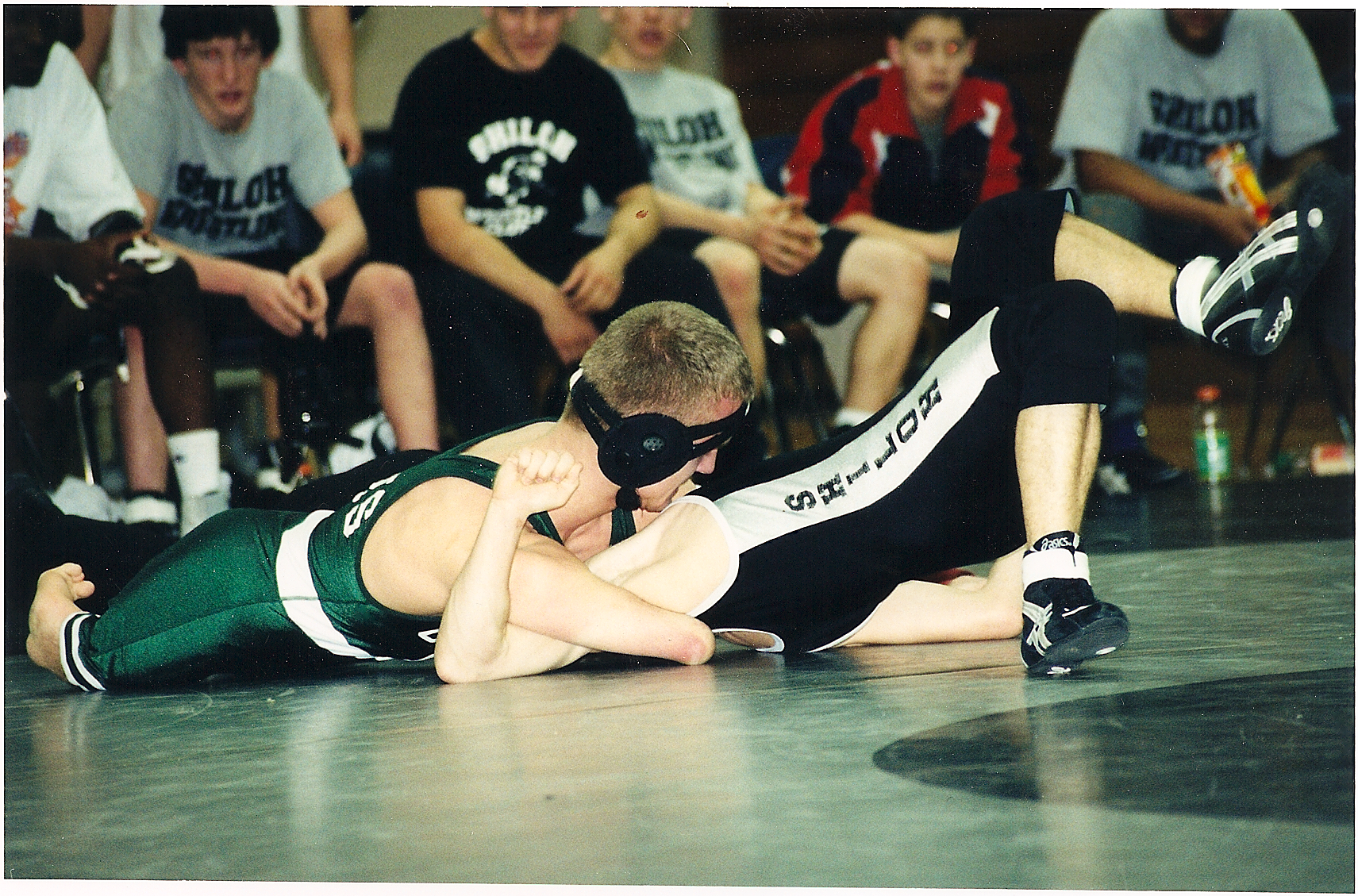
Kyle Maynard

Although he was born with a rare condition known as congenital amputation, where fibrous bands prevent the development of fetal limbs, Maynard decided to pursue involvement in sports, first in youth league football, where he played nose tackle for the Collins Hill National Eagles at age 11. He wrestled in high school, ultimately winning 36 matches in his senior year of high school. He went on to place 12th in the 103-pound weight class. Maynard also began weight training, and was awarded the title of GNC's World's Strongest Teen by bench pressing 23 repetitions of 240 lbs.

The same year, he received the ESPN Espy Award for Best Athlete With A Disability in 2004. Maynard appeared in both Vanity Fair and the Abercrombie & Fitch Stars on the Rise catalog. He was also the recipient of the 2004 President's Award for the Sports Humanitarian Hall of Fame. He went on to attend the University of Georgia and was a part of their wrestling team, but left shortly after starting his education to promote his book and pursue a speaking career. While attending the University of Georgia, he began work as a speaker for the Washington Speaker's Bureau, specializing in motivational speeches. He was also featured on talk shows including The Oprah Winfrey Show and Larry King Live.

== No Excuses ==
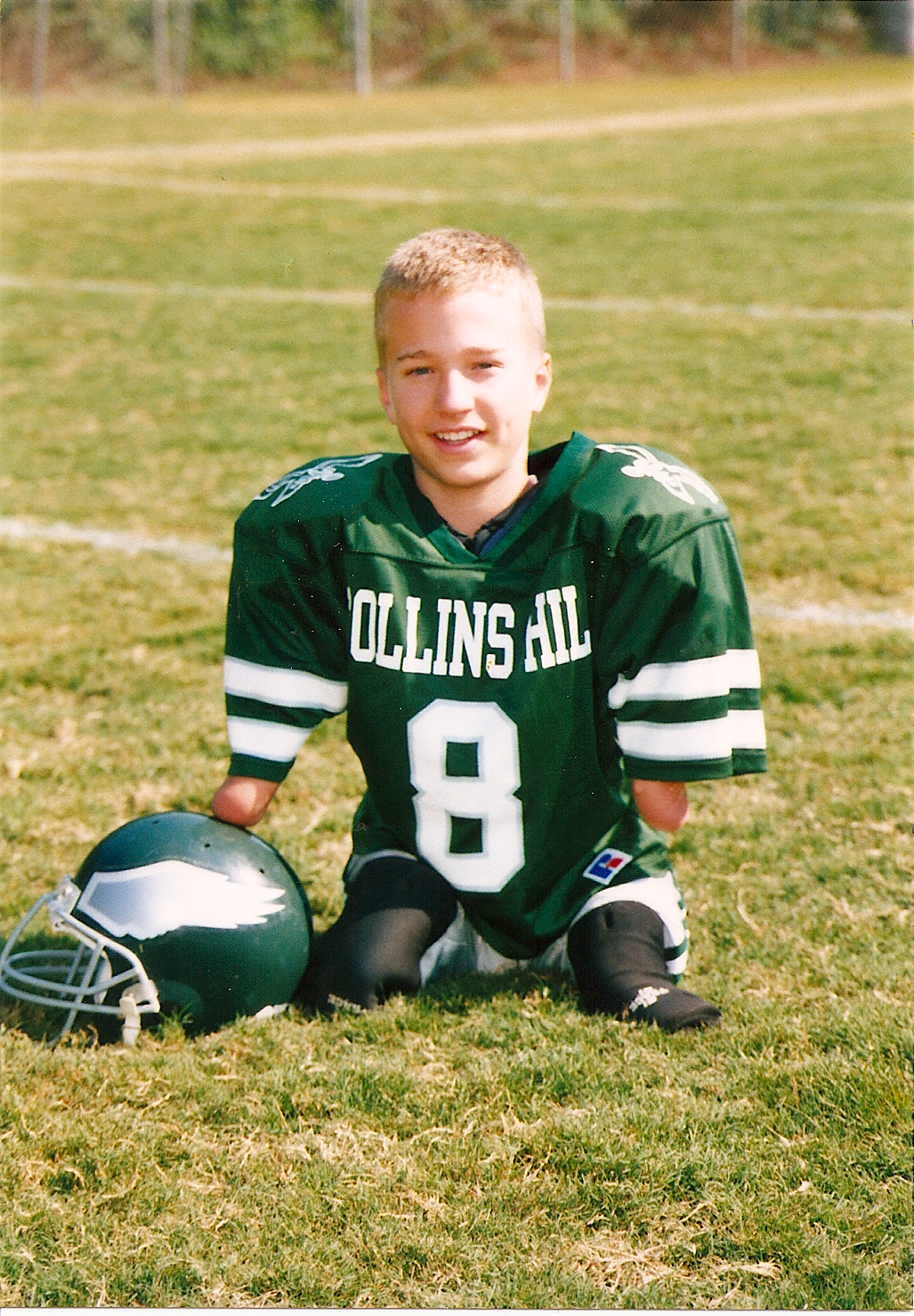
Kyle Maynard in his uniform for the Collins Hill National Eagles.

In 2005, Maynard wrote the New York Times Bestselling autobiography, No Excuses: The True Story of a Congenital Amputee Who Became a Champion in Wrestling and in Life. Published by Regnery Publishing, the book made the New York Times Bestseller list, peaking at number 12. Shortly after, he was inducted into both the Georgia State Wrestling Hall of Fame and as the National Wrestling Hall of Fame in Oklahoma. In 2007, he was named one of the U.S. Jaycees Top Ten Outstanding Young Americans. In 2017, Maynard was featured on the cover of DIVERSEability magazine's Fall 2016 issue.

== No Excuses Crossfit Gym ==
In 2008, Maynard opened No Excuses Crossfit gym, a crossfit-intensive facility located in Suwanee, Georgia.

== MMA career ==
In 2005, Maynard began training in mixed martial arts (MMA), and was denied a fighter's license by the Georgia Athletic and Entertainment Commission in 2007, before opting to fight in Alabama, where MMA was unregulated. His amateur debut fight was at Auburn Fight Night at the Auburn Covered Arena in Auburn, Alabama on April 25, 2009. He lost the fight to Bryan Fry on a 30–27 judges' decision.

In 2010, he was the subject of a documentary film, A Fighting Chance, which focused on his MMA efforts. Directed by Takashi Doscher and Alex Shofner and was produced Ted Leonsis, the film was later released on DVD, with a portion of the proceeds going to benefit wounded veterans.

=== Mixed martial arts record ===
Professional record breakdown
1 match	0 wins	1 loss
By knockout	0	0
By submission	0	0
By decision	0	1

Res.	Record	Opponent	Method	Event	Date	Round	Time	Location	Notes
Loss	0-1	Bryan Fry	Decision (unanimous)		April 25, 2009	3	5:00	Auburn, Alabama	

== Ascent of Mount Kilimanjaro ==
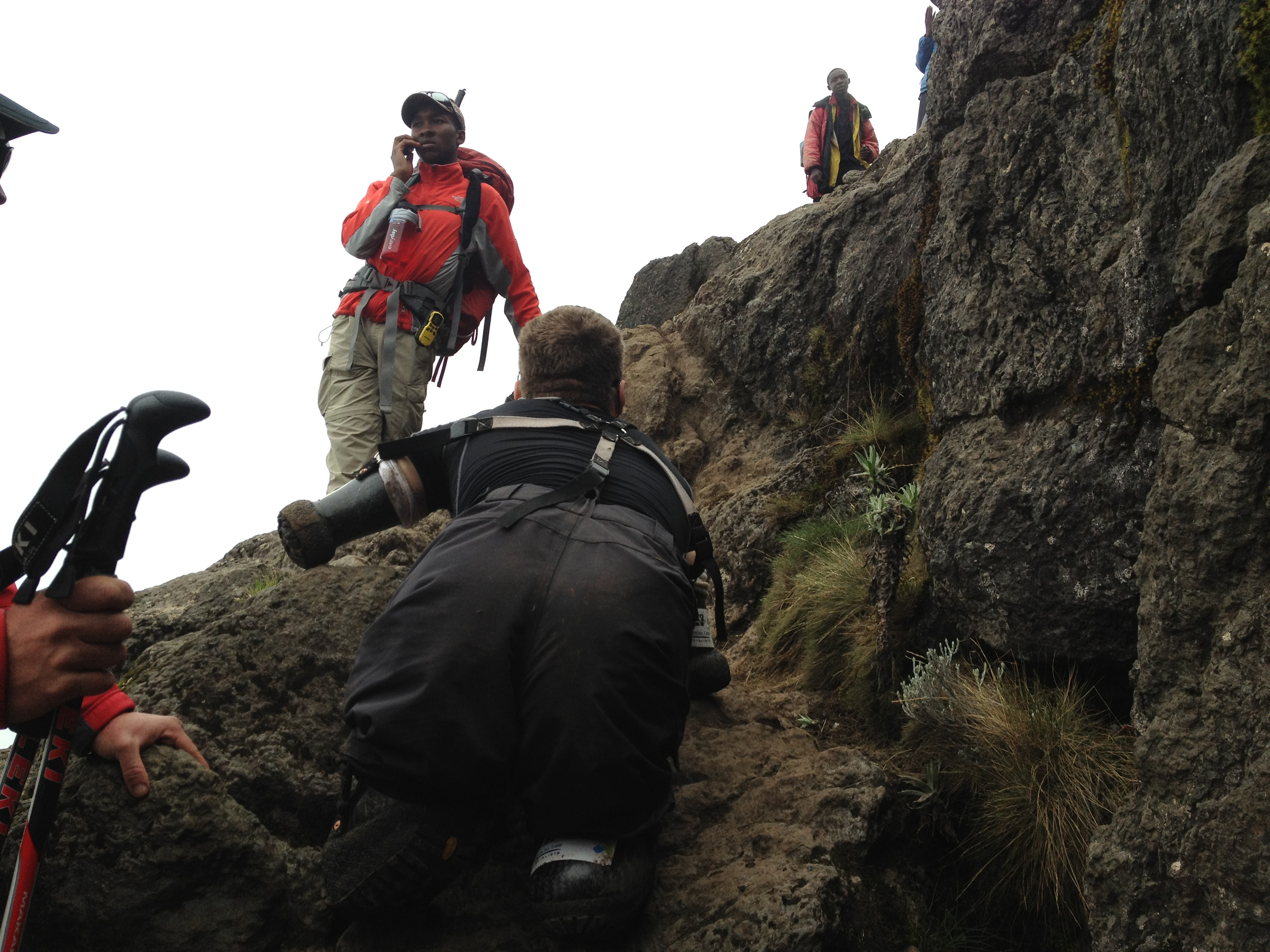
Maynard is the first quadruple amputee to climb Mount Kilimanjaro without the aid of prosthetics.

In 2011, it was announced that Maynard was planning to climb Mount Kilimanjaro without the aid of prosthetics. To prepare for the climb, he trained at a series of locations around the US, including Stone Mountain and Blood Mountain in Georgia, Winter Park in Colorado, and Camelback Mountain in Arizona, with expedition co-leader, Dan Adams, testing and developing equipment that included welding sleeves and rubber bicycle tires attached to his body with heavy-duty tape. Soon, an organization called Orthotic Specialists got involved, and owners Barb and Brett Boutin created custom equipment with Vibram soles, based on molds of Maynard's arms and legs.

The climb, intended to raise awareness for wounded American military veterans, included a team consisting of former members of the U.S. military with injuries and conditions including shrapnel wounds, post-traumatic stress and traumatic brain injury. The mission also donated $25,000 worth of medical supplies to the Mwereni Integrated School for the Blind in Moshi, Tanzania. Guided by Kevin Cherilla of K2 Adventures Foundation, the group began their climb on January 6, 2012, with 16 days allotted for the climb. On January 15, 2012, Maynard became the first quadruple amputee to climb Mount Kilimanjaro without assistance, by crawling all 19,340 feet in just 10 days. In 2012, he was awarded his second ESPY for best male athlete with a disability for completing the climb.

== Nike Commercial ==
In August, 2016, Kyle appeared in a commercial as part of Nike's "Unlimited" series. The video has been viewed over 1.5 million times.
