= HauntedWeen =

- VHS cover
- Directed by: W. Doug Robertson
- Written by: W. Doug Robertson
- Screenplay by: W. Doug Robertson; Kurt A. Swauger
- Produced by: W.R. McCormack; Edward Rhein; Cory Lash
- Starring: Brian Blakely; Blake Pickett; Ethan Adler
- Cinematography: Cory Lash
- Edited by: Cory Lash
- Music by: Ernest Raymer
- Production company: Hometown Productions Of Los Angeles
- Distributed by: Consumer Video Distributors; Vinegar Syndrome
- Release date: 1991
- Running time: 88 minutes
- Country: United States
- Language: English
- Budget: $160,000

HauntedWeen is a 1991 slasher film written and directed by W. Doug Robertson. The film was shot in Bowling Green, Kentucky, after which it took the director two years to release onto home video. HauntedWeen centers upon a fraternity fundraiser held in an abandoned haunted house, where the staff is slaughtered by the masked son of the attraction's original owner.

A sequel was planned, but was never released.

== Synopsis ==
The film begins in 1971, in the fictional town of Reguaws, Kentucky, with a young Eddie Burber collecting admission for his mother's haunted house, as he has been told that he is too young to work inside. Frustrated, Eddie decides to sneak into the house and scare a girl around his age. The scare turns deadly and the girl is impaled on a spike. Eddie decapitates her before growing frightened and running into a nearby field. He is retrieved by his mother and the two flee to a cabin in the woods, where they live for the next twenty years. This seemingly peaceful life is interrupted when Eddie's mother dies, causing the man to snap and return with her body to their now closed and abandoned haunted house.

Meanwhile, Sigma Phi, a nearby fraternity of the Tophill State College, is at risk of losing their charter, as they are behind on their dues. They decide to hold a fundraiser party. This proves to be unsuccessful as they are unable to attract enough participants and end up spending almost all of their funds on alcohol to keep the party going. During the party Eddie arrives at the home claiming to be a former member. He performs the secret salute, which he learned as a young man. He gives them a key and suggests that they reopen the old haunted house, which the members think is an excellent idea. Several of the members and their friends then fix up the house, unaware that Eddie has already killed one of the brothers and his girlfriend.

The fraternity opens the haunted house for a single night. Initially things go well and they make a large amount of money in a short period of time. However soon after Eddie appears and starts slaughtering several of the brothers and volunteers. Some of the murders occur in front of patrons, who assume that it is part of the show. Eventually the truth is revealed by one of the surviving brothers, Hanks, causing everyone to flee. Hanks overpowers Eddie with a flame thrower. He walks away, assuming that Eddie is now dead. This is shown to be wrong, as Eddie then bursts out of the barn driving a van. Kurt shoots at the van, which explodes into flame. Despite this, the van continues to drive away as the film cuts to the credits.

== Cast ==
- Brian Blakely as Kurt
- Blake Pickett as Mel
- Brad Hanks as Hanks
- Leslee Lacey as Sally
- Ethan Adler as Eddie Burber
  - Craig Bitterling as Young Eddie
- Bently Tittle as Bentley
- Tim Hubbard as Jack
- Franklin Martin as Farris
- Dan McNamara as Listen
- Angela Scanlan as JoAnne
- Lori Rae Nally as Donna
- Bart White as the Sheriff
- Pat Sprouse as Eddie's Mother

== Development ==
Robertson has stated that it took him about three months to write the film's script and that pre-production took six weeks. HauntedWeen was filmed in Bowling Green, Kentucky, during August 1989, over a period of 23 days on 16 mm film and with a budget of around $160,000. It would take him about two years to release the movie to home video. Locations used for the film included the Western Kentucky University campus.

== Release ==
HauntedWeen was initially intended to release during October 1990. This release was delayed until the following year; Robertson was offered three distribution contracts, however he chose to release it independently on VHS through Consumer Video Distributors at the Video Software Dealers Association convention in July 1991. 2,628 copies of the film were sold to directly to video stores at the convention, with the promise that if the VHS did not rent, stores could return the copies for a refund. Per Robertson, they made about $22,000 and none of the copies sold were returned.

In 2011 the film received a 20th anniversary DVD release and was screened at Western Kentucky University's South Lawn. The movie was later released through Vinegar Syndrome as part of a three-disc Blu-ray box set along with Christopher Lewis's Revenge and Michael O'Rourke's Deadly Love.

== Intended sequel ==
In 2015 Robertson announced his intent to create a direct-to-video sequel, Hauntedween 2: The Revenge of Eddie Burber, with Dustin Ferguson. The film would have been set 25 years after the events of the first movie and would have featured Tuesday Knight in an unspecified role. A crowdfunding campaign was run through Indiegogo, but raised only $385 out of a requested $5000.

Director Doug Robertson died in 2020.

== Reception ==
After the film's 20th anniversary, it was reviewed by Bleeding Skull and by Ben Nagy of JoeBobBriggs.com, the latter of whom rated it four stars, calling it "a special, earnest movie that mashes up Halloween, a 1980s college frat sex comedy, and the performance-art aspects of Blood Sucking Freaks." Dread Central also recommended HauntedWeen, calling it an underrated Halloween horror film. Yasmina Ketita reviewed HauntedWeen for Rue Morgue, calling it "acceptable".
