= Gerry Cardinale =

American businessman (born 1967)

- Born: May 8, 1967 (age 59); Villanova, Pennsylvania, U.S.
- Citizenship: United States; Italy
- Education: Harvard University; Oxford University
- Occupations: Businessman; investor; philanthropist
- Organization: RedBird Capital Partners
- Known for: AC Milan; Artists Equity; Legends Hospitality; Yankees Entertainment and Sports Network (YES)
- Website: redbirdcap.com

Gerald Joseph Cardinale (born May 8, 1967) is an American-Italian businessman, private equity investor and philanthropist. Cardinale is the founder, managing partner and chief investment officer of RedBird Capital Partners LLC. He has been described as a “key architect” in the acquisition of Warner Bros. Discovery by Paramount Skydance.

== Early life and education ==
Cardinale was born in Villanova, Pennsylvania, and studied at Harvard University and at Oxford University as a Rhodes Scholar. He was a rower at Harvard and on the Oxford men's reserve crew, Isis, in the 1990 Oxford-Cambridge Boat Race.

After graduating from Oxford, he received a fellowship to work in Tokyo for the Japan Institute of International Affairs, an affiliate of the Japanese Foreign Ministry.

== Career ==
Cardinale began his professional career at Goldman Sachs in 1992 and transferred to the firm's Merchant Banking Division in 1994, where he helped build the firm's investment business in Hong Kong, China and Singapore. He returned to New York in 1997 and was elected partner in 2004. He was responsible for investments across a range of industries and investment types. He worked with entrepreneurs and family business owners to build several multi-billion-dollar companies.

Cardinale worked with New York Yankees owner George Steinbrenner to create the Yankees Entertainment & Sports ("YES") Network in 2001. Cardinale led the deal process between the Yankees, Goldman Sachs and other investors, culminating in the sale of the network to News Corporation in 2012 for a total value of $3.4 billion.

Cardinale also created a partnership with the New York Yankees and Dallas Cowboys owner Jerry Jones to create Legends Hospitality in 2008.

=== RedBird Capital Partners ===
Following Cardinale's retirement from Goldman Sachs in 2012, he launched RedBird Capital Partners, a private investment firm that focuses on dealmaking and business growth in sports, media, entertainment and financial services.

Notable investments include the Italian professional football club AC Milan that competes in Serie A, where Cardinale is the owner and on the board of directors. The company is an investor in Skydance Media, where it merged Paramount Global to form Paramount Skydance in August 2025. RedBird provided a round of $4 billion in equity financing following Paramount Skydance's acquisition of Warner Bros. Discovery which was closed on October 6, 2026 and subsequently renamed to as Skydance Corporation. The company also has stakes in Fenway Sports Group and the United Football League.

In 2015, Cardinale worked with team owners in the National Football League (NFL) to create On Location Experiences, which offered premium live experiences across the NFL and other sports. On Location Experiences was sold to Ari Emanuel's Endeavor in 2020 for $660 million. Cardinale has not indicated an interest in buying into an NFL franchise; he stated in 2025 that franchises were overpriced, that the closely held nature of NFL teams caused finances to be too obscure to properly assess teams' financial health, and that the minority stake that RedBird could afford at that time provided too little shareholder influence for him to operate a franchise the way he would want.

Cardinale is also active in content production in the film and television industry, and is a co-founder along with Ben Affleck and Matt Damon of Artists Equity, which released 2023's Air.

== Personal life and philanthropy ==
Cardinale and his family live in Palm Beach, Florida.

He is on the boards of the Mount Sinai Health System and the US Rowing Foundation.
