= Hamid Biglari =

Iranian American business executive

- Education: Cornell University (BA); Princeton University (PhD)
- Occupations: Entrepreneur, Finance Executive
- Known for: Senior Partner at RedBird Capital, Former Vice Chairman at Citigroup, member of the Council on Foreign Relations
- Awards: Ellis Island Medal of Honor (2009), Carnegie Corporation Great Immigrants (2012)

Hamid Biglari is a finance executive and entrepreneur serving as senior partner at RedBird Capital Partners. He was formerly a vice chairman at Citigroup.

== Career ==
Biglari began his career as a theoretical nuclear physicist. In 1987 he was a theoretical physicist at the Princeton Plasma Physics Laboratory, writing an influential paper on Tokamak fusion research. The paper had received over 2,000 citations as of 2024.

He later transitioned to finance, first working at McKinsey & Company. Despite his background in physics, he brought skills in complex computer modeling for financial risk assessment, which led the consultancy to make him partner within four years.

In 2000 he moved to Citigroup, where he served as Vice Chairman and Global Head of Emerging Markets. He worked alongside Sandy Weill, Bob Rubin and Vikram Pandit in various executive roles. After Citigroup, Biglari joined Point72 Asset Management.

He was active in government affairs between Iran and the United States amidst the nuclear agreement signed by the two countries in 2015. To support Iran's economic development, he helped organize an event in Berlin called iBridges that brought together Iranian tech entrepreneurs and global contracts and investors. He was also one of 24 prominent Iranian-American signatories of an open letter promoting diplomacy between the United States and Iran in 2015.

In 2022, Biglari joined as the senior partner and Chairman of Asset Management & Financial Services at RedBird Capital Partners. He oversees artificial intelligence initiatives for the firm and its portfolio companies.

== Early life and education ==
Born in Iran, Biglari immigrated to the U.S. in 1977 to study mathematics and physics at Cornell University. He holds a Ph.D. in Astrophysical Sciences from Princeton University, where his research contributed to theoretical physics and astrophysics.

== Awards and recognition ==
In 2009, Biglari was awarded the Ellis Island Medal of Honor, recognizing his contributions to the United States as an immigrant and philanthropic efforts and contributions to public policy. In 2012, he was awarded the Carnegie Corporation Great Immigrants award.

== Board memberships ==
Biglari holds positions on several boards, including the Asia Society and being a Member of the Council on Foreign Relations.
