= Anthony Robles =

American wrestler (born 1988)

Personal information
- Born: July 20, 1988 (age 37) La Mirada, California, U.S.
- Home town: Mesa, Arizona, U.S.
- Height: 5 ft 8 in (173 cm)

Sport
- Sport: Wrestling
- Event(s): Freestyle and Folkstyle
- College team: Arizona State
Medal record
Men's collegiate wrestling
Representing the Arizona State Sun Devils
NCAA Division I Championships
Gold medal – first place	2011 Philadelphia	125 lb
Pac-10 Championships
Gold medal – first place	2009 Fullerton	125 lb
Gold medal – first place	2010 Davis	125 lb
Gold medal – first place	2011 Corvallis	125 lb
Silver medal – second place	2008 Eugene	125 lb

Anthony Robles (born July 15, 1988) is an American wrestler who won the 2011 NCAA individual wrestling national championship in the 125-pound weight class, despite being born with only one leg. He is the author of the book Unstoppable: From Underdog to Undefeated: How I Became a Champion (Gotham Books), which was published in September 2012.

== Youth ==
Robles was born with only one leg for unknown reasons, but refused to wear a prosthetic leg, removing it at the age of 3. Due to his leg missing all the way up to the hip, he has no stump to attach a prosthetic limb to. He endeavored to work around his missing leg, strengthening his body with various exercises. When Robles was in the sixth grade, he set a record for the most pushups by a member of his school. He began wrestling in the eighth grade, joining in while watching one of his older cousins practice.

As a freshman at Mesa High School, Robles had a record of 5–8 and ranked last in the city of Mesa, Arizona, disadvantaged by being 10 pounds underweight for his weight class. Robles benefited, however, from tremendous grip strength from his use of crutches. After intensive training, Robles found that he could use his unusually high center of gravity to defend against attack, and became skilled at several offensive moves including one he created. In his second year, Robles was ranked sixth in Arizona. His junior and senior years, Robles went 96–0 and won two Arizona state championships. Robles also won a national championship as a senior, and finished his high school wrestling career with a record of 129–15.

== Arizona State ==
Despite Robles' great high school success, none of his top choices for college—Iowa, Oklahoma State, and Cornell—recruited him. Robles redshirted as a freshman at Arizona State University, and finished 6th in the 2006 FILA Junior World Championships in the 55 kg Freestyle Wrestling category. He started his collegiate wrestling career in 2007–08, where he was nationally ranked and finished the year with a record of 25–11, falling just short of being named as an All-American. In his second competitive year as a collegiate wrestler (2008–2009), Robles earned All-American Honors, finishing the year 29–8, winning the Pacific-10 Conference championship at 125 pounds and finishing fourth in the NCAA Championship's 125 pound weight class tournament. In 2009–10, Robles again earned All-American honors, finishing seventh in the NCAA 125 pound weight class, going 32–4 on the season, and repeating as the Pac-10 125 pound wrestling champion.

In Robles' final year of eligibility (2010–11), he went undefeated, going 36–0 on the year, becoming a three-time Pac-10 champion (defeating Jason Lara from Oregon State in the final,) and a national champion, defeating the defending 125-pound NCAA Champion, Iowa's Matt McDonough, 7–1 in the final. For his efforts, Robles was voted the Tournament's Most Outstanding Wrestler.

The 5'8" Robles concluded his Arizona State wrestling career with a record of 122–23, a three-time Pac-10 wrestling champion as well as a three-time All-American. Robles ranks 8th for most match wins by an Arizona State wrestler.

== 2010s and Early 2020s ==
Robles has stated that he wishes to become a motivational speaker, specifically for those who face similar challenges. "My spirit is unconquerable... I don't care what's probable. Through blood, sweat, and tears, I am unstoppable." is the quote from Robles's book Unstoppable that he says is the overall message of the book.

Robles has been a commentator of the NCAA Division I Wrestling Championships since 2012.

Robles set the world record for most pull-ups in one minute, with 62, at halftime of a New York Jets game in November 2018.

He married Laura Robles in late 2021; they have a son who was born on December 28, 2022. In 2022, he began to work as the wrestling coach for his high school Alma Mater at Mesa High. He held this position for 2 years.

== Movie ==
In March 2023, Ben Affleck and Matt Damon's production company Artists Equity announced in partnership with Amazon MGM Studios that they would produce a biopic based on Robles's book, both of which are titled Unstoppable, with Jharrel Jerome and Jennifer Lopez slated to portray Robles and his mother Judy, respectively. The movie was released at the Toronto International Film festival, TIFF, September 6, 2024 and in the United States, December 6, 2024. It won 9 awards at various film festivals including "Tribute Performer award" at TIFF. Critics on the Rotten tomatoes website are 77% positive regarding the film.

== Awards and honors ==
In January 2012, Robles was presented the 2011 Most Courageous Athlete Award by the Philadelphia Sports Writers Association.

== See also ==
- Jim Abbott, a former Major League Baseball pitcher born with only one hand
- Faldir Chahbari, a kickboxer with one functioning eye
- Pete Gray, Major League Baseball outfielder missing his right arm
- Shaquem Griffin, an American football player with one hand
- Kevin Laue, a basketball player with one hand
- Casey Martin, a disabled golfer
- Hunter Woodhall, a Paralympic gold medal runner with no lower legs
- Hari Budha Magar, a high altitude mountaineer and double above-knee amputee
- Nick Newell, a mixed martial artist with one hand
- Bert Shepard, who pitched in one game for the Washington Senators in 1945 after losing his right leg to amputation during World War II
- Dave Stevens, a baseball and football player without legs
- Matt Stutzman, American archer with no arms
