= RedBird Capital Partners =

American investment management firm founded in 2014

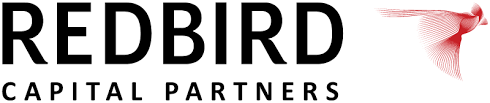
- Founded: 2014; 12 years ago
- Founder: Gerry Cardinale
- Headquarters: New York City, U.S.
- Key people: Gerry Cardinale (managing partner and CIO); John Thornton (chairman); Hamid Biglari (senior partner); Jeff Zucker (executive); Mansour bin Zayed Al Nahyan (investor)
- Subsidiaries: RedBird IMI (joint venture with International Media Investments)
- Website: redbirdcap.com

RedBird Capital Partners is an American investment management firm founded in 2014 in New York by American businessman Gerry Cardinale. The company has assets under management of over $15 billion as of 2026.

== Investments ==
RedBird is active in several tertiary sectors, such as consumer goods, financial services, telecommunications, media, technology and sports. RedBird has also invested in Ben Affleck and Matt Damon's film studio Artists Equity, LeBron James and Maverick Carter’s media production company SpringHill Company, and the Fenway Sports Group (FSG).

In August 2020, RedBird acquired a minority stake in YES Network, after helping Yankee Global Enterprises activate their buy back option to purchase Fox's 80% share for $3.5 billion after Disney acquired 21st Century Fox during the same year after the Department of Justice (DOJ) ordered Disney to sell the network on antitrust grounds due to its ownership of ESPN. On August 31, 2022, the company completed the acquisition of AC Milan from the U.S. fund Elliott Investment Management for €1.2b ($1.37 billion). RedBird also owns Toulouse, a club from the city of the same name that plays in Ligue 1 since 2020, as well as acquiring a minority stake in Liverpool in 2021.

In February 2020, RedBird invested in Skydance Media. In August 2020, the company acquired the assets of the XFL for $15 million, along with Dany Garcia and Dwayne Johnson, from the brand's founder, Vince McMahon.

In June 2023, former media executive Jeff Zucker joined as an executive at a RedBird subsidiary co-owned with International Media Investments (IMI), a state-funded enterprise of the United Arab Emirates (UAE) owned by Sheikh Mansour bin Zayed Al Nahyan. The joint venture, known as RedBird IMI, allows IMI to invest in RedBird's sports and entertainment properties. RedBird also has a cooperative investment fund with the sovereign wealth fund of Qatar.

In December 2023, RedBird announced a merger between the XFL and USFL to be called United Football League (UFL) starting in 2024. In July 2024, the company provided funding for Skydance Media's acquisition of National Amusements from the Redstone family and its controlling stake in Paramount Global, a transaction that included Paramount's merger with Skydance. On July 24, 2025, the merger was approved, and it closed on August 7, 2025.

In January 2024, RedBird Capital Partners led a $110 million Series D funding round for Build a Rocket Boy, an independent video game developer and publisher known for developing MindsEye and upcoming game Everywhere.

On November 23, 2024, Sky News reported that CVC Capital Partners, TF1, RedBird Capital Partners, All3Media, Mediawan, and Kohlberg Kravis Roberts had been linked to a potential takeover bid for British media company ITV and a possible break-up of core assets, such as ITV Studios and ITVX.

On January 30, 2025, Reuters reported that RedBird IMI were in early-stage talks with ITV to merge the All3Media and ITV Studios production businesses.

In May 2025, RedBird announced plans to acquire the Telegraph Media Group (TMG), publisher of daily British newspaper The Telegraph, for £500 million ($674 million). Several human rights groups, including Reporters Without Borders, Index on Censorship, Hong Kong Democracy Council, Hong Kong Watch, and Article 19, opposed the deal due to RedBird's links with China.

Beginning in September of 2025, RedBird partially financed Paramount Skydance's numerous takeover bids to acquire Warner Bros. Discovery (WBD). Following a months-long bidding war against Netflix, Paramount Skydance increased its offer for WBD's assets, prompting Netflix to withdraw from the bidding war. Paramount Skydance and WBD signed a definitive merger agreement the next day.

In July 2026, it was reported that several parties—including RedBird (backing Paramount Skydance) and American investment company TPG, along with Netflix, Sony Pictures, and Versant—were in early talks to purchase film discovery platform Letterboxd.

In October 2026, RedBird Capital Partners, led by Gerry Cardinale, invested $4 billion to finance Paramount's proposed merger with Warner Bros.
