= Long Shot: The Kevin Laue Story =

2013 basketball documentary

- Theatrical release poster
- Directed by: Franklin Martin
- Written by: Franklin Martin
- Produced by: Billy Raftery; Franklin Martin
- Edited by: Sam Citron; Tyler Lindsay; Jason Summers
- Music by: Robin Soper
- Production company: Dutchman Films
- Distributed by: Freestyle Releasing
- Release date: August 9, 2013 (USA)

Long Shot: The Kevin Laue Story is a 2013 documentary film directed by Franklin Martin with Dutchmen Films and Cinipix as producers. A teenager, Kevin Laue, pursues his dream to become the first one-armed man to play NCAA Division I basketball. The film documents the daily struggles of a young man coming to terms with his need for his deceased father's approval while battling obstacles to fulfill his dream.

== Synopsis ==
In the womb, Laue's umbilical cord was wrapped around his neck. Lack of circulation to the arm restrained by the cord meant it ended just below the elbow. Laue continued to face adversity; his father died when he was in middle school. A former athlete and youth coach, his father had difficulty accepting Kevin's disability. His family and the loss of his father became motivating factors to drive Kevin in his journey to become one of the elite few to play Division I basketball.

Laue's mother was left to beg the rival coach to let her 6’9” son have a chance to try out for his basketball team after refusals from all teams in her area. The five-year, father-son relationship began between Coach McKnight and Laue. McKnight saw something in Laue and gave him the chance, training, and skills Laue needed to complete his own goals. The film shows Laue as a 6’11” high-school student in a small California town, on a trip to meet the President, becoming a starter under multiple coaches, and finally in New York City.

== Filming ==
During the edit of Franklin Martin's first film, Walking On Dead Fish, Martin coached an AAU team during a tournament in Las Vegas. Martin was coaching a team playing against Laue and McKnight. Martin was immediately amazed by Laue's talent, then became astounded at the ability and technique that Laue possessed while only have one arm. Martin contacted McKnight and Laue immediately following the game. Upon McKnight's and Martin's first handshake, Martin had begun his second film where he shot for four years, following Kevin's path to his dreams. The documentary takes place in Pleasanton, CA; Los Angeles, CA; Berkeley, CA; New York City, NY; Fork Union, VA; and Pittsburgh, PA.

== Release ==
The film premiered in New York City on October 26, 2012, at the Quad Cinema. Long Shot: A Kevin Laue Story has been picked up by the production and distribution company Cinipix. Cinipix is proposing a fall theatrical release in select cities.

== Reception ==
Daniel M. Gold of the New York Times criticized the documentary's focus on the loss of Laue's father, but left a favorable review otherwise.
