= Franklin Martin =

American documentary film director, producer, screenwriter, former actor

Franklin Martin was an American documentary film director, producer, screenwriter and actor best known for his sport documentaries Walking on Dead Fish in (2008) and Long Shot: The Kevin Laue Story in 2012. He founded and ran the production company Dutchmen Films based in Los Angeles. He died of glioblastoma in New York on December 1, 2018.

== Career ==
Martin studied in Hofstra University and was a four-year letterman on Hofstra's Division I basketball team wearing the 22 jersey and graduated from the university with a bachelor's degree. He continued at Tennessee State University where he additionally coached and graduated with a master's degree.

Martin started his film career as an actor taking roles in a number of films and TV series under the name Frank Martin, notably in Above the Rim where he befriended Tupac Shakur.

Starting 2005, he moved on to writing, producing and directing documentaries. He founded Dutchmen Films, his own production house. The name is a tribute to his alma mater, The Flying Dutchmen.

His debut film as director was Walking on Dead Fish (full title Hurricane Season: Walking on Dead Fish) about the tiny town of LaPlace welcoming New Orleans residents in the wake of Hurricane Katrina and the huge changes when the town's East St. John football coach declared all positions open (even those held by ESJ seniors) which put their scholarship chances, for many, their only chance at a college education, in jeopardy. But rather than fight or turn bitter, these young men banded together in the face of tragedy to create a team.

He followed that up with Long Shot: The Kevin Laue Story, another sports documentary, this time about a one-handed basketball player Kevin Laue who aspired to become a college basketball player.

== Filmography ==
=== Director ===
- 2008: Walking on Dead Fish (Documentary) - also writer
- 2012: Long Shot: The Kevin Laue Story (Documentary) - also writer

=== Producer ===
- 2008: Walking on Dead Fish (Documentary)
- 2012: Long Shot: The Kevin Laue Story (Documentary)
- 2012: Children Rise (Documentary) (post-production)

=== Actor ===
- 1991: HauntedWeen as Farris
- 1994: Above the Rim as Bombers & Birdmen
- 1994: Hard Vice as Dave
- 2001: Peroxide Passion as Mormon Bob
- 2002: Ed (TV Series) as Pat Mahoffey
- 2004: El segundo as Matt
- Also brief roles in Law & Order, All My Children (1996), Guiding Light (2003), Law & Order: Criminal Intent (2004) and Kiss Me Again (2006)
