= Dave Stevens (amputee sportsman) =

American baseball player

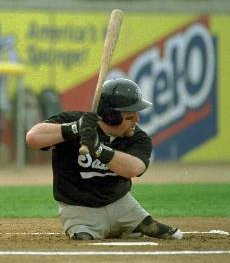
- Stevens with the Saint Paul Saints in 1996
- Born: January 12, 1966
- Occupations: Athlete and sports broadcast professional

Dave Stevens (born January 12, 1966) is an athlete and a 7 time Emmy Award winning sports broadcasting professional. Stevens, a congenital amputee, is the only athlete ever to play college football or minor league baseball without legs. He stands 3-foot 2-inches tall and runs using his hands.

At Wickenburg High School (Wickenburg, Arizona), 1980–1984, Stevens was a three-sport athlete playing football, baseball and wrestling. He set three Arizona state records: most takedowns in wrestling, most career baseball walks, and the season record for walks.

He was a college athlete at Augsburg College where he played varsity football, baseball and wrestled. While at Augsburg College, Stevens also traveled to Ireland, Australia and New Zealand to play football for Team USA. He was also invited to the Olympic Baseball West Regional tryouts in 1983, playing in the outfield with former Major League players Barry Bonds and Oddibe McDowell.

After his college career, Stevens played independent league baseball for the St. Paul Saints in 1996. During his time with the Saints he was proficient at catching fly balls that landed within 25 feet of him. Marty Scott was the Saints manager when Stevens played, "He touched a place in my heart," Scott said. "He's limited physically, but it's not a handicap. I have admiration for what he's accomplished." During his time with the Saints, Stevens also became one of the few players ever to pinch hit for Darryl Strawberry in his professional career. Stevens also started 1 game at 2nd base with the Saints.

In 2012 Wickenburg High School renamed their Most Valuable Player award to the "Dave Stevens Hustle Award" in honor of his amazing career at the High School in the 1980s.

In November 2013, Stevens joined the WWAFT Amputee Football Team as a Quarterback and Defensive Lineman. He continued to tour with the team as they took on NFL alumni and raise awareness for injured military veterans. Stevens played in 19 games with the WWAFT team on the way to a 21–0 record vs NFL Competition.

He has been featured on several TV shows, including CBS Morning News, The Today Show, Good Morning America, This Week in Baseball, Baseball Tonight, Extra, USA Today, Sports Illustrated, Baseball America, The National Enquirer, Star Magazine, People, & ESPN's SportsCenter. He also appears in 2 books about his career "Slouching Toward Fargo" by Neal Karlan and "Baseball Graffiti" by Ed Howsam.

Stevens tried out for the Dallas Cowboys, the Cincinnati Reds and the Minnesota Twins. He has also worked out with the Tampa Rays and Minnesota Twins in Florida, taking batting and fielding practice, as well as throwing out the first pitch in 3 games. Stevens continues to work out with Minor League baseball teams around the country.

Stevens worked as the Assignment Desk Manager at ESPN then as the Coverage and Content editor. He worked at ESPN for 20 years. He has covered 11 Super Bowls, 3 World Series, 3 NCAA Final Fours, and various other historic sports events. He's a father of three boys and is a motivational speaker. Prior to ESPN he worked at KSTP-TV in Minneapolis.

He is currently a reporter for the Disability Channel, along with co-hosting a Celebrity Amputee Golf tournament yearly in the Orlando area.

Stevens is also a professional motivational speaker for the Dave Clark Foundation.

Stevens has also been a member of the Disability Dream & Do Foundation since 2016.

== See also ==
- Jim Abbott, a former Major League Baseball pitcher born with only one hand
- Casey Martin, a disabled golfer
- Oscar Pistorius, a runner with no legs
