= Unstoppable (2024 film) =

2024 film by William Goldenberg

- Release poster
- Directed by: William Goldenberg
- Screenplay by: Eric Champnella; Alex Harris; John Hindman
- Based on: Unstoppable by Anthony Robles; Austin Murphy
- Produced by: Ben Affleck; Elaine Goldsmith-Thomas; Anthony Robles; David Crockett; Andy Fraser; Gary Lewis
- Starring: Jharrel Jerome; Bobby Cannavale; Michael Peña; Don Cheadle; Jennifer Lopez
- Cinematography: Salvatore Totino
- Edited by: Brett M. Reed
- Music by: Alexandre Desplat
- Production companies: Artists Equity; Nuyorican Productions
- Distributed by: Amazon MGM Studios
- Release dates: September 6, 2024 (TIFF); December 6, 2024 (United States)
- Running time: 123 minutes
- Country: United States
- Language: English

Unstoppable is a 2024 American biographical sports drama film about Anthony Robles, a wrestler who was born without a leg and overcomes obstacles to become an NCAA Division I wrestling champion. The film is directed by William Goldenberg and written by Eric Champnella, Alex Harris and John Hindman, based on the 2012 book by Robles and Austin Murphy. The film stars Jharrel Jerome as Robles, and the supporting cast includes Jennifer Lopez, Bobby Cannavale, Michael Peña, and Don Cheadle.

Unstoppable had its premiere in the Special Presentations section at the Toronto International Film Festival on September 6, 2024, followed by a limited theatrical release in the United States on December 6, 2024, by Amazon MGM Studios, and debuted on Prime Video on January 16, 2025.

== Plot ==
Anthony Robles, born without a right leg, grows up in Mesa, Arizona, raised by his mother, Judy Robles. In high school, he discovers a passion for wrestling and joins the school team. Although initially doubted by coaches and teammates, he becomes a formidable competitor.

After high school, Anthony receives a scholarship offer from Drexel University but chooses to attend Arizona State University (ASU) to stay closer to his family. He joins the wrestling team as a walk-on, earning a spot despite initial skepticism from his coaches.

Balancing the physical demands of Division I wrestling and personal struggles at home, Anthony faces numerous obstacles. His stepfather exhibits abusive behavior, adding tension to his family life. However, Anthony draws strength from his mother's unwavering support and belief in his abilities.

At ASU, Anthony trains rigorously and becomes a key member of the wrestling team, earning recognition for his accomplishments. He qualifies for the NCAA Wrestling Championships, where he competes in the 125-pound weight class.

In his senior year, Anthony reaches the 2011 NCAA Wrestling Championships, where he faces a highly skilled, top-seeded opponent from the University of Iowa. In a hard-fought match, he defeats his opponent and secures the national championship title. The film concludes by highlighting Anthony's achievements beyond college. He becomes a motivational speaker and a wrestling coach, using his story to inspire others.

== Cast ==
- Jharrel Jerome as Anthony Robles
- Jennifer Lopez as Judy Robles
- Michael Peña as Bobby Williams
- Don Cheadle as Shawn Charles
- Bobby Cannavale as Rich Robles
- Mykelti Williamson as Eddie
- Shawn Hatosy as Tom Brands
- Parker Sack as Dorian
- Chimechi Oparanozie as Brian Corwin
- Jordan Wallace as Walker
- Benjamin Barrett as Solis
- Corey Jantzen as Markarian
- Shane Sparks as himself

== Production ==
In April 2014, David Crockett and Andy Fraser acquired the rights to produce a film adaptation of Anthony Robles's 2012 autobiography Unstoppable: From Underdog To Undefeated: How I Became A Champion, with Eric Champnella writing the script. In September 2018, Jason Mitchell was cast as Robles.

In November 2019, 101 Studios acquired the rights to the film, with Dwayne Johnson and Dany Garcia set to produce under their Seven Bucks Productions banner. The project was once again announced in March 2023, with William Goldenberg as director in his directorial debut. Goldenberg has collaborated with filmmaker Ben Affleck as a film editor for Gone Baby Gone, Argo, Live by Night, and Air. Affleck and Matt Damon served as producers through the Artists Equity banner. It was also announced that Jennifer Lopez would star in the film, with Jharrel Jerome playing Robles, replacing Mitchell.

Principal photography began in Los Angeles in May 2023, but was halted two weeks later due to the 2023 Writers Guild of America strike. On December 12, 2023, principal photography resumed after the end of the 2023 SAG-AFTRA strike, with Don Cheadle, Michael Peña, and Bobby Cannavale joining the cast. On January 14, 2024, it was announced that principal photography had wrapped. In post-production, Jerome's right leg was digitally removed.

== Release ==
Unstoppable had its premiere as part of the Gala section of the Toronto International Film Festival on September 6, 2024. The film was given a limited theatrical release by Amazon MGM Studios on December 6, 2024. It will be streamed on Prime Video on January 16, 2025. The Los Angeles premiere of the film, originally scheduled for January 7, 2025 at the DGA Theater, was cancelled due to the Palisades Fire.

== Reception ==
=== Box office ===
Unstoppable was released in select theatres prior to streaming on Amazon Prime, grossing $3,966 during its opening weekend in the UK, and ranking 55th at the box office among all films showing at the time.

=== Critical response ===
On the review aggregator website Rotten Tomatoes, 76% of 97 critics' reviews are positive, with an average rating of 6.4/10. The website's consensus reads: "With the magnetic Jharrel Jerome as its champion, Unstoppable is an inspirational sports story that honestly earns audiences' cheers." On Metacritic, which uses a weighted average, the film holds a score of 64 out of 100, based on 23 critics, indicating "generally favorable" reviews.

Jerome and Jennifer Lopez received numerous compliments for their performances, with Lopez being considered for a Best Supporting Actress nomination at the 82nd Golden Globes Awards.

Michael Mann chose Unstoppable as his favorite film of 2024 for a Directors Picks article in Variety.

=== Accolades ===
Award	Date of ceremony	Category	Recipient(s)	Result	Ref.
Toronto International Film Festival	September 8, 2024	Tribute Performer Award	Jharrel Jerome	Won	
Aspen Film Festival	September 17, 2024	Audience Favorite Feature	Unstoppable	Won	
New York Latino Film Festival	September 19, 2024	Impact Award	Jharrel Jerome	Won	
Heartland Film Festival	October 19, 2024	Truly Moving Picture Award	Unstoppable	Won	
Middleburg Film Festival	October 20, 2024	Rising Star Award	Jharrel Jerome	Honored	
Philadelphia Film Festival	October 28, 2024	Student Choice Award	Unstoppable	Won	
Savannah Film Festival	November 2, 2024	Lumiere Award	Jharrel Jerome	Honored	
Winter IndieWire Honors	December 5, 2024	Maverick Award	Jennifer Lopez	Won	
California on Location Awards	December 8, 2024	Location Team of the Year	Unstoppable	Won	
Celebration of Cinema and Television	December 9, 2024	Breakthrough Actor Award	Jharrel Jerome	Won	
Palm Springs Film Festival	January 4, 2025	Legend & Groundbreaker Award	Jennifer Lopez	Won	
Palm Springs Film Festival	January 12, 2025	Young Cineastes Award	Unstoppable	Nominated	
Women Film Critics Circle	January 15, 2025	Adrienne Shelly Award	Unstoppable	Nominated	
BAFTA Awards	February 16, 2025	Rising Star Award	Jharrel Jerome	Nominated	
Black Reel Awards	February 17, 2025	Outstanding Performance	Jharrel Jerome	Nominated	
Imagen Foundation Awards	August 22, 2025	Best Actor	Jharrel Jerome	Nominated	
Imagen Foundation Awards	August 22, 2025	Best Supporting Actress	Jennifer Lopez	Nominated	
