= Jail Time Records =

2026 documentary film

- Directed by: Dione Roach; Steve Happi
- Produced by: Dione Roach; Steve Happi; Giacomo Stucchi-Prinetti; Tabs Breese; Uberto Rapisardi
- Cinematography: Dione Roach; Uberto Rapisardi; Steve Happi
- Edited by: Jocelyne Chaput
- Music by: Steve Happi
- Production companies: Jail Time Production; Artists Equity
- Release date: June 6, 2026 (Tribeca)
- Running time: 94 minutes
- Countries: United States; Cameroon
- Language: French

Jail Time Records is a 2026 documentary film directed and produced by Dione Roach and Steve Happi. It follows the first prison recording studio at New Bell Prison in Cameroon, exploring the stories of three incarcerated artists.

It had its world premiere at the Tribeca Festival on June 6, 2026, where it won Best Documentary Feature, Best Cinematography, and the Albert Maysles Award for Best New Documentary Director.

== Premise ==
Explores the first prison recording studio in Africa, located at New Bell Prison in Cameroon, telling the stories of three incarcerated artists.

== Production ==
The film was produced by Artists Equity, with Rita Ora and Taika Waititi among the executive producers. The film was developed by Dione Roach, Steve Happi and Uberto Rapisardi.

== Release ==
It had its world premiere at the Tribeca Festival on June 6, 2026, where it won Best Documentary Feature, Best Cinematography, and the Albert Maysles Award for Best New Documentary Director. It also screened at the Nashville Film Festival, where it won Best Documentary Feature. Mill Valley Film Festival, and AFI Fest.
