= Dan Adams (American football) =

American football player (born 1984)

No. 46
- Position: Linebacker

Personal information
- Born: October 20, 1984 (age 42); Fairfax, Virginia, U.S.
- Listed height: 5 ft 10 in (1.78 m)
- Listed weight: 215 lb (98 kg)

Career information
- High school: Fairfax (VA) Robinson
- College: Holy Cross (2003–2006)

Awards and highlights
- 2005 national leader in unassisted tackles; New England Golden Helmet Award

Dan Adams
Medal record

Men's American football

Representing United States

World Championship
Gold medal – first place	2007 Japan	Team competition

Dan Adams (born October 20, 1984) is an American former football linebacker. Adams attended the College of the Holy Cross, where he holds the current NCAA record for most unassisted tackles in a game (21) against Colgate University on October 22, 2005. An undersized middle linebacker, Adams led the NCAA in 2005 in unassisted tackles (91) and finished 9th all time in total tackles at College Holy Cross (317).

Following graduation and the end of his collegiate career, Adams represented the US National Team in the 2007 IFAF World Championships in Kawasaki, Japan. Under head coach John Mackovic, the team, composed of 45 collegiate athletes, won gold while appearing on the NFL Network.

== Early life ==
Adams was born in Fairfax, Virginia to Ron and Carol Adams. His father, Ron, played college football at Catawba College and was inducted into the school's hall of fame in 2000.

== College career ==
=== 2003 ===
Adams played in all 12 games as a linebacker and on special teams, making three starts. He led all Crusader freshmen in tackles with 36, including 26 solo stops.

=== 2004 ===
He played in all 11 games on the year, starting four times and ranked second on the team with 57 total tackles, including 43 solo stops. He placed 22nd in the Patriot League in total tackles and posted a season-high 13 tackles against Bucknell.

=== 2005 ===
Adams started all 11 games on the season and was named All-Patriot League by the Sports Xchange. He led the team with 115 total tackles on the year, including 97 solo stops and four tackles for loss. He led the nation in solo tackles, while ranking 21st in total tackles.

=== 2006 ===
Adams led the Holy Cross defense with 109 total tackles on the season, including 91 solo stops, 13 tackles for loss, two sacks, two interceptions, two fumble recoveries and three pass breakups. Adams ranked sixth in the nation in solo tackles, 23rd in total tackles and 47th in tackles for loss. He reached double-figures in tackles seven times on the season, while leading the team in tackles in nine out of 11 games. Over the course of his four-year career as a Crusader, Adams totaled 317 total tackles, 257 solo stops, 19 tackles for loss and 2 INT's.

He was awarded New England Football Writer's Gold Helmet Award, WTAG Defensive Player of The Year, and The Rick Carter Memorial Trophy.

== Television ==
In 2009, Adams competed as a contestant on Season 4 of Pros vs. Joes (All Stars) on SpikeTV against Pacman Jones, Rich Gannon, and Priest Holmes. In the episode entitled, "The Fight", Adams got into an altercation with Pacman Jones following a goal line tackle that forced Jones to fumble.

In 2012, he co-created the ESPY Award winning initiative, Mission Kilimanjaro, that enabled congenital amputee, Kyle Maynard, to crawl to the top of Mt. Kilimanjaro without assistance. Adams served as the expedition co-leader, helping Maynard prepare for the climb while also assisting with fundraising and logistics. The footage captured on the climb aired on ESPN Outside The Lines in 2012.
