= Bova's Bakery =

Bakery in Boston, Massachusetts, U.S.

Coordinates: 42.36520°N 71.05557°W

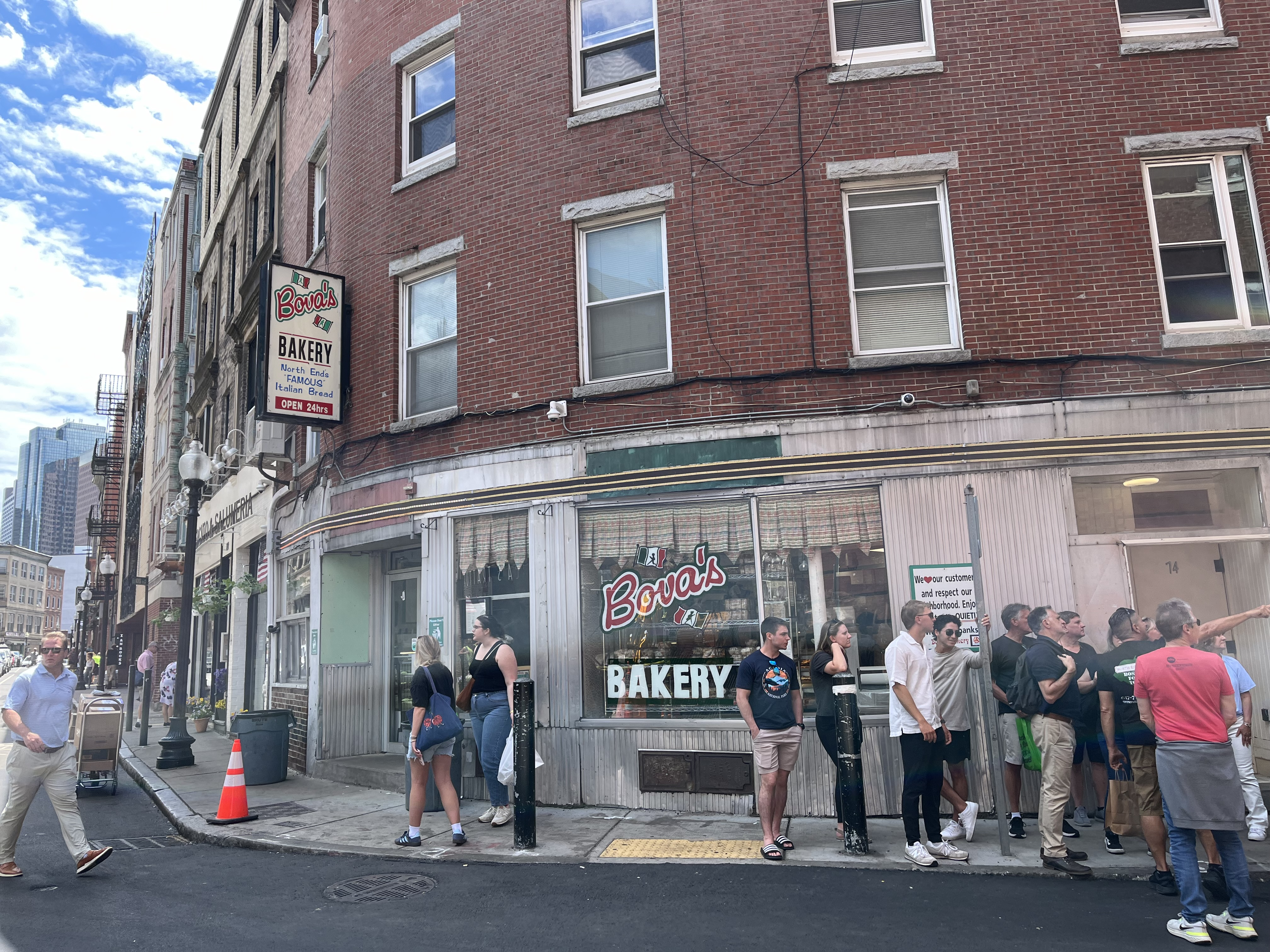
- Interactive map of Bova's Bakery

Restaurant information
- Location: North End, Boston, Massachusetts, 02113, United States

Bova's Bakery is a bakery in the North End of Boston, United States.

== History ==
Founded by Italian immigrant Antonio Bova on Salem Street (but across the street from its current location) in 1926, they specialized only in bread. It eventually added booths, becoming a diner before removing them. By the 1990s, they added more substantial meals like rice balls, pizzas and calzones.

Another source says they opened in 1932.

Antonio's five sons worked in the business with two eventually selling their shares of the business.

== Current operations ==
The bakery is open 24 hours a day.

In March 2023, the bakery closed down for a week to be used as a shooting location for the film The Instigators, starring Matt Damon and Casey Affleck.

Their tiramisu was voted the best in the United States.

An Irish tourist, in 2012, brandished a knife and demanded cannoli.

== See also ==
- List of bakeries
