= Jharrel Jerome =

American actor (born 1997)

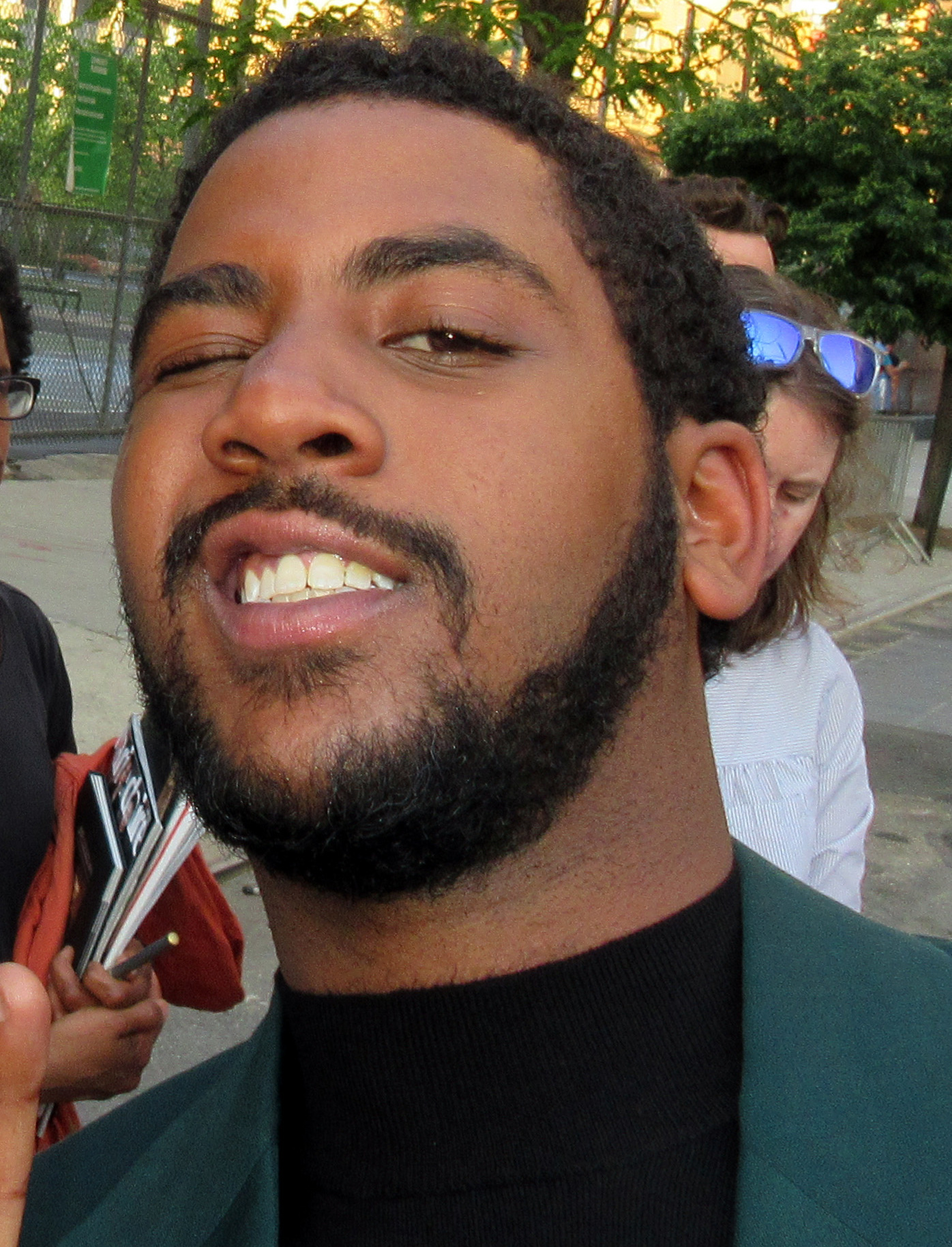
- Jerome in 2019
- Born: October 9, 1997 (age 28); New York City, U.S.
- Occupation: Actor
- Years active: 2016–present

Jharrel Jerome (born October 9, 1997) is an American actor. He made his film debut in Barry Jenkins's drama film Moonlight (2016), and gained prominence for his portrayal of Korey Wise in Ava DuVernay's Netflix miniseries When They See Us (2019), which earned him the Primetime Emmy Award for Outstanding Lead Actor in a Limited Series or Movie. Jerome has since starred as a 13 foot tall boy in Boots Riley's miniseries I'm a Virgo (2023) and as wrestler Anthony Robles in the sports biopic film Unstoppable (2024).

== Early life ==
Jharrel Jerome was born on October 9, 1997 in The Bronx, New York City, and was raised in the neighbourhood. He is of Dominican and Haitian descent. and grew up in a close-knit family with parents whom he described as "loving".

His mother suggested he pursue acting when he was in eighth grade, after which he joined the Riverdale Children's Theatre, a local youth theater organization. He attended and graduated from Fiorello H. LaGuardia High School and commuted to Manhattan each day by train.

== Career ==
=== Acting ===
Shortly after Jerome enrolled as an undergraduate at Ithaca College, he was cast in his first professional acting role in the 2016 independent film Moonlight, as young Kevin. A.O. Scott wrote in The New York Times that he was "excellent" in the role. Director Barry Jenkins said about Jerome, in an interview with the Los Angeles Times, "When you watch Jharrel in that movie, he's not a guy who's been over-rehearsing. That's a dude learning by doing. It's amazing."

Since 2017, Jerome has appeared in the Audience series Mr. Mercedes. He auditioned for the role of young Korey Wise in the 2019 Netflix miniseries When They See Us, based on the Central Park jogger case. After his audition the series' director, Ava DuVernay, asked him to read the lines for adult Korey Wise, and he was subsequently cast in both roles. Jerome grew close to Wise throughout filming, and said in a Los Angeles Times interview, "He's my brother now. I look up to him. I look up to his courage. He's taught me so much on how to be strong." Following his performance in the series, Jharrel became the first Afro-Latino and Dominican to win an acting Emmy.

In 2024, with his film Unstoppable premiering at the 2024 Toronto International Film Festival, he was named a recipient of the Performer Award from the TIFF Tribute Awards.

=== Music ===
On September 24, 2020, Jerome released his debut single "For Real", featuring Bronx rapper Kemba and produced by duo Take a Daytrip. The song was released with a music video directed by Spence Hord. Jerome followed up on August 25, 2022, with "Someone I'm Not", which came with a music video following a day in Jerome's life at home, on a film set, and in a recording studio.

His third single, "Chinatown", was released on May 1, 2023, with a lyric video and the announcement of an upcoming project called Someone I'm Not set for a 2023 release. On August 23, Jerome posted a video on his Instagram of himself which included a snippet of a new song and announced Rap Pack, set for an August 30 release by Sony Music. Rap Pack is the first part of Someone I'm Not, to be released as a four-part series.

Jerome's musical style has been compared to early career Kendrick Lamar.

== Filmography ==
Key
†	Denotes works that have not yet been released

=== Film ===
Year	Title	Role	Notes	Ref.
2016	Her Coloring Book	Artist	Short film	
2016	Wheels	Narrator	Short film	
2016	Moonlight	Teen Kevin		
2018	Monster	Osvaldo Cruz		
2018	First Match	Omari	Credited as Jharrel A. Jerome	
2019	Selah and the Spades	Maxxie		
2019	Robu	Rob	Short film	
2020	Concrete Cowboy	Smush		
2023	Spider-Man: Across the Spider-Verse	Miles G. Morales / Prowler	Voice	
2024	Unstoppable	Anthony Robles		
2027	Spider-Man: Beyond the Spider-Verse †	Miles G. Morales / Prowler	Voice; In production	

=== Television ===
Year	Title	Role	Notes
2017	Tales	Deacon	Episode: "Children's Story"
2017–2019	Mr. Mercedes	Jerome Robinson	Main role
2019	When They See Us	Korey Wise	Lead role; Netflix miniseries
2019	Live in Front of a Studio Audience	Jimmy Pearson	Episode: "All in the Family and Good Times"
2023	I'm a Virgo	Cootie	Lead role; also executive producer
2023	Full Circle	Aked	Miniseries

== Awards and nominations ==
Year	Association	Category	Project	Result	Ref.
2016	Austin Film Critics Association	Honorary Award for Best Ensemble	Moonlight	Won	
2016	Gotham Award	Special Jury Award – Ensemble Performance	Moonlight	Won	
2016	Independent Spirit Award	Robert Altman Award	Moonlight	Won	
2016	MTV Movie Award	Best Kiss	Moonlight	Won	
2016	Screen Actors Guild Award	Outstanding Cast in a Motion Picture	Moonlight	Nominated	
2018	Black Reel Award	Outstanding Actor in a Limited Series	When They See Us	Won	
2018	Critics' Choice Television Award	Best Actor in a Movie/Miniseries	When They See Us	Won	
2018	NAACP Image Award	Outstanding Actor in a Limited-Series or Movie	When They See Us	Won	
2018	Primetime Emmy Awards	Outstanding Lead Actor in a Limited Series or Movie	When They See Us	Won	
2018	Satellite Award	Best Actor - Miniseries or Television Film	When They See Us	Nominated	
2018	Screen Actors Guild Award	Outstanding Actor in a Miniseries or Television Movie	When They See Us	Nominated	
2024	Toronto International Film Festival	Tribute Performer Award	Unstoppable	Won	
2024	New York Latino Film Festival	Impact Award	Unstoppable	Won	
2024	Middleburg Film Festival	Rising Star Award	Unstoppable	Honored	
2024	Savannah Film Festival	Lumiere Award	Unstoppable	Honored	
2024	Celebration of Cinema and Television	Breakthrough Actor Award	Unstoppable	Won	
2025	BAFTA Awards	Rising Star Award	Unstoppable	Nominated	
2025	Black Reel Awards	Outstanding Breakthrough Performance	Unstoppable	Nominated	

== See also ==
- List of Afro-Latinos
