= Congenital amputation =

Human disease

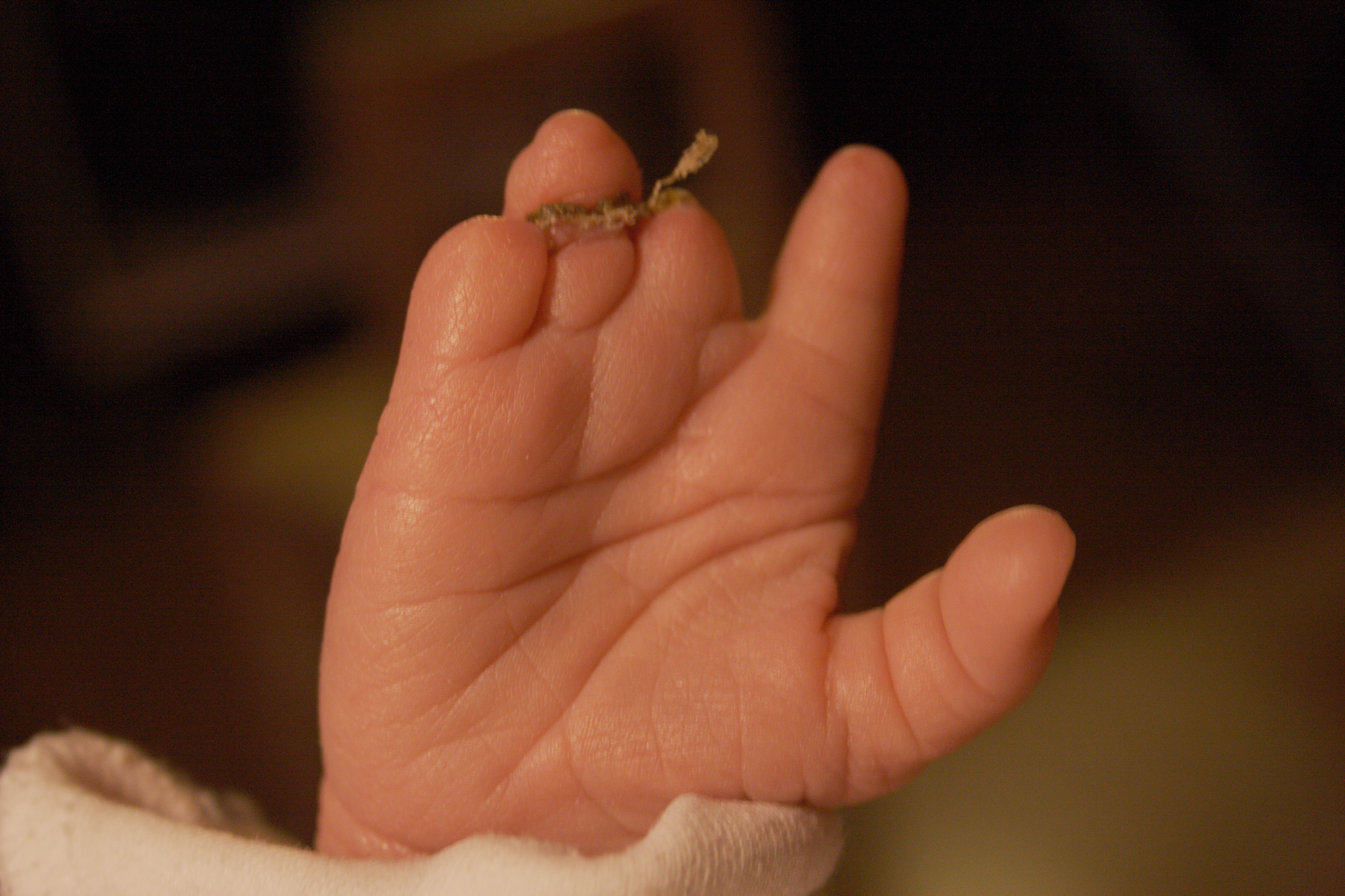
A baby hand affected by amniotic band syndrome

Congenital amputation is birth without a limb or limbs, or without a part of a limb or limbs.

It is known to be caused by blood clots forming in the fetus while in utero (vascular insult) and from amniotic band syndrome: fibrous bands of the amnion that constrict fetal limbs to such an extent that they fail to form or actually fall off due to missing blood supply. Congenital amputation can also occur due to maternal exposure to teratogens during pregnancy.

== Causes ==
The exact cause of congenital amputation is unknown and can result from a number of causes. However, most cases show that the first three months in a pregnancy are when most birth defects occur because that is when the organs of the fetus are beginning to form. One common cause is amniotic band syndrome, which occurs when the inner fetal membrane (amnion) ruptures without injury to the outer membrane (chorion). Fibrous bands from the ruptured amnion float in the amniotic fluid and can get entangled with the fetus, thus reducing blood supply to the developing limbs to such an extent that the limbs can become strangulated; the tissues die and are absorbed into the amniotic fluid. A baby with congenital amputation can be missing a portion of a limb or the entire limb, which results in the complete absence of a limb beyond a certain point where only a stump is left is known as transverse deficiency or amelia. When a specific part is missing, it is referred to as longitudinal deficiency. Finally, phocomelia occurs when only a mid-portion of a limb is missing; for example when the hands or feet are directly attached to the trunk of the body. Amnion ruptures can be caused by:

- teratogenic drugs (e.g. thalidomide, which causes phocomelia), or environmental chemicals
- ionizing radiation (atomic weapons, radioiodine, radiation therapy)
- infections
- metabolic imbalance
- trauma

Congenital amputation is the least common reason for amputation, but a study published in BMC Musculoskeletal Disorders found that 21.1 in 10,000 babies were born with a missing or deformed limb between 1981 and 2010 in the Netherlands, and the CDC estimates that 4 in 10,000 babies are born in the United States with upper limb reductions and 2 in 10,000 with lower limb reductions. During certain periods in history, an increase in congenital amputations has been documented. One example includes the thalidomide tragedy that occurred in the 1960s when pregnant mothers were given a tranquilizer that contained the harmful drug, which produced an increase in children born without limbs.

== Treatment ==
The most popular method of treatment for congenital amputation is having the child be fit for a prosthesis which can lead to normal development, so the muscles don't atrophy. If there is congenital amputation of the fingers, plastic surgery can be performed by using the big toe or second toes in place of the missing fingers of the hand. In rare cases of amniotic banding syndrome, if diagnosed in utero, fetal surgery may be considered to save a limb which is in danger of amputation.

== Notable congenital amputees ==
=== Athletes ===
- Hannah Aspden, American swimmer, born missing her left leg at the hip.
- Stephanie Dixon, Canadian swimmer, born missing her right leg and hip.
- Mitchell Gourley, an Australian Paralympic alpine skier, was born missing his left arm from just below his elbow; he has a few inches of forearm.
- Kevin Laue, a former basketball player, was born missing his left arm just below his elbow.
- Kyle Maynard was born missing both legs above the knee, and both arms above the elbow.
- Nick Newell is a mixed martial artist who was born missing his left arm just below the elbow. He has a short stump of his forearm.
- Anthony Robles, a former wrestler, was born missing his right leg all the way up to his hip.
- Alfonso Cabello, a Spanish para-cyclist, was born with a short tapered stump instead of a full forearm.

=== Other occupations ===
- Jessica Cox is the first licensed armless pilot in aviation history and was born without both arms.
- Felix Klieser is a professional French horn player from Germany, who was born without arms and plays the instrument using a stand and his left foot.

== See also ==
- congenital absence
- Tetra-amelia syndrome
