= The Instigators =

2024 film by Doug Liman

- Theatrical release poster
- Directed by: Doug Liman
- Written by: Chuck Maclean; Casey Affleck
- Produced by: Matt Damon; Ben Affleck; Jeff Robinov; John Graham; Kevin J. Walsh; Alison Winter
- Starring: Matt Damon; Casey Affleck; Hong Chau; Michael Stuhlbarg; Paul Walter Hauser; Ving Rhames; Alfred Molina; Toby Jones; Jack Harlow; Ron Perlman
- Cinematography: Henry Braham
- Edited by: William Goldenberg; Saar Klein; Tatiana S. Riegel
- Music by: Christophe Beck
- Production companies: Artists Equity; Studio 8; The Walsh Company
- Distributed by: Apple Original Films (through Apple TV+)
- Release date: August 2, 2024
- Running time: 101 minutes
- Country: United States
- Language: English
- Box office: $11,106

The Instigators is a 2024 American heist comedy film directed by Doug Liman and written by Chuck Maclean and Casey Affleck. The film stars Affleck and Matt Damon, with a supporting cast that includes Hong Chau, Michael Stuhlbarg, Paul Walter Hauser, Ving Rhames, Alfred Molina, Toby Jones, Jack Harlow, and Ron Perlman.

The Instigators was given a limited theatrical release in the United States on August 2, 2024, before making its streaming debut on Apple TV+ on August 9, 2024. The film received mixed reviews from critics.

== Plot ==
In the upcoming night of Boston's mayoral election, corrupt incumbent Joseph Miccelli is organizing a celebration at the Wharf, expecting a massive influx of cash bribes. Local mobsters Besegai and Dechico plan to steal the money before it is picked up by armored car. They enlist their underling Scalvo, divorced Marine veteran Rory, and alcoholic ex-con Cobby Murphy. Rory is adamant that he receive a share of exactly $32,480 and struggles to explain his motivations to his therapist, Dr. Rivera, while Cobby's bartender Mr. Kelly warns him not to return to his criminal ways.

The three would-be robbers sneak in through the kitchen, expecting to find it empty, but the event is still full of people; challenger Mark Choi has won the election, but Miccelli refuses to concede. The Wharf's safe has already been emptied, so Scalvo robs Miccelli and his inner circle instead, taking Miccelli's bracelet. When the chief of police intervenes, he and Scalvo shoot and kill each other and Cobby is wounded in the shoulder. He and Rory escape in the armored car, which they subsequently abandon after discovering an additional guard in the back of the truck. Laying low at Mr. Kelly's house, Rory and Cobby ask Dechico for help, but he sends thugs Booch and Colani to kill them instead.

With a manhunt for the thieves underway, Miccelli tasks Frank Toomey of the Special Operations Unit to recover the bracelet, which is engraved with the combination to his office safe. Toomey questions Dechico, while Rory confides to Cobby that his share of the money is meant to make amends with his estranged son. Booch and Colani arrive to murder the two thieves, who have cut the house's gas line. Rory and Cobby escape with the bracelet as the house explodes.

Rory brings Cobby to Dr. Rivera, after she agrees to be a willing hostage. They treat Cobby's gunshot wound, but are forced to flee in Rivera's car after she calls the police. Still determined to help Rory, Rivera joins them and they narrowly survive a high-speed police chase. Breaking into Mr. Kelly's empty bar, the three are confronted by Toomey, who leaves with Rivera and the bracelet. Surrounded by police, Cobby cuts the gas line again and escapes with Rory as the bar explodes.

Having memorized the combination, Cobby and Rory go to the mayor's office. Disguised as firefighters, they set off the fire alarms in City Hall and sneak inside, locking themselves in the mayor's office with his counsel, Alan Flynn. Unlocking Miccelli's safe, they discover millions of dollars in illicit cash, while Flynn offers to testify against Miccelli, giving them two hard drives with evidence of the mayor's misdeeds.

The police surround City Hall and open fire, wounding Cobby again in the same shoulder. Sent in to negotiate with the thieves, Rivera exits the building with Flynn, while Rory and Cobby push the safe out of the window, leading the crowd outside to scramble for the cash. In the chaos, Rory and Cobby escape in a fire truck, but are soon confronted by Toomey, driving an assault armored vehicle. They offer him the drives in exchange for letting them go free, but he takes them into custody instead.

Meanwhile, Besegai and Dechico escape to a cabin and attempt to reach the Canadian border on foot, while Miccelli is arrested at Logan International Airport attempting to flee the state in disguise. Choi takes office and is given the drives, which hold account information worth $100 million in untraceable funds. Realizing that he can keep the money for himself as long as they don't indict Cobby and Rory, Choi lets them go, under the auspices of his Second Chance criminal justice reform platform. Rory reconnects with his son at a hockey game, while Cobby visits Rivera at home. In a mid-credits scene, Besegai and Dechico are found frozen to death in the Canadian wilderness.

== Cast ==
- Matt Damon as Rory
- Casey Affleck as Cobby Murphy
- Hong Chau as Dr. Donna Rivera
- Paul Walter Hauser as Booch
- Michael Stuhlbarg as Mr. Besegai
- Ving Rhames as Frank Toomey
- Alfred Molina as Richie Dechico
- Toby Jones as Alan Flynn
- Jack Harlow as Scalvo
- Ron Perlman as Mayor Miccelli
- André De Shields as Mr. Kelly
- Toby Onwumere as John Wayne
- Rob Gronkowski as Himself
- Ronnie Cho as Mark Choi
- Scout Backus as Colani

== Production ==
In December 2022, Apple TV+ acquired the rights to the project, which would see Doug Liman directing and Matt Damon and Casey Affleck starring. Hong Chau joined the cast in February 2023, with other cast members being announced in the following months. Christophe Beck composed the film's score.

The Instigators was produced by Ben Affleck and Damon under their production company Artists Equity, alongside Jeff Robinov, John Graham, Kevin J. Walsh and Alison Winter, for distribution by Apple TV+ under Apple Original Films. According to the film's closing credits, the production benefitted from fiscal incentives established in Spanish Corporate Income Tax Law, with collaboration of Government of Spain; the post-production services were carried out in Madrid.

Principal photography began in Boston, Massachusetts and Long Island, New York in March 2023, with locations including Bova's Bakery in North End and the Nassau University Medical Center in East Meadow.

== Release ==
The Instigators was released in select theaters in the United States on August 2, 2024, before premiering on Apple TV+ on August 9.

== Reception ==
On the review aggregator website Rotten Tomatoes, 40% of 156 critics' reviews are positive, with an average rating of 5.4/10. The website's consensus reads: "The alchemy of Casey Affleck and Matt Damon's knucklehead rapport provides some charm, but this laidback caper unravels due to a lack of intrigue and pulse." Metacritic, which uses a weighted average, assigned the film a score of 48 out of 100, based on 38 critics, indicating "mixed or average" reviews.

== Future ==
In September 2024, Affleck and Damon said they were in early talks with Apple executives to star in a sequel, with Liman possibly returning to direct.
