= Constriction ring syndrome =

- Other names: ADAM complex, amniotic band sequence, amniotic band syndrome, amniotic disruption complex, amniochorionic mesoblastic fibrous strings, congenital amputation, constriction band syndrome, congenital constriction bands, Streeter bands, tissue bands, pseudoainhum
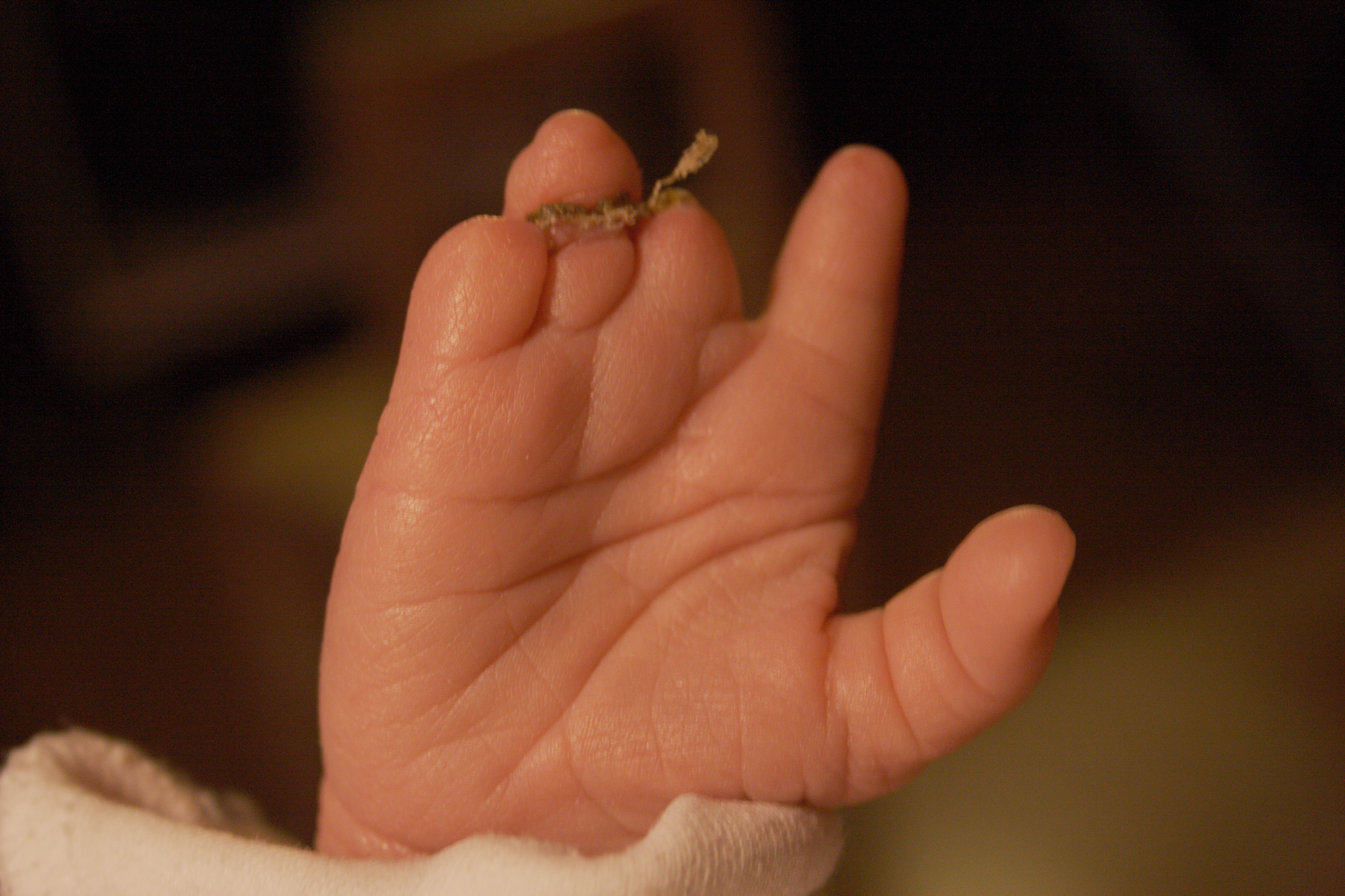
- An infant's hand affected by constriction ring syndrome
- Specialty: Pediatrics

Constriction ring syndrome (CRS) is a congenital disorder with unknown cause. Because of the unknown cause there are many different, and sometimes incorrect, names. It is a malformation due to intrauterine bands or rings that produce deep grooves in (most commonly distal) extremities such as fingers and toes. In rare cases the constriction ring can form around other parts of the fetus and cause amputation or even intrauterine death. The anatomy proximal to the site of constriction (or amputation) is developmentally normal. CRS can be associated with other malformations, with club foot being most common. The precise configuration of the bands, lymphedema, and character of the amputations are not predictable and vary with each individual patient. Also, more than one extremity is usually affected, and it is rare for only one ring to present as an isolated malformation with no other manifestation of this syndrome.

== Signs and symptoms ==
The constriction of appendages by amniotic bands may result in:

1. Constriction rings around the digits, arms, and legs
2. Swelling of the extremities distal to the point of constriction (congenital lymphedema)
3. Amputation of digits, arms, and legs (congenital amputation)

== Cause ==
There are three different theories to the cause of the constriction ring syndrome.

The first is the intrinsic theory, which was proposed by Streeter in 1930. This theory implicates an anomaly in germ plasm resulting in the defects. This theory is reinforced by the clinical presentation of the constriction rings with other internal visceral and systematic anomalies. Because of these other anomalies, the names constriction ring syndrome, constriction band syndrome, and Streeter bands are given to this defect/disease. This is sometimes attributed to vascular disruption shared between cleft palate and other forms of cleft defects occurring together with ABS; this co-occurrence suggests an intrinsic defect of the blood circulation.

The second theory postulates the involvement of an intrauterine disruption during pregnancy followed by a cascade of events involving amniotic rupture. When spontaneous rupture of the amnion occurs early in the second trimester, the separation of amnion from chorion produces many small, thin strands that can become entangled within digits and toes. Later, as the fetus grows but the bands do not, the bands become constricting. This constriction reduces blood circulation, and hence causes congenital abnormalities. In some cases a complete "natural" amputation of one or more digits or limbs may occur before birth or the digits or limbs may be necrotic (dead) and require surgical amputation following birth. The names amniotic band syndrome (ABS), amniotic disruption complex, and amniochorionic mesoblastic fibrous strings are based on this theory.

The third theory postulates the involvement of intrauterine trauma. Intrauterine trauma could be something like amniocentesis, or something like a fetal surgery. An intrauterine trauma could result in hemorrhage leading to acrosyndactyly. One study also showed the presence of bands as confirmed by sonography after fetal surgery.

Because of these different theories, there are many names for this syndrome. For a long time people believed the second theory about the amniotic rupture and strands. In the research cases not every child had a real (amniotic) strand. This could mean that there has to be another explanation for the development of these anomalies.

== Diagnosis ==
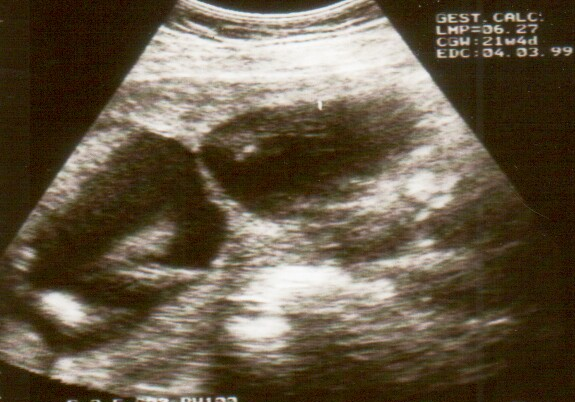

Diagnosis of constriction ring syndrome can be confirmed with an ultrasonography. The clinical manifestations can be extremely variable. It could be a single or multiple manifestation. This can be confirmed at the end of the first trimester or at the beginning of the second trimester. However, not every patient will be diagnosed at that moment; most will be diagnosed at birth.

Individual strands are small and hard to see on ultrasound, so bands are detected indirectly because of the constrictions and swelling upon limbs or digits. Misdiagnosis is also common, so if there are any signs of amniotic bands, further detailed ultrasound tests should be done to assess the severity. 3D ultrasound and MRI can be used for more detailed and accurate diagnosis of bands and the resulting damage/danger to the fetus.

Decreased fetal movement could be a sign of a serious problem which may include ABS. It is rare but possible for the membrane to become wrapped around the placenta or the neck of the baby in the womb causing strangulation and death.

There is a strong relationship between ABS and clubfoot (also called talipes). 31.5% of clubfoot cases can be correlated with ABS, with 20% occurring bilaterally. Other abnormalities found with ABS include: clubhands, cleft lip, and/or cleft palate, and hemangioma.

=== Differential diagnosis ===
The differential diagnosis includes:

- Symbrachydactyly
- Congenital amputations
- Hypoplasias of hand, digit, thumb
- Adams–Oliver syndrome
- ADAM complex

ADAM Complex; CRS is sometimes mislabeled as ADAM complex. ADAM is an abbreviation for amniotic deformity, adhesions mutilations. CRS is the malformation due to a constriction ring around mostly a limb. ADAM complex is the association of limb defects (caused by constriction rings) and certain craniofacial clefts

"Adams–Oliver syndrome is often mislabeled as CRS and consists of cutis aplasia of the scalp in which a longitudinal defect can vary in size and can often be associated with full-thickness skullcap loss. The distal digital or toe hypoplasia-aplasia is often confused with CRS. Constriction rings with or without edema are not present. The digital or toe hypoplasia-aplasia usually contains diminutive nails or nail folds".

=== Classification ===
The constriction ring syndrome is a complex collection of asymmetric congenital anomalies, in which no two cases are exactly alike. This is why a classification is difficult to make.

The most widely used classification system was proposed by Patterson. This classification system is based on the severity of the syndrome and is useful because, the different types require different treatments. Other clinicians have amended this scheme by separating the depth of the ring into mild, moderate, severe, and amputation and by further defining the presence or absence of lymphedema or soft tissue loss distal to the ring. Expanding over subdivision in depth of the clefts for every classification is not necessary because the principles of treatment and technique for correction are the same.

There are four categories:

1. simple constriction rings
2. constriction rings associated with deformity of the distal part with or without lymphedema
3. constriction rings associated with acrosyndactyly
4. uterine amputation

Patterson divided the constriction ring associated with acrosyndactyly into three types:

- Type I: conjoined fingertips with well-formed webs of the proper depth
- Type II: the tips of the digits are joined, but web formation is not complete
- Type III: joined tips, sinus tracts between digits and absent webs

Patterson I

There are simple constriction rings which are strands most commonly around the distal extremities as fingers and toes. In general, the thumb is not likely to be affected by a constriction ring because the fetus typically holds the thumb in tight adduction flexion, making entanglement with strands less likely. These malformations need to be surgically removed which must be executed in different stages and can be done by different techniques (see also treatment).

Patterson II

The CRS involves strands which obstruct the lymphatic vessels and thus causing fluid retention, distal of the affected extremity. This utters itself with swollen parts distal of the constriction.

Patterson III

In this form there is a complex form of syndactyly named acrosyndactyly, the fingers (or toes) were initially separated but due to the constriction they are formed back together. Sometimes multiple fingers can be involved. The distal fusion between digits or toes never initially involves a skeletal coalition. The digits are usually hypoplastic if multiple digits are involved. When the constriction cuts off the blood supply to the fingers, the fingers can form a peak with the most palmar digit being the index finger. Normal neurovascular bundles are not present in the distal parts. Hands with fused fingers need to be released in phases to preserve the distal blood supply.

Paterson IV

One of the most severe consequence of constriction strains is probably intrauterine amputations, this is where the constriction goes as deep as the bone and cuts off the blood supply of the proximal extremity. The result will be that the developing toe or finger will become ischemic and fall off. Because the result is a transverse amputation that cuts off the vascular supply to the developing extremity, the actual constriction ring is not seen. This can result in different outcomes:

- complete resorption; this is the most common form of amputation. In this form the amputated digit is completely resorbed during intrauterine development and therefore the amputated digit can't be found.
- recovery of the digit; the digit is recovered with the placenta during delivery.
- engraftment elsewhere; the amputated digit can be, in rare cases, engrafted somewhere on the fetus.

Intrauterine death

In extremely rare cases a strain can form around the umbilical cord and cut off the blood supply to the fetus which will result in intrauterine death.

Malformation associated with constriction ring syndrome

The percentage of associated anomalies varies from 40% to as high as 80% Constriction ring deformities are as common on the lower extremity as on the upper, almost all of these involve the musculoskeletal system, with clubbed feet being the most common in up to 30% of reported cases. Large reported series reveal an incidence between 5% and 15% of craniofacial malformations with clefting of the lip or palate.

== Prevention ==
Amniotic band syndrome is considered an accidental event and it does not appear to be genetic or hereditary, so the likelihood of it occurring in another pregnancy is remote. The cause of amnion tearing is unknown and as such there are no known preventative measures.

== Treatment ==
Surgical correction is recommended when a constriction ring results in a limb contour deformity, with or without lymphedema.

=== Surgical technique ===
At the beginning of the surgery a tourniquet will be applied to the limb. A tourniquet compresses and controls local arterial and venous circulation for about two hours. The constriction band must be dissected very carefully to avoid damaging the underlying neurovasculature. When the constriction band is excised, there will be a direct closure. This allows the fatty tissue to naturally reposition itself under the skin.

"With complete circumferential constriction bands, it is recommended that a two-stage correction approach be used. At the first operation, one-half of the circumference is excised and the other one-half can be excised after three to six months. This will avoid any problems to the distal circulation in the limb, which may already be compromised. Lymphedema, when present, will significantly improve within a few weeks of the first surgery."

For the direct closure of the defect after dissecting a constriction band there are two techniques:

1. Triangular flaps: for this technique, the circumference between the two borders must be measured. Depending on the difference, the number of triangular flaps can be decided. With a triangular flap, more skin can be created.
2. Z-plasty or W-plasty: "Z-plasty is a plastic surgery technique that is used to improve the functional and cosmetic appearance of scars. It can elongate a contracted scar or rotate the scar tension line. The middle line of the Z-shaped incision (the central element) is made along the line of greatest tension or contraction, and triangular flaps are raised on opposite sides of the two ends and then transposed."

In rare cases, if diagnosed in utero, fetal surgery may be considered to save a limb that is in danger of amputation or other deformity. This operation has been successfully performed on fetuses as young as 22 weeks. Monash Medical Centre in Melbourne, Australia, as well as multiple facilities in the United States, have performed successful amniotic band release surgery.

=== Reconstructions and prosthetics ===
Treatment usually occurs after birth and where plastic and reconstructive surgery is considered to treat the resulting deformity. Plastic surgery ranges from simple to complex depending on the extent of the deformity. Physical and occupational therapy may be needed long-term.

Prosthetics may help some people with ABS to live more functional lives. The price and complexity of these prosthetics vary dramatically, but advances in 3D printing have helped to increase the availability of artificial fingers while reducing their cost of production.

== Prognosis ==
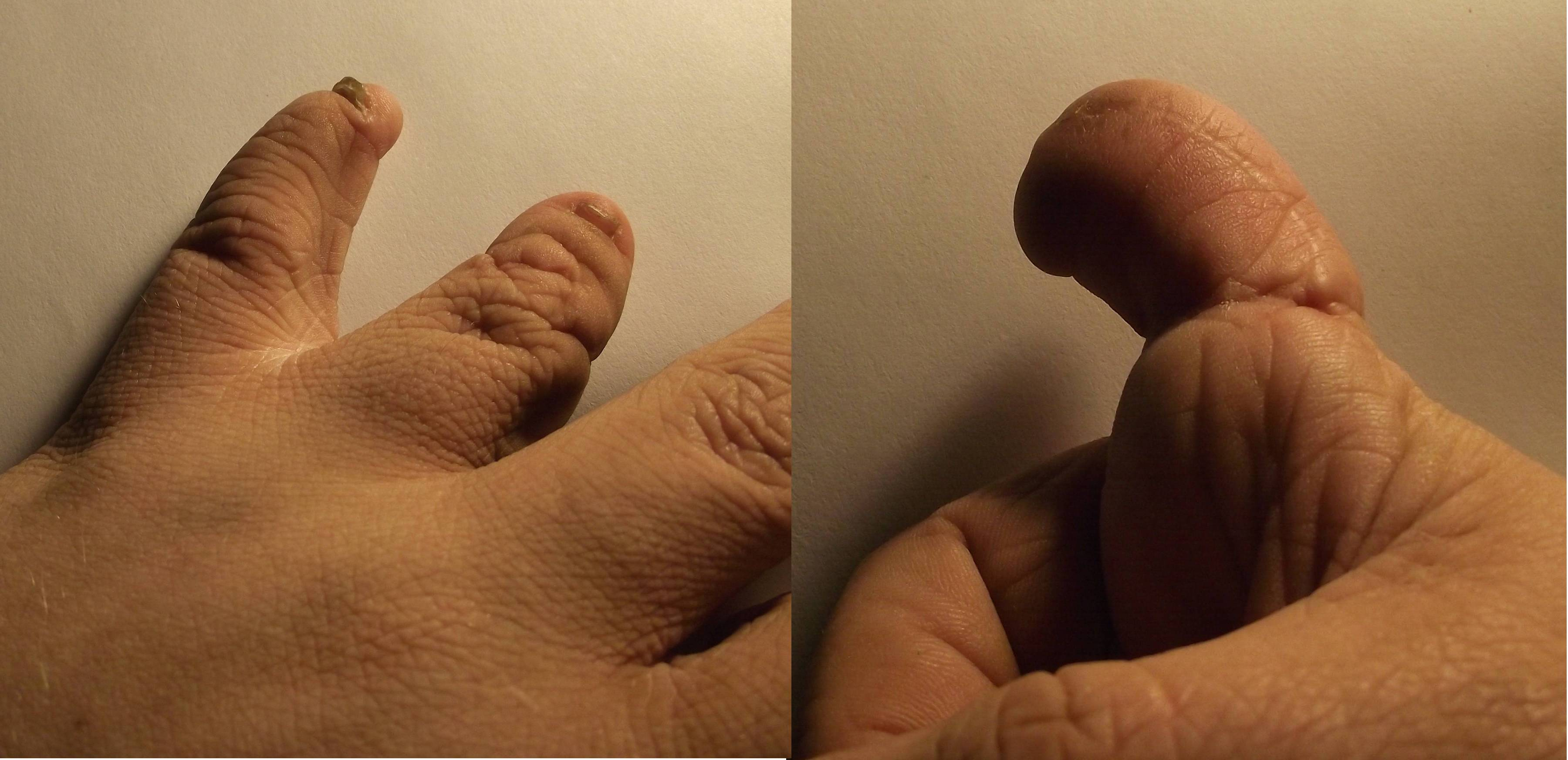
Amniotic band syndrome of the hand in a 26-year-old male

The prognosis depends on the location and severity of the constricting bands. Every case is different and multiple bands may be entangled around the fetus.

Bands which wrap around fingers and toes can result in syndactyly or amputations of the digits. In other instances, bands can wrap around limbs causing restriction of movement resulting in clubbed feet. In more severe cases, the bands can constrict the limb causing decreased blood supply and amputation. Amniotic bands can also sometimes attach to the face or neck causing deformities such as cleft lip and palate. If the bands become wrapped around the head or umbilical cord it can be life-threatening for the fetus.

The number of cases of miscarriage that can be attributed to ABS is unknown, although it has been reported that it may be the cause of 178 in 10,000 miscarriages. Up to 50% of cases have other congenital anomalies including cleft lip, cleft palate, and clubfoot deformity. Hand and finger anomalies occur in up to 80%.

== Epidemiology ==
The reported incidence of constriction ring syndrome varies from 1/1200 and 1/15,000 live births. The prevalence is equal in male and female.

Fetomaternal factors like prematurity, maternal illness, low birth weight, and maternal drug exposure are predisposing factors for the constriction ring syndrome.

No positive relationship between CRS and genetic inheritance has been reported.

== Society ==
Notable people living with ABS include:

- Sophie Wells, British member Paralympics dressage team
- Gina Casillas, US volleyball player
- Ian T. Jamison, US artist
- Anna Johannes, US Paralympic swimmer
- Jean-Jacques Machado, 7th degree red-and-black belt in Brazilian Jiu-Jitsu
- Monica Price, a case study of a young woman born with amniotic band syndrome
- Kingsley McGowan, US Men's Rugby Player
- Troy Fumagalli, University of Wisconsin football player (2017 Cotton Bowl Offensive MVP)
- Lyric Mariah Heard US model
- Shaquem Griffin, Miami Dolphins Football Player (2016 AAC Defensive Player of the Year)
- Jennifer Bricker, acrobat and aerialist
- Sarah Herron, The Bachelor season 17 contestant, Bachelor in Paradise seasons 1 and 3 contestant, founder of She Lift for girls with disabilities.
- Victoria Canal, Spanish-American singer and songwriter
- Albert Kunickis III, US American Football player
- Logan Marmino, Actor and advocate

== See also ==
- List of skin conditions
- Ainhum, auto-amputation of the fifth toe in adults
