= Kevin Atlas =

American basketball player (born 1990)

Personal information
- Born: April 13, 1990 (age 36) San Jose, California, U.S.
- Listed height: 6 ft 11 in (2.11 m)
- Listed weight: 230 lb (104 kg)

Career information
- High school: Amador Valley (Pleasanton, California); Fork Union Military Academy (Fork Union, Virginia)
- College: Manhattan (2009–2012)
- NBA draft: 2012: undrafted
- Position: Center

Career highlights
- First Division I basketball player with one hand on scholarship

Kevin Atlas (formerly Kevin Clinton Laue; born April 13, 1990) is an American former college student and basketball player at Manhattan College. He is 6 feet 11 inches (2.11 m) tall. He was born missing half of one arm and has been recognized for his skills and success in overcoming adversity. In the 2008–2009 season he played at a military academy in Virginia and was a prospect for collegiate play. In March 2009 he received a scholarship to play Division I basketball for Manhattan College. A documentary film titled Long Shot: The Kevin Laue Story was released in 2012. Atlas works as a speaker, and authored a book entitled Get in the Game.

== Biography ==
Due to a restriction of prenatal blood circulation, Atlas was born with a left arm that ended just below his elbow; he has a short rounded stump of his forearm. His parents encouraged him to play soccer as a child, but he did not like the sport. He also refused to use a prosthetic arm. By eighth grade he had grown enough that he could handle a ball with one hand and could dunk.

== Competitive playing career ==
=== High school ===
Atlas attended Amador Valley High School near his home where as a junior he played center on the varsity basketball team. He played about 23 minutes a game and averaged eight points, six blocks and eight rebounds per game.

During his junior year, he was described as the team's star. In 2007 Sports Illustrated called him "the most exciting player in basketball" in recognition of his playing prowess with just one hand, but he missed most of his senior year due to a broken leg, (Averaging eleven points, ten blocks, and nine rebounds per game his final year).

After graduation, he enrolled as a postgraduate at Fork Union Military Academy in Virginia for the 2008–2009 school year. As of December 2008, his season statistics at Fork Union were 6.9 points and 7.4 rebounds per game. As an NCAA prospect, he received recruiting letters from Division III schools, but hoped to be able to play for a Division I team. Scouts, Inc. describes him as a "prospect that could instantly help a number of low-major Division I programs," noting his "quick leaping ability" and effective play on both offense and defense. In March 2009 he was awarded a scholarship from Manhattan College, a Division I school.

Kevin wears size 17 shoes and can handle the ball in his large right hand, which an Amador Valley teammate said "is as big as two normal hands." He uses his short forearm stump (which he calls his 'nub') to help grip the ball after catching a pass. He also uses his stump effectively in defense, despite its short length, using its surprising strength to block opposing players.

=== College ===
Atlas played his first two seasons with Manhattan College under coach Barry Rohrssen. For his junior season, he played under coach Steve Masiello. As a freshman in the 2009–10 season, Atlas played in 19 games with an average 2.7 minutes per game and 0.7 rebounds and 0.2 blocks. On December 30, 2009, Atlas scored his first career point with a free throw and grabbed a season-high eight rebounds in 17 minutes in Manhattan's 86–48 loss to Vanderbilt. Atlas subsequently scored on field goals in two other games.

In 2010–11, his sophomore year, Atlas played in 22 games and started three games. On December 11 against Binghamton, Atlas played 14 minutes and scored 6 points on 3-for-4 shooting. In that game, Atlas also made 3 rebounds and 2 blocks. On December 22 against Bowling Green, Atlas played 13 minutes, scored 4 points off field goals, and made 5 rebounds. Cumulatively, Atlas made 21 rebounds and 5 blocks this season. In his junior year, 2011–12, Atlas grabbed 9 rebounds and blocked 7 shots. Manhattan qualified for the 2012 CollegeInsider.com Postseason Tournament, but Atlas did not play in the tournament.

After graduating from Manhattan College in only three years, Atlas's career totals came to 36 points, 42 rebounds, 15 blocks, 1 steal, and 1 assist.

== Career statistics ==
Legend
GP	Games played	GS	Games started	MPG	Minutes per game
FG%	Field goal percentage	3P%	3-point field goal percentage	FT%	Free throw percentage
RPG	Rebounds per game	APG	Assists per game	SPG	Steals per game
BPG	Blocks per game	PPG	Points per game	**Bold**	Career high

=== College ===
Year	Team	GP	GS	MPG	FG%	3P%	FT%	RPG	APG	SPG	BPG	PPG
2009–10	Manhattan	19	0	2.6	.375	–	.143	.6	.0	.0	.2	.4
2010–11	Manhattan	**22**	**3**	**5.0**	.600	–	–	**1.0**	.0	.0	.2	**1.1**
2011–12	Manhattan	19	0	3.3	**1.000**	–	**.500**	.5	**.1**	**.1**	**.4**	.3
Career		60	3	3.7	.567	–	.222	.7	.0	.0	.3	.6
