= PostTrak =

Movie audience opinion survey

- Company type: Film surveys
- Founded: 2013
- Headquarters: United States
- Areas served: United States, Canada
- Key people: Kevin Goetz
- Parent: Comscore
- Website: comscore.com

PostTrak is a U.S.-based service that surveys film audiences for film studios.

== History ==
The service conducts surveys in the top 20 markets in the U.S. and Canada with the use of polling cards and electronic kiosks. A PostTrak report for a film aggregates the demographic make-up, opinions about the film, impression of the film's marketing, when tickets were purchased, and plans to buy or rent the film on home media.

The service was designed by Kevin Goetz, the founder and CEO of Screen Engine/ASI. The service was launched in 2013 by Screen Engine and Rentrak; the latter provides box office data to studios. PostTrak focuses on wide releases and polls audiences across 20 markets in the United States and Canada, where past services focused on three or four markets. Most of the six major studios have subscribed to the service, as well as several distributors. The Hollywood Reporter wrote in 2013 that the polling firm CinemaScore had monopolized the film industry for three decades but received criticism for "relying on outdated polling techniques and too limited a sample" and would be challenged by PostTrak. While CinemaScore polls on a scale of A+ to F, PostTrak assigns a positive score percentage on a 1–100 scale, among other reactions, such as how likely an audience member would be to recommend the film to a friend.

== Acquisitions ==
With Comscore's 2016 acquisition of Rentrak, the service is owned by comScore and Screen Engine.
