= List of awards and nominations received by Matt Damon =

Matt Damon awards and nominations
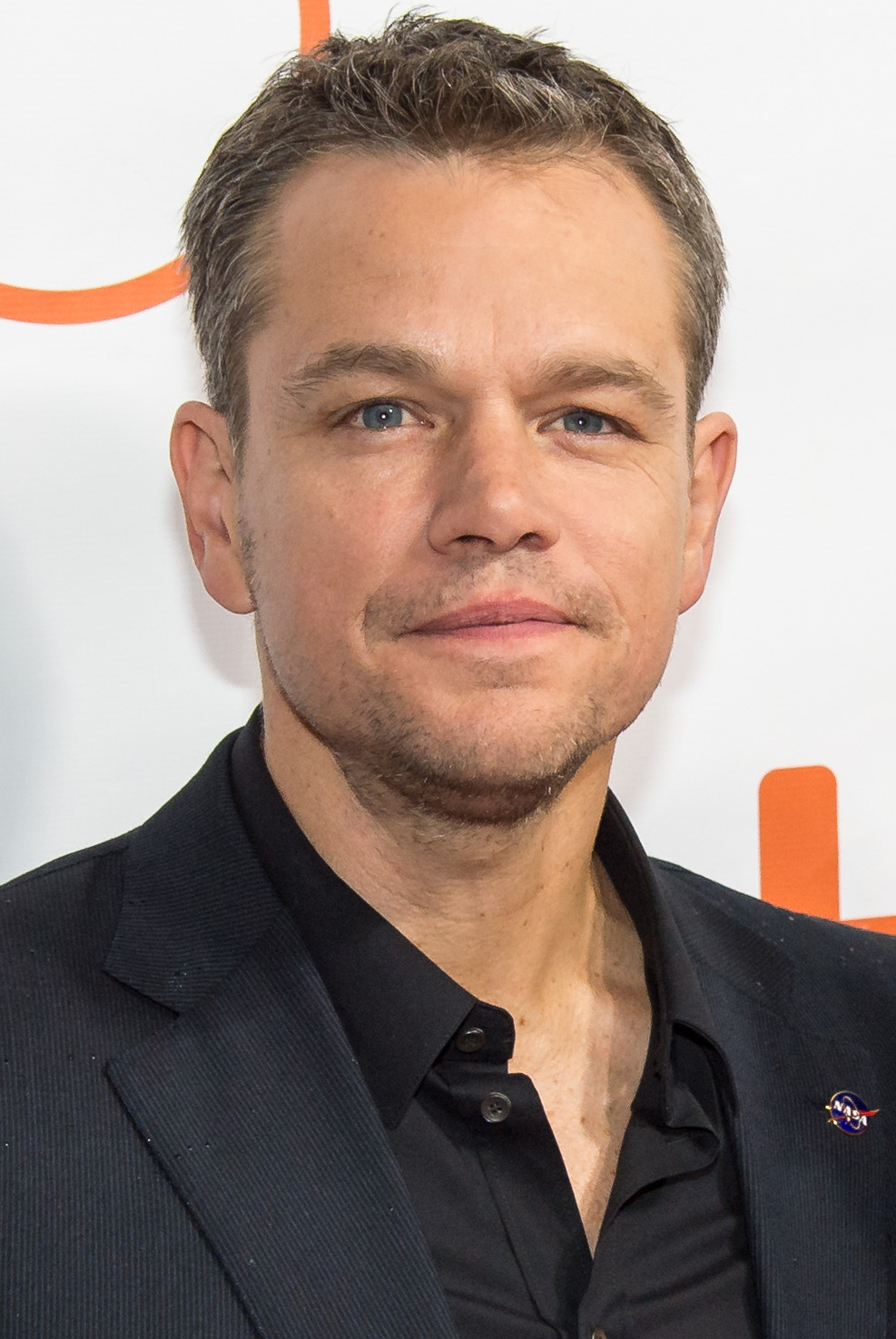
- Damon at the 2015 Toronto International Film Festival
Awards and nominations
Award	Wins	Nominations
Academy Awards	1	5
Actor Awards	1	7
BAFTA Awards	0	3
Critics' Choice Awards	3	11
Emmy Awards	0	7
Golden Globe Awards	2	9
Producers Guild of America Awards	0	2
Writers Guild of America Awards	0	1

Totals (Note: Certain award groups do not simply award one winner. They acknowledge several different recipients, have runners-up, and have third place. Since this is a specific recognition and is different from losing an award, runner-up mentions are considered wins in this award tally. For simplification and to avoid errors, each award in this list has been presumed to have had a prior nomination.)
- Wins: 28
- Nominations: 96

The following article is a List of awards and nominations received by Matt Damon.

Matt Damon is an American actor, producer, and screenwriter. He has received several awards including an Academy Award, two Golden Globe Awards and a Screen Actors Guild Award as well as nominations for three BAFTA Awards and seven Primetime Emmy Awards.

Damon and Ben Affleck co-wrote Good Will Hunting (1997), a screenplay about a young math genius, which received nine Academy Awards nominations, earning Damon and Affleck Oscars and Golden Globes for Best Screenplay. Damon was also nominated for an Academy Award for Best Actor for the same film. Since then he has received dozens of nominations and awards for his work as an actor, screenwriter, and producer including the Golden Globe Award for Best Actor – Motion Picture Musical or Comedy for his role in The Martian (2015).

Since Good Will Hunting Damon has received three Academy Award nominations. For his performance as Francois Pienaar in Clint Eastwood's sports drama Invictus he received an Academy Award for Best Supporting Actor nomination. For his role as the botanist and mechanical engineer Mark Watney in Ridley Scott's science fiction film The Martian (2015) he received his second Academy Award for Best Actor nomination. In 2017 he received the Academy Award for Best Picture nomination for the Kenneth Lonergan drama Manchester by the Sea (2016).

== Major associations ==
=== Academy Awards ===
Year	Category	Nominated work	Result	Ref.
1998	Best Actor	Good Will Hunting	Nominated	
1998	Best Original Screenplay	Good Will Hunting	Won (Note: Shared with Ben Affleck)	
2010	Best Supporting Actor	Invictus	Nominated	
2016	Best Actor	The Martian	Nominated	
2017	Best Picture	Manchester by the Sea	Nominated (Note: As Producer)	

=== Actor Awards ===
Year	Category	Nominated work	Result	Ref.
1998	Outstanding Male Actor in a Leading Role	Good Will Hunting	Nominated	
1998	Outstanding Cast in a Motion Picture	Good Will Hunting	Nominated	
1999	Outstanding Cast in a Motion Picture	Saving Private Ryan	Nominated	
2007	Outstanding Cast in a Motion Picture	The Departed	Nominated	
2010	Outstanding Male Actor in a Supporting Role	Invictus	Nominated	
2014	Outstanding Male Actor in a Miniseries or Movie	Behind the Candelabra	Nominated	
2024	Outstanding Cast in a Motion Picture	Oppenheimer	Won	

=== BAFTA Awards ===
Year	Category	Nominated work	Result	Ref.
British Academy Film Awards
2014	Best Actor in a Supporting Role	Behind the Candelabra	Nominated	
2016	Best Actor in a Leading Role	The Martian	Nominated	
2017	Best Film	Manchester by the Sea	Nominated	

=== Critics' Choice Awards ===
Year	Category	Nominated work	Result	Ref.
Critics' Choice Movie Awards
1998	Best Breakout Artist	Good Will Hunting	Won	
1998	Best Original Screenplay	Good Will Hunting	Won	
2005	Best Acting Ensemble	Ocean's Twelve	Nominated	
2007	Best Acting Ensemble	The Departed	Nominated	
2010	Best Supporting Actor	Invictus	Nominated	
2016	Best Actor	The Martian	Nominated	
2016	Best Picture	Manchester by the Sea	Nominated	
2016	Best Actor in an Action Movie	Jason Bourne	Nominated	
2024	Best Acting Ensemble	Oppenheimer	Won	
Critics' Choice Television Awards
2013	Best Actor in a Movie/Miniseries	Behind the Candelabra	Nominated	
Critics' Choice Super Awards
2026	Best Actor in an Action Movie	The Rip	Nominated	

=== Emmy Awards ===
Year	Category	Nominated work	Result	Ref.
Primetime Emmy Awards
2002	Outstanding Reality Program	Project Greenlight	Nominated	
2004	Outstanding Reality Program	Project Greenlight 2	Nominated	
2005	Outstanding Reality Program	Project Greenlight 3	Nominated	
2011	Outstanding Guest Actor in a Comedy Series	30 Rock (episode: "Double-Edged Sword")	Nominated	
2013	Outstanding Lead Actor in a Miniseries or Movie	Behind the Candelabra	Nominated	
2016	Outstanding Reality Program	Project Greenlight 4	Nominated	
2019	Outstanding Guest Actor in a Comedy Series	Saturday Night Live	Nominated	

=== Golden Globe Awards ===
Year	Category	Nominated work	Result	Ref.
1998	Best Screenplay – Motion Picture	Good Will Hunting	Won	
1998	Best Actor in a Motion Picture - Drama	Good Will Hunting	Nominated	
2000	Best Actor in a Motion Picture - Drama	The Talented Mr. Ripley	Nominated	
2010	Best Actor in a Motion Picture - Musical or Comedy	The Informant!	Nominated	
2010	Best Supporting Actor – Motion Picture	Invictus	Nominated	
2014	Best Actor – Miniseries or Television Film	Behind the Candelabra	Nominated	
2016	Best Actor in a Motion Picture - Musical or Comedy	The Martian	Won	
2024	Best Actor in a Motion Picture - Musical or Comedy	Air	Nominated	

=== Producers Guild of America Awards ===
Year	Category	Nominated work	Result	Ref.
2003	Best Non-Fiction Television	Project Greenlight	Nominated	
2004	Best Non-Fiction Television	Project Greenlight 2	Nominated	
2017	Best Theatrical Motion Picture	Manchester by the Sea	Nominated	

=== Writers Guild of America Awards ===
Year	Category	Nominated work	Result	Ref.
1998	Best Original Screenplay	Good Will Hunting	Nominated	

== Critics awards ==
Organizations	Year	Category	Work	Result	Ref.
Boston Society of Film Critics	1997	Best Screenplay	Good Will Hunting	3rd place	
Boston Society of Film Critics	2006	Best Cast	The Departed	Nominated	
Chicago Film Critics Association	1997	Most Promising Actor	Good Will Hunting	Won	
Chicago Film Critics Association	2009	Best Actor	The Informant!	Nominated	
Florida Film Critics Circle	1997	Newcomer of the Year	Good Will Hunting	Won	
Hollywood Critics Association	2023	Best Actor	Air	Won	
Las Vegas Film Critics Society	1997	Most Promising Actor	The Rainmaker	Won	
Las Vegas Film Critics Society	1997	Most Promising Actor	Good Will Hunting	Won	
Las Vegas Film Critics Society	1999	Best Actor	The Talented Mr. Ripley	Nominated	
Las Vegas Film Critics Society	2000	Best Actor	All the Pretty Horses	Nominated	
London Film Critics' Circle	1998	Actor of the Year	The Rainmaker / Good Will Hunting / The Talented Mr. Ripley	Nominated	
London Film Critics' Circle	1999	Screenwriter of the Year	Good Will Hunting	Nominated	
National Board of Review	1998	Special Achievement in Filmmaking	Good Will Hunting	Won	
National Board of Review	2007	Best Cast	The Departed	Won	
National Board of Review	2015	Best Actor	The Martian	Won	
Online Film Critics Society	1998	Best Screenplay	Good Will Hunting	Nominated	
Online Film Critics Society	1998	Best Cast	Saving Private Ryan	Won	
Online Film Critics Society	2015	Best Actor	The Martian	Nominated	
Phoenix Film Critics Society	2001	Best Cast	Ocean's Eleven	Nominated	
Phoenix Film Critics Society	2010	Best Supporting Actor	True Grit	Nominated	
San Diego Film Critics Society	2009	Best Actor	The Informant!	Nominated	

== Miscellaneous awards ==
Organizations	Year	Category	Work	Result	Ref.
Alliance of Women Film Journalists	2010	Best Supporting Actor	True Grit	Nominated	
Alliance of Women Film Journalists	2015	Best Actor	The Martian	Nominated	
Audie Awards	2010	Audiobook of the Year	Nelson Mandela's Favorite African Folktales	Won	
Audie Awards	2010	Multi-Voiced Performance	Nelson Mandela's Favorite African Folktales	Won	
AACTA Awards	2016	Best Actor	The Martian	Nominated	
Awards Circuit Community Awards	1997	Best Actor	Good Will Hunting	Nominated	
Awards Circuit Community Awards	1997	Best Original Screenplay	Good Will Hunting	Won	
Awards Circuit Community Awards	2006	Best Cast Ensemble	The Departed	Nominated	
Awards Circuit Community Awards	2015	Best Actor	The Martian	Nominated	
Berlin International Film Festival	1998	Outstanding Single Achievement	Good Will Hunting	Won	
Berlin International Film Festival	2007	Outstanding Artistic Contribution – Ensemble Cast	The Good Shepherd	Won	
Blockbuster Entertainment Awards	1998	Favorite Actor – Drama	The Rainmaker	Nominated	
Blockbuster Entertainment Awards	1999	Favorite Actor – Video	Good Will Hunting	Won	
Blockbuster Entertainment Awards	2000	Favorite Actor – Suspense	The Talented Mr. Ripley	Nominated	
Blockbuster Entertainment Awards	2000	Favorite Actor – Drama/Romance	All the Pretty Horses	Nominated	
Capri Hollywood International Film Festival	2023	Best Ensemble Cast	Oppenheimer	Won	
Empire Awards	2005	Best Actor	The Bourne Supremacy	Won	
Empire Awards	2008	Best Actor	The Bourne Ultimatum	Nominated	
Empire Awards	2016	Best Actor	The Martian	Won	
Humanitas Prize	1997	Feature Film Category	Good Will Hunting	Won	
MTV Movie Awards	1998	Best Male Performance	Good Will Hunting	Nominated	
MTV Movie Awards	1998	Best On-Screen Duo	Good Will Hunting	Nominated	
MTV Movie Awards	1998	Best Kiss	Good Will Hunting	Nominated (Note: Shared with Minnie Driver)	
MTV Movie Awards	1999	Best Villain	The Talented Mr. Ripley	Nominated	
MTV Movie Awards	1999	Best Musical Performance	The Talented Mr. Ripley	Nominated	
MTV Movie Awards	2002	Best On-Screen Duo	Ocean's Eleven	Nominated	
MTV Movie Awards	2005	Best Male Performance	The Bourne Supremacy	Nominated	
MTV Movie Awards	2008	Best Fight	The Bourne Ultimatum	Nominated	
MTV Movie Awards	2008	Best Male Performance	The Bourne Ultimatum	Nominated	
MTV Movie Awards	2016	Best Male Performance	The Martian	Nominated	
People's Choice Awards	2005	Favorite Male Action Movie Star	The Bourne Supremacy	Nominated	
People's Choice Awards	2007	Favorite On-Screen Match-Up	The Departed	Nominated (Note: Shared with Leonardo DiCaprio & Jack Nicholson)	
People's Choice Awards	2007	Favorite Leading Man	The Departed	Nominated	
People's Choice Awards	2008	Favorite Male Action Star	The Bourne Ultimatum	Won	
People's Choice Awards	2015	Favorite Dramatic Movie Actor	The Monuments Men	Nominated	
People's Choice Awards	2016	Favorite Dramatic Movie Actor	The Martian	Nominated	
Satellite Awards	1998	Best Original Screenplay	Good Will Hunting	Won	
Satellite Awards	1998	Best Actor – Motion Picture Drama	Good Will Hunting	Nominated	
Satellite Awards	2006	Best Cast – Motion Picture	The Departed	Won	
Satellite Awards	2009	Best Actor – Motion Picture Musical or Comedy	The Informant!	Nominated	
Satellite Awards	2014	Best Actor – Miniseries or Television Film	Behind the Candelabra	Nominated	
Satellite Awards	2016	Best Actor – Motion Picture	The Martian	Nominated	
Saturn Award	2005	Best Actor	The Bourne Supremacy	Nominated	
Saturn Award	2016	Best Actor	The Martian	Nominated	
ShoWest Convention, USA	1998	Male Star of Tomorrow	Himself	Won	
ShoWest Convention, USA	2005	Male Star of the Year	Himself	Won	
Spike Guys' Choice Awards	2008	Ass-Kicker Award	Himself	Won	
Teen Choice Awards	1999	Choice Movie: Actor	Rounders	Nominated	
Teen Choice Awards	2000	Choice Movie: Actor	The Talented Mr. Ripley	Nominated	
Teen Choice Awards	2000	Choice Movie: Liar	The Talented Mr. Ripley	Nominated	
Teen Choice Awards	2005	Choice Movie Actor: Action/Thriller	The Bourne Supremacy	Nominated	
Teen Choice Awards	2007	Choice Movie: Chemistry	Ocean's Thirteen	Nominated	
Teen Choice Awards	2012	Choice Movie Actor: Drama	We Bought a Zoo	Nominated	
Western Heritage Awards	2003	Theatrical Motion Picture	Spirit: Stallion of the Cimarron	Won	
Western Heritage Awards	2011	Theatrical Motion Picture	True Grit	Won	

== Honorary awards ==
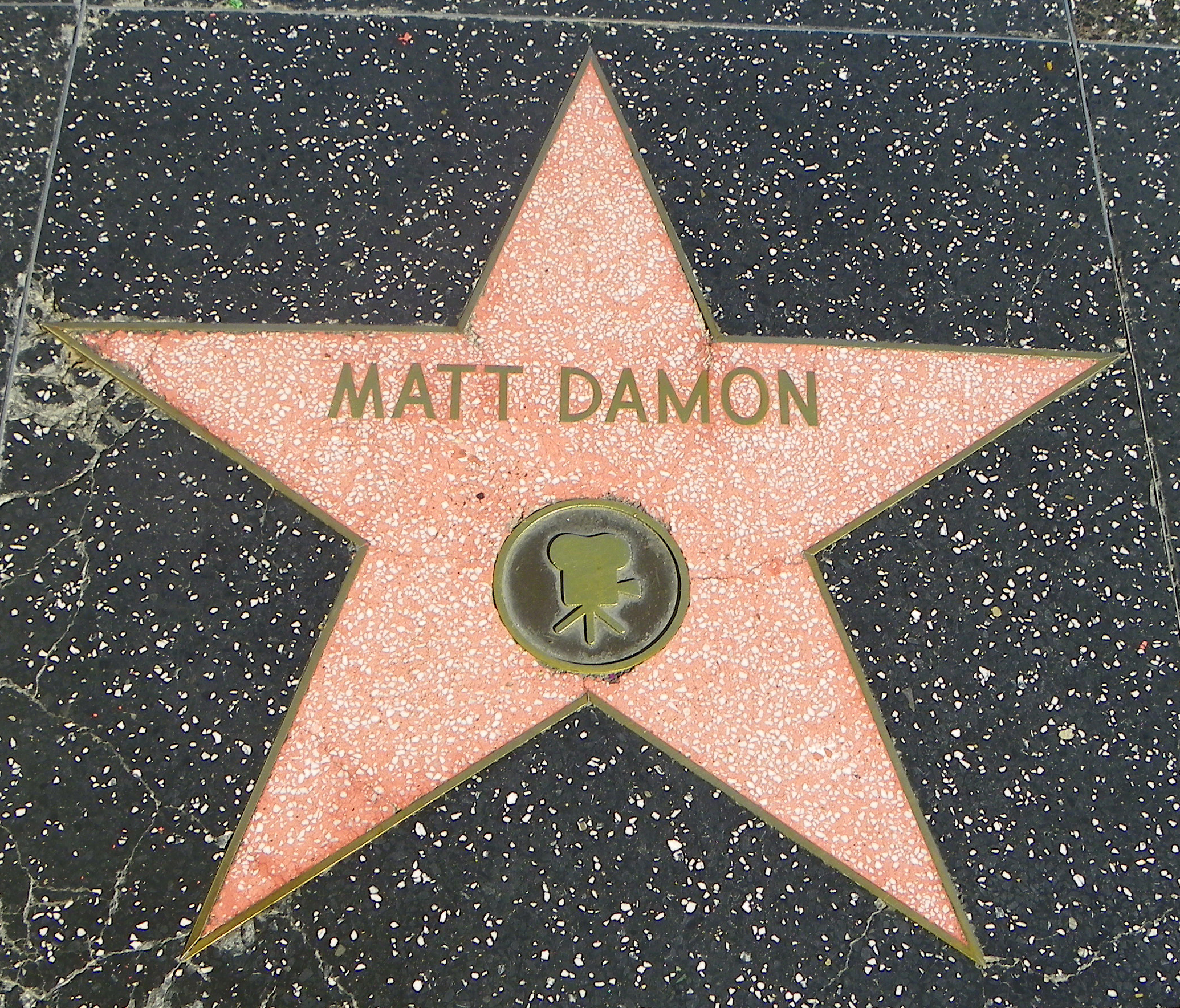
Matt Damon's star on the Hollywood Walk of Fame

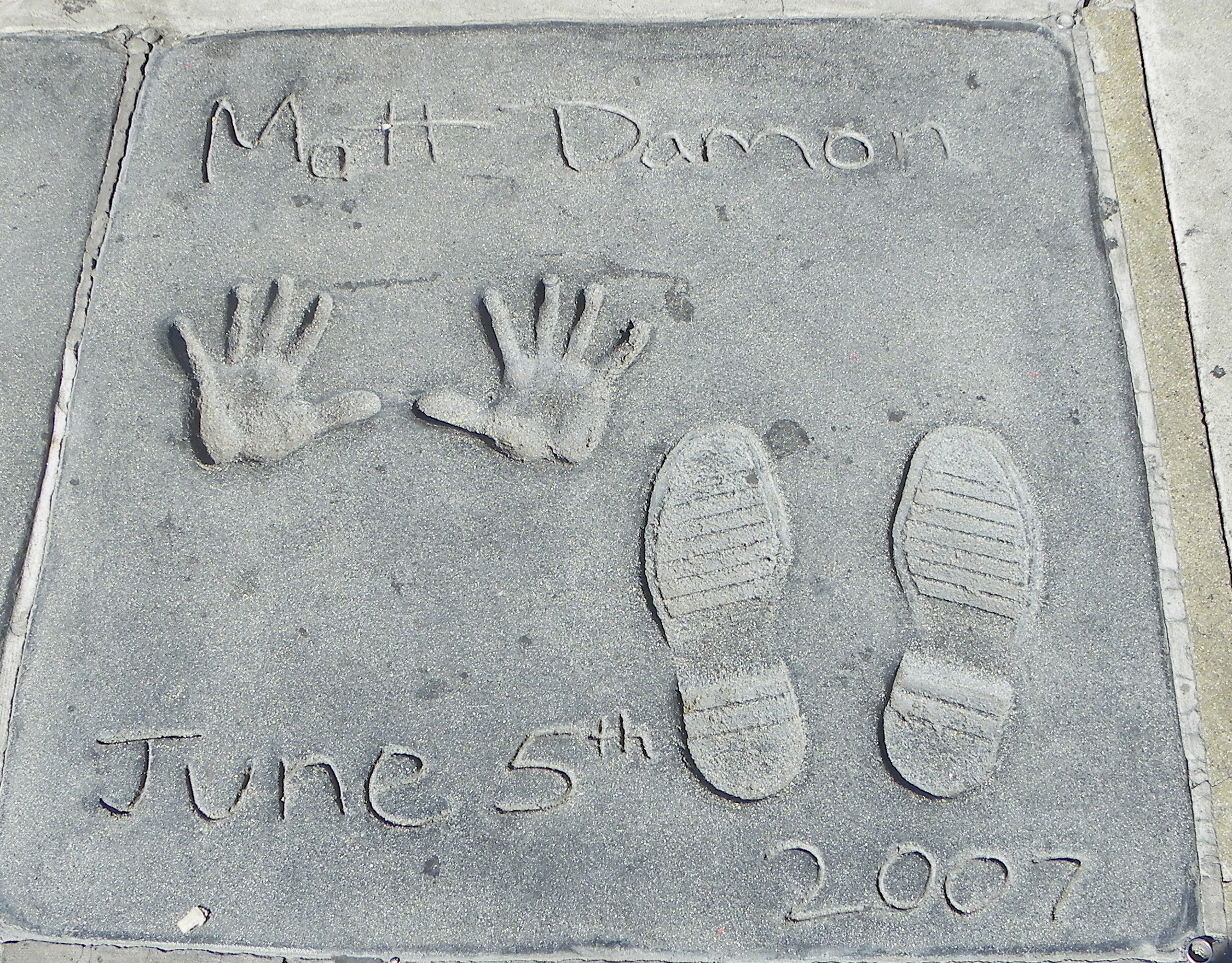
Handprints and footprints of Damon in front of the Grauman's Chinese Theatre

On June 3, 2016, Matt Damon served as commencement speaker at the Massachusetts Institute of Technology's 2016 commencement exercises. MIT President L. Rafael Reif noted that in The Martian, Damon's character Mark Watney declares himself a "space pirate": in parodic honor, Reif presented Damon with an honorary pirate's diploma, which is bestowed to select MIT students on completion of certain Physical Education requirements.

Organizations	Year	Award	Result	Ref.
Hollywood Walk of Fame	2007	Star on the Walk of Fame	Honored	
American Cinematheque Award	2010	Statue	Honored	
Brown University	2013	Honorary Doctor of Fine Arts (DFA) degree	Honored	
Britannia Award	2017	Stanley Kubrick Award	Honored	
Anthem Award	2024	Special Achievement Award	Honored	
