= Matt Damon filmography =

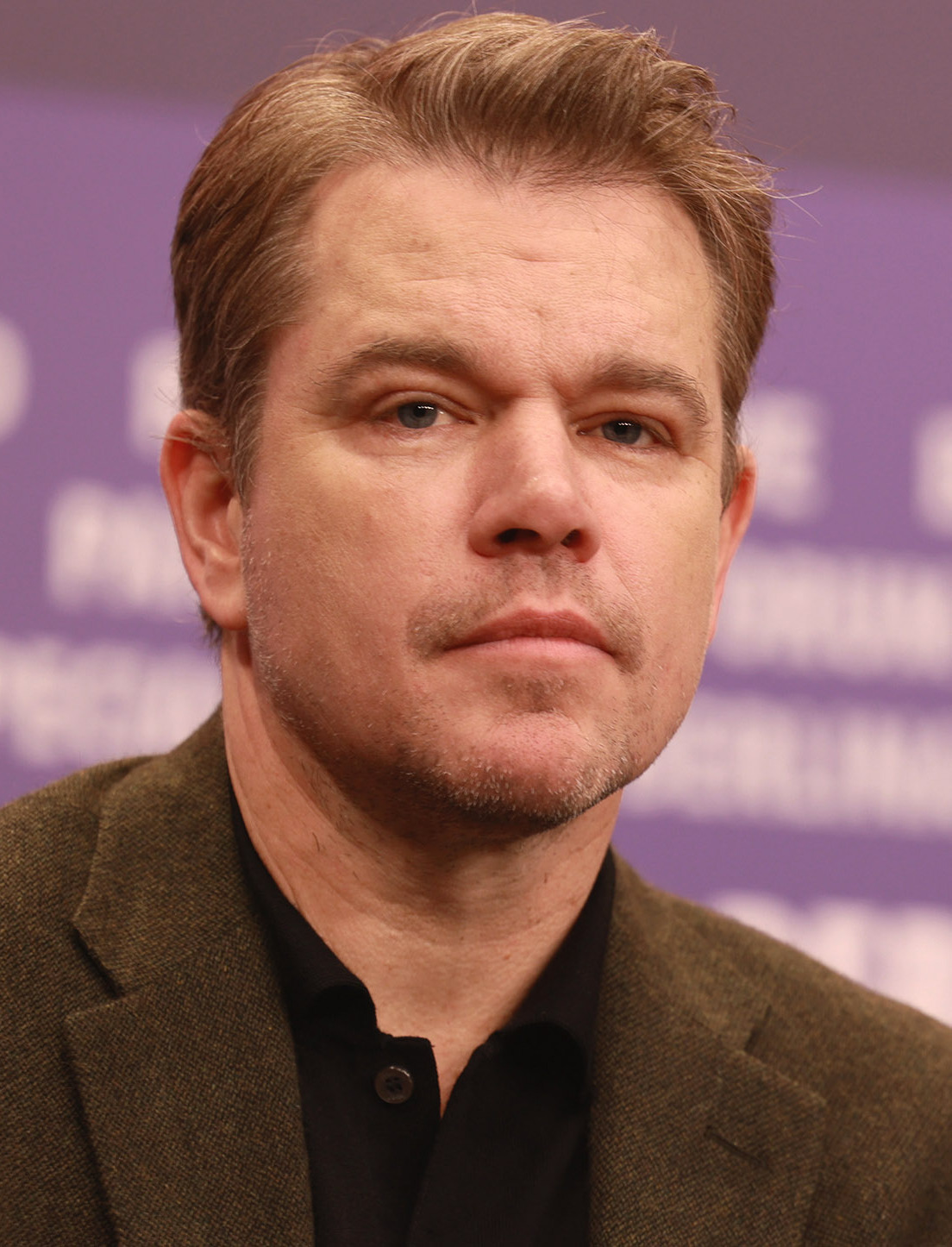
Damon at the 2023 Berlin International Film Festival

American actor Matt Damon made his film debut with a small role in Mystic Pizza (1988), after which he played several supporting roles. His first leading role was in the legal drama film The Rainmaker (1997). His breakthrough came later that year when he played the title role of an unrecognized genius in Good Will Hunting, which he also co-wrote with Ben Affleck. They won the Academy Award for Best Original Screenplay and Damon was nominated for Best Actor. He followed it by playing the title roles of a soldier in Steven Spielberg's war drama Saving Private Ryan (1998) and of the criminal Tom Ripley in the thriller The Talented Mr. Ripley (1999), both of which gained critical and commercial success. Damon and Sean Bailey worked on the television series Project Greenlight since 2000, helping newcomers make their first film.

Damon's profile continued to expand in the 2000s, as he took on starring roles in two lucrative film franchises. He played a con man in Steven Soderbergh's Ocean's Trilogy (2001–2007) and played the titular spy Jason Bourne in four films of the Bourne series (2002–2016). Damon played an energy analyst in the thriller film Syriana (2005) and starred in Martin Scorsese's acclaimed crime film The Departed (2006). He played the rugby player Francois Pienaar in the sports film Invictus (2009), gaining a nomination for the Academy Award for Best Supporting Actor. Damon continued to gain praise for his collaborations with Soderbergh on the crime film The Informant! (2009) and the drama Behind the Candelabra (2013). His portrayal of Scott Thorson in the latter earned him a Primetime Emmy Award nomination.

Damon's biggest commercial successes in the 2010s came with the western True Grit (2010), and the science fiction films Elysium (2013) and The Martian (2015). In the latter, which earned over $630 million to become his highest-grossing release, he played a botanist stranded on Mars, for which he received an Oscar nomination and won a Golden Globe Award for Best Actor. Interstellar (2014) earned over $670 million, with Damon in a minor role. Following a series of poorly received films, Damon had a success in the sports drama Ford v Ferrari (2019), in which he portrayed Carroll Shelby. He co-wrote, produced, and starred as Jean de Carrouges in the period drama The Last Duel (2021), which despite positive reviews was not financially profitable. In 2023, Damon portrayed Nike executive Sonny Vaccaro in Affleck's acclaimed sports drama Air. Damon appeared in back-to-back Christopher Nolan films, first in Oppenheimer (2023) as Leslie Groves and next in The Odyssey (2026) as the titular character Odysseus.

== Film ==
Key
†	Denotes films that have not yet been released

Table featuring feature films with Matt Damon
Year	Title	Role	Notes	Ref(s)
1988	Mystic Pizza	Steamer Windsor		
1988	The Good Mother	Extra		
1989	Field of Dreams	Extra	Uncredited	
1992	School Ties	Charlie Dillon		
1993	Geronimo: An American Legend	Lt. Britton Davis		
1995	Glory Daze	Edgar Pudwhacker		
1996	Courage Under Fire	Specialist Ilario		
1997	Chasing Amy	Shawn Oran		
1997	The Rainmaker	Rudy Baylor		
1997	Good Will Hunting	Will Hunting	Also screenwriter	
1998	Saving Private Ryan	Private James Francis Ryan		
1998	Rounders	Mike McDermott		
1999	Dogma	Loki		
1999	The Talented Mr. Ripley	Tom Ripley		
2000	Titan A.E.	Cale	Voice role	
2000	The Legend of Bagger Vance	Rannulph Junuh		
2000	Finding Forrester	Steven Sanderson	Cameo	
2000	All the Pretty Horses	John Grady Cole		
2001	Jay and Silent Bob Strike Back	Himself	Cameo	
2001	Ocean's Eleven	Linus Caldwell		
2001	The Majestic	Luke Trimble	Voice role	
2002	Gerry	Gerry	Also screenwriter and editor	
2002	Stolen Summer	—N/a	Producer only	
2002	Spirit: Stallion of the Cimarron	Spirit	Voice role	
2002	The Third Wheel	Kevin	Cameo; also executive producer	
2002	The Bourne Identity	Jason Bourne		
2002	Confessions of a Dangerous Mind	Bachelor Matt	Cameo	
2002	Speakeasy	—N/a	Executive producer only	
2003	The Battle of Shaker Heights	—N/a	Executive producer only	
2003	Stuck on You	Bob Tenor		
2004	EuroTrip	Donny	Cameo	
2004	Jersey Girl	PR Exec #2	Cameo	
2004	The Bourne Supremacy	Jason Bourne		
2004	Ocean's Twelve	Linus Caldwell		
2004	Howard Zinn: You Can't Be Neutral on a Moving Train	Narrator	Documentary	
2005	Magnificent Desolation: Walking on the Moon 3D	Alan Shepard	Documentary	
2005	The Brothers Grimm	Wilhelm Grimm		
2005	Syriana	Bryan Woodman		
2005	Feast	—N/a	Executive producer only	
2006	The Departed	Sergeant Colin Sullivan		
2006	The Good Shepherd	Edward Wilson		
2007	Ocean's Thirteen	Linus Caldwell		
2007	The Bourne Ultimatum	Jason Bourne		
2007	Youth Without Youth	Ted Jones	Uncredited	
2007	Running the Sahara	Narrator	Documentary; also executive producer	
2008	Che: Part Two	Father Schwarz		
2008	Ponyo	Kōichi	Voice role	
2009	The Informant!	Mark Whitacre		
2009	Invictus	Francois Pienaar		
2010	Teenage Paparazzo	Himself	Documentary	
2010	Green Zone	Roy Miller		
2010	Hereafter	George Lonegan		
2010	True Grit	LaBoeuf		
2010	Inside Job	Narrator	Documentary	
2011	The Adjustment Bureau	David Norris		
2011	Contagion	Mitch Emhoff		
2011	Margaret	Mr. Aaron		
2011	Happy Feet Two	Bill the Krill	Voice role	
2011	We Bought a Zoo	Benjamin Mee		
2012	Promised Land	Steve Butler	Also screenwriter and producer	
2012	Radioman	Himself	Documentary	
2013	Behind the Candelabra (Note: The film was made for television in the United States, but was given a theatrical release in other countries.)	Scott Thorson		
2013	Elysium	Max Da Costa		
2013	The Zero Theorem	Management		
2014	The Monuments Men	James Granger		
2014	The Man Who Saved the World	Himself	Documentary	
2014	Interstellar	Dr. Mann		
2015	The Martian	Mark Watney		
2016	Manchester by the Sea	—N/a	Producer only	
2016	Jason Bourne	Jason Bourne	Also producer	
2016	The Great Wall	William Garin		
2017	Bending the Arc	—N/a	Documentary; executive producer only	
2017	Downsizing	Paul Safranek		
2017	Suburbicon	Gardner Lodge		
2017	Thor: Ragnarok	Loki Actor	Uncredited cameo	
2018	Unsane	Detective Ferguson	Cameo	
2018	Deadpool 2	Redneck #1	Cameo; credited as "Dickie Greenleaf"	
2018	Ocean's 8	Linus Caldwell	Cameo in deleted scene	
2019	Ford v Ferrari	Carroll Shelby		
2019	Jay and Silent Bob Reboot	Loki	Cameo	
2021	No Sudden Move	Mike Lowen/Mr. Big	Uncredited cameo	
2021	Stillwater	Bill Baker		
2021	The Last Duel	Jean de Carrouges	Also screenwriter and producer	
2022	Thor: Love and Thunder	Loki Actor	Cameo	
2023	Air	Sonny Vaccaro	Also producer and writer: additional literary material (uncredited)	
2023	Oppenheimer	General Leslie Groves		
2024	Drive-Away Dolls	Senator Gary Channel	Cameo	
2024	IF	Sunny	Voice role	
2024	Small Things like These	—N/a	Producer only	
2024	The Instigators	Rory	Also producer	
2024	Unstoppable	—N/a	Executive producer only	
2025	Kiss of the Spider Woman	—N/a	Executive producer only	
2025	The Accountant 2	—N/a	Executive producer only	
2026	Influenced	Himself	Cameo	
2026	The Rip	Lt. Dane Dumars	Also producer	
2026	The Odyssey	Odysseus		
2026	Animals	—N/a	Producer only	
2027	Untitled Daniels film †		Filming	
TBA	Stuntnuts: The Movie †		Post-production	

== Television ==
Table featuring television programs with Matt Damon
Year	Title	Role	Notes	Ref(s)
1990	Rising Son	Charlie Robinson	Television film	
1995	The Good Old Boys	Cotton Calloway	Television film	
2001–2005, 2015	Project Greenlight	Himself	Executive producer	
2002	Push, Nevada	—N/a	Executive producer	
2002	The Bernie Mac Show	Himself	Episode: "Keep It on the Short Grass"	
2002	Will & Grace	Owen	Episode: "A Chorus Lie"	
2002, 2018, 2026	Saturday Night Live	Himself / host, Brett Kavanaugh	4 episodes	
2003–2014	Journey to Planet Earth	Narrator	Documentary; 9 episodes	
2006–present	Jimmy Kimmel Live!	Himself	Talk show; 26 episodes	
2007	Arthur	Himself (voice)	Episode: "The Making of Arthur/Dancing Fools"	
2009	Entourage	Himself	Episode: "Give a Little Bit"	
2009	The People Speak	Narrator	Documentary; executive producer	
2010	Cubed	Himself	Episode: "Welcome Matt Damon"	
2010–2011	30 Rock	Carol Burnett	4 episodes	
2013	House of Lies	Himself	Episode: "Damonschildren.org"	
2014	Years of Living Dangerously	Himself	Documentary; episode: "A Dangerous Future"	
2015	The Leisure Class	—N/a	Television movie; executive producer	
2016	The Runner	—N/a	Executive producer	
2016	Incorporated	—N/a	Executive producer	
2019–2022	City on a Hill	—N/a	Executive producer	
2024	We Were the Lucky Ones	—N/a	Executive producer	
2025	Who Wants to Be a Millionaire	Himself	Teamed up with Ken Jennings to win one million dollars for the charity Water.org.	
2026	The Gilded Age	Gentleman crossing the street (Cameo)	Episode: "Ring the Bells"	

== See also ==
- List of awards and nominations received by Matt Damon
