= Florida Film Critics Circle Awards 1997 =

Annual US film awards ceremony

2nd FFCC Awards

Best Film:
Titanic

The 2nd Florida Film Critics Circle Awards honoured the best in film for 1997.

== Winners ==
- Best Actor:
  - Robert Duvall - The Apostle
- Best Actress:
  - Helen Hunt - As Good as It Gets
- Best Cast:
  - Boogie Nights
- Best Cinematography:
  - L.A. Confidential - Dante Spinotti
- Best Director:
  - Curtis Hanson - L.A. Confidential
- Best Documentary Film:
  - Fast, Cheap & Out of Control
- Best Film:
  - Titanic
- Best Foreign Language Film:
  - Shall we dansu? (Shall We Dance?) • Japan
- Best Newcomer:
  - Ben Affleck and Matt Damon - Good Will Hunting
- Best Screenplay:
  - L.A. Confidential - Curtis Hanson and Brian Helgeland
- Best Supporting Actor:
  - Rupert Everett - My Best Friend's Wedding
- Best Supporting Actress:
  - Julianne Moore - Boogie Nights
