= American Cinematheque Award =

American award for film and television personnel

The American Cinematheque Award annually honors "an extraordinary artist in the entertainment industry who is fully engaged in his or her work and is committed to making a significant contribution to the art of the motion pictures". These are organised by American Cinematheque, an independent, non-profit cultural organization in Los Angeles dedicated exclusively to the public presentation of the moving image in all its forms.

== Recipients ==
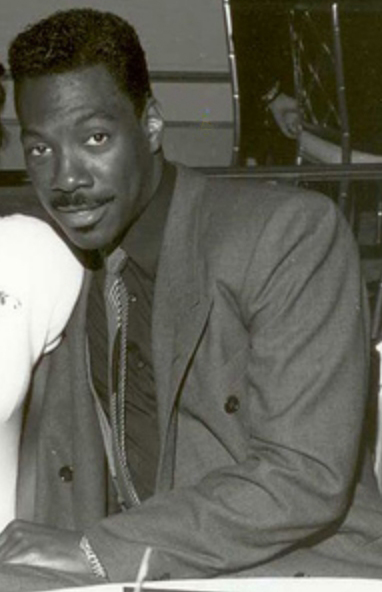
Eddie Murphy, the inaugural as well as the youngest recipient of the American Cinematheque Award.

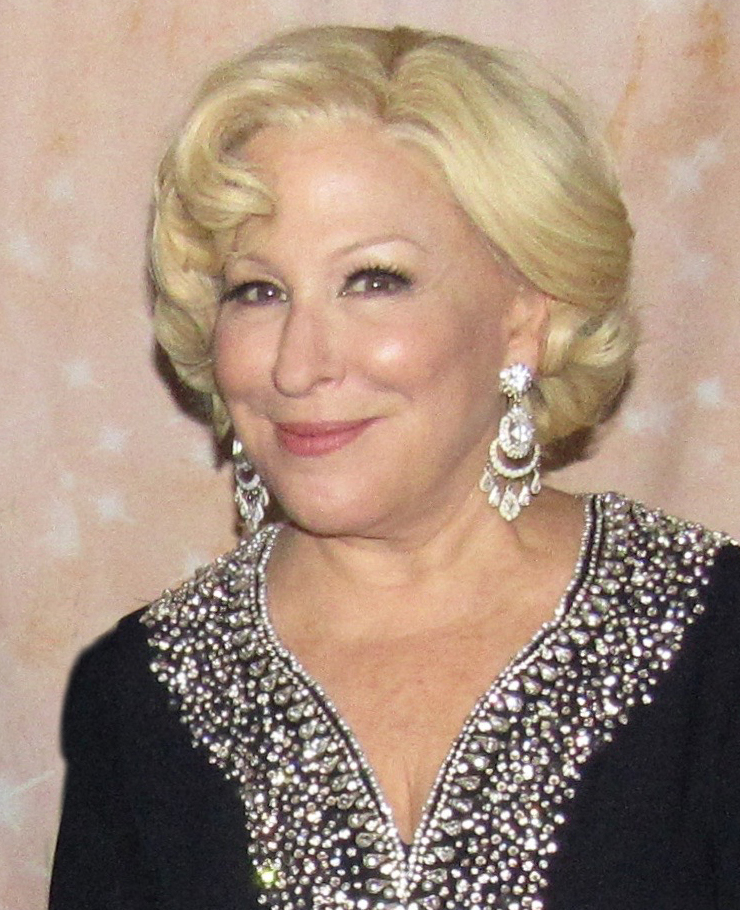
Bette Midler, the first female recipient of the American Cinematheque Award.

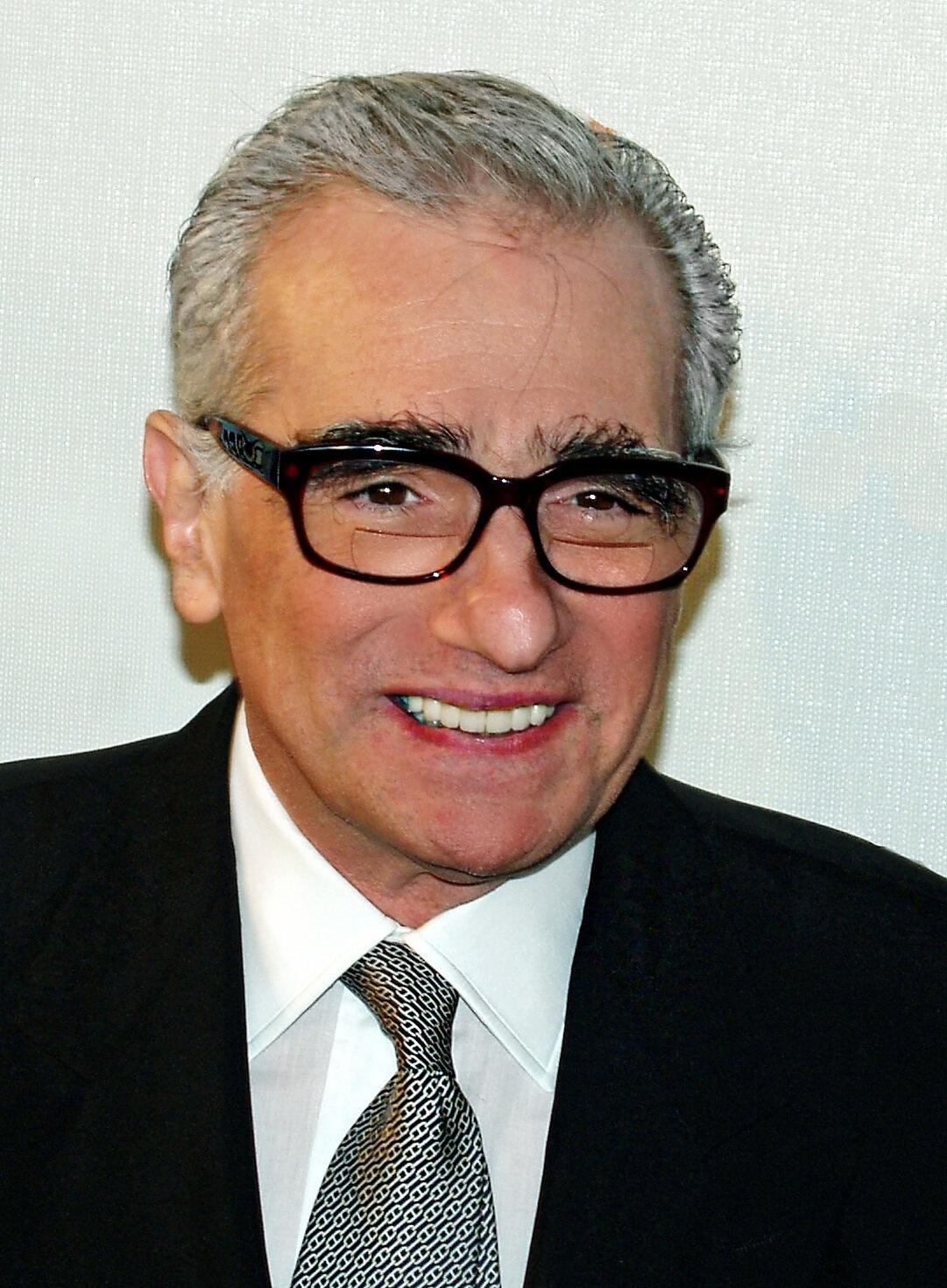
Martin Scorsese, was the 1991 recipient of the American Cinematheque Award.

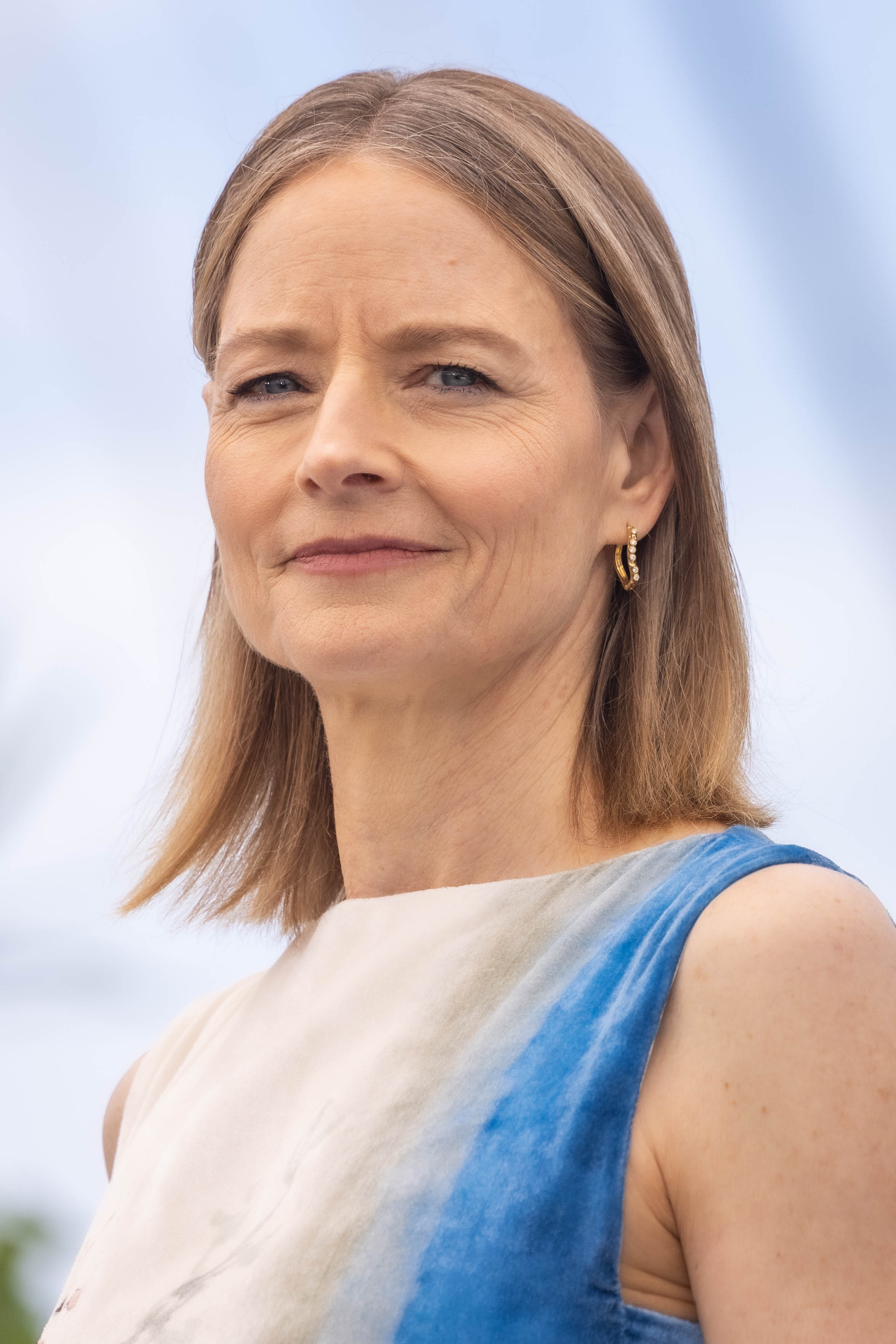
Jodie Foster, was the 1999 recipient of the American Cinematheque Award.

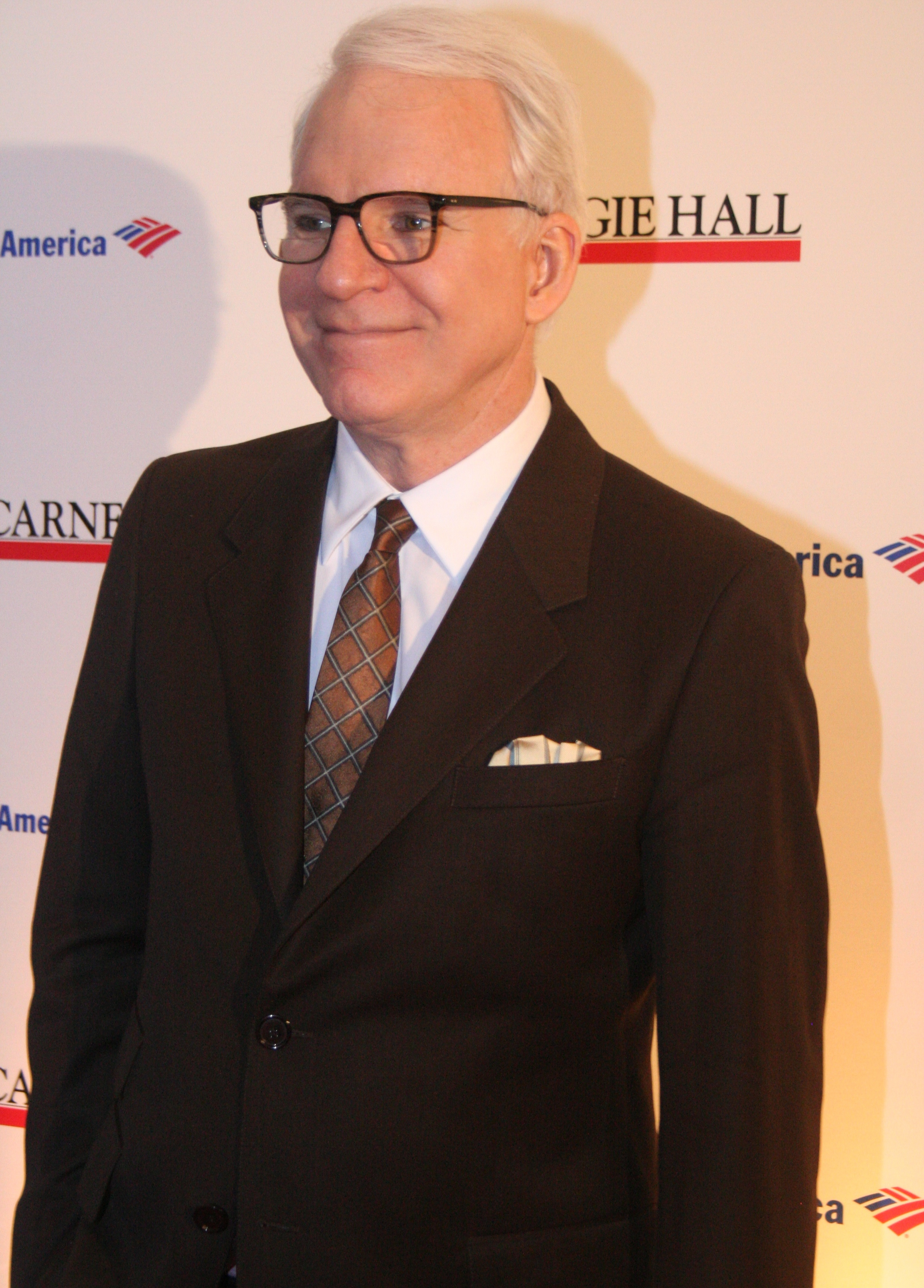
Steve Martin, was the 2004 recipient of the American Cinematheque Award.

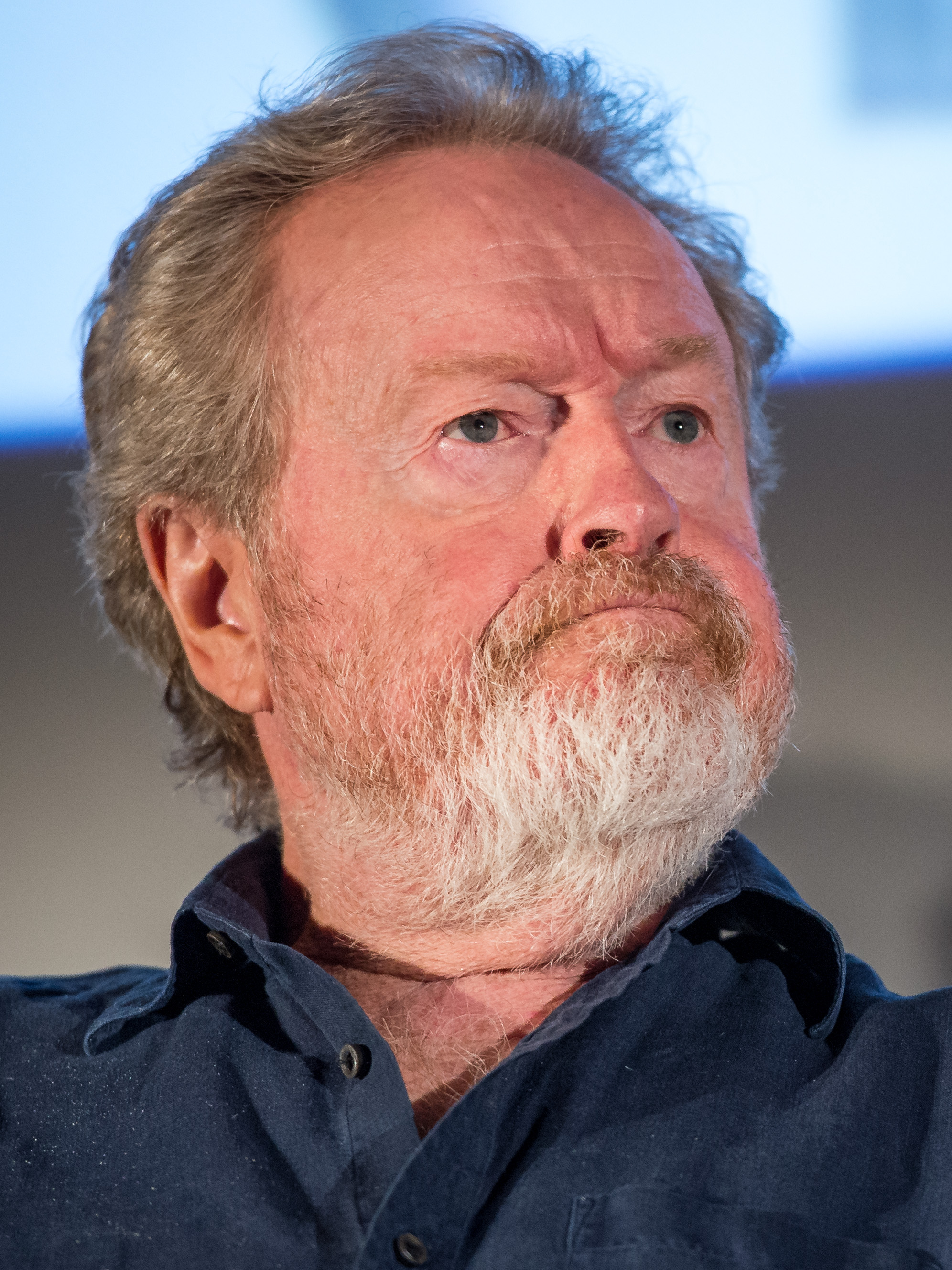
Ridley Scott, was the 2016 recipient of the American Cinematheque Award. He is also the oldest recipient of the honour.

| Recipient | Year | Age |
|---|---|---|
| Eddie Murphy | 1986 | 25 |
| Bette Midler | 1987 | 42 |
| Robin Williams | 1988 | 37 |
| Steven Spielberg | 1989 | 43 |
| Ron Howard | 1990 | 36 |
| Martin Scorsese | 1991 | 49 |
| Sean Connery | 1992 | 62 |
| Michael Douglas | 1993 | 49 |
| Rob Reiner | 1994 | 47 |
| Mel Gibson | 1995 | 39 |
| Tom Cruise | 1996 | 34 |
| John Travolta | 1997 | 43 |
| Arnold Schwarzenegger | 1998 | 51 |
| Jodie Foster | 1999 | 36 |
| Bruce Willis | 2000 | 45 |
| Nicolas Cage | 2001 | 37 |
| Denzel Washington | 2002 | 48 |
| Nicole Kidman | 2003 | 36 |
| Steve Martin | 2004 | 59 |
| Al Pacino | 2005 | 65 |
| George Clooney | 2006 | 45 |
| Julia Roberts | 2007 | 40 |
| Samuel L. Jackson | 2008 | 60 |
| Matt Damon | 2010 | 40 |
| Robert Downey Jr. | 2011 | 46 |
| Ben Stiller | 2012 | 47 |
| Jerry Bruckheimer | 2013 | 56 |
| Matthew McConaughey | 2014 | 45 |
| Reese Witherspoon | 2015 | 39 |
| Ridley Scott | 2016 | 79 |
| Amy Adams | 2017 | 43 |
| Bradley Cooper | 2018 | 43 |
| Charlize Theron | 2019 | 44 |
| Spike Lee | 2020 | 63 |
| Scarlett Johansson | 2021 | 37 |
| Ryan Reynolds | 2022 | 46 |
| Helen Mirren | 2023 | 78 |
| Jessica Chastain | 2024 | 47 |
| Michael B. Jordan | 2025 | 38 |

== Power of Cinema Award recipients ==
The American Cinematheque's Power of Cinema Award annually honors "an individual or organization whose actions have advanced the significance and social relevance of films in today's modern culture".

| Recipient | Year | Ref. |
|---|---|---|
| Participant Media | 2021 | |
| Jason Blum | 2022 | |
| Kevin Goetz and Screen Engine | 2023 | |
| Charles Roven | 2024 | |
| Charles Rivkin, Chairman and CEO of the Motion Picture Association | 2025 | |

== Sid Grauman Award awardees ==
The American Cinematheque's Sid Grauman Award annually honors "an individual who has made a significant contribution to the Hollywood film industry in the continuing advancement of theatrical exhibition".

| Recipient | Year | Ref. |
|---|---|---|
| Jeffrey Katzenberg | 2015 | |
| Sue Kroll | 2016 | |
| IMAX | 2017 | |
| Dolby Laboratories | 2018 | |
| AMC Theatres | 2019 | |
