= Matt Damon =

American actor (born 1970)

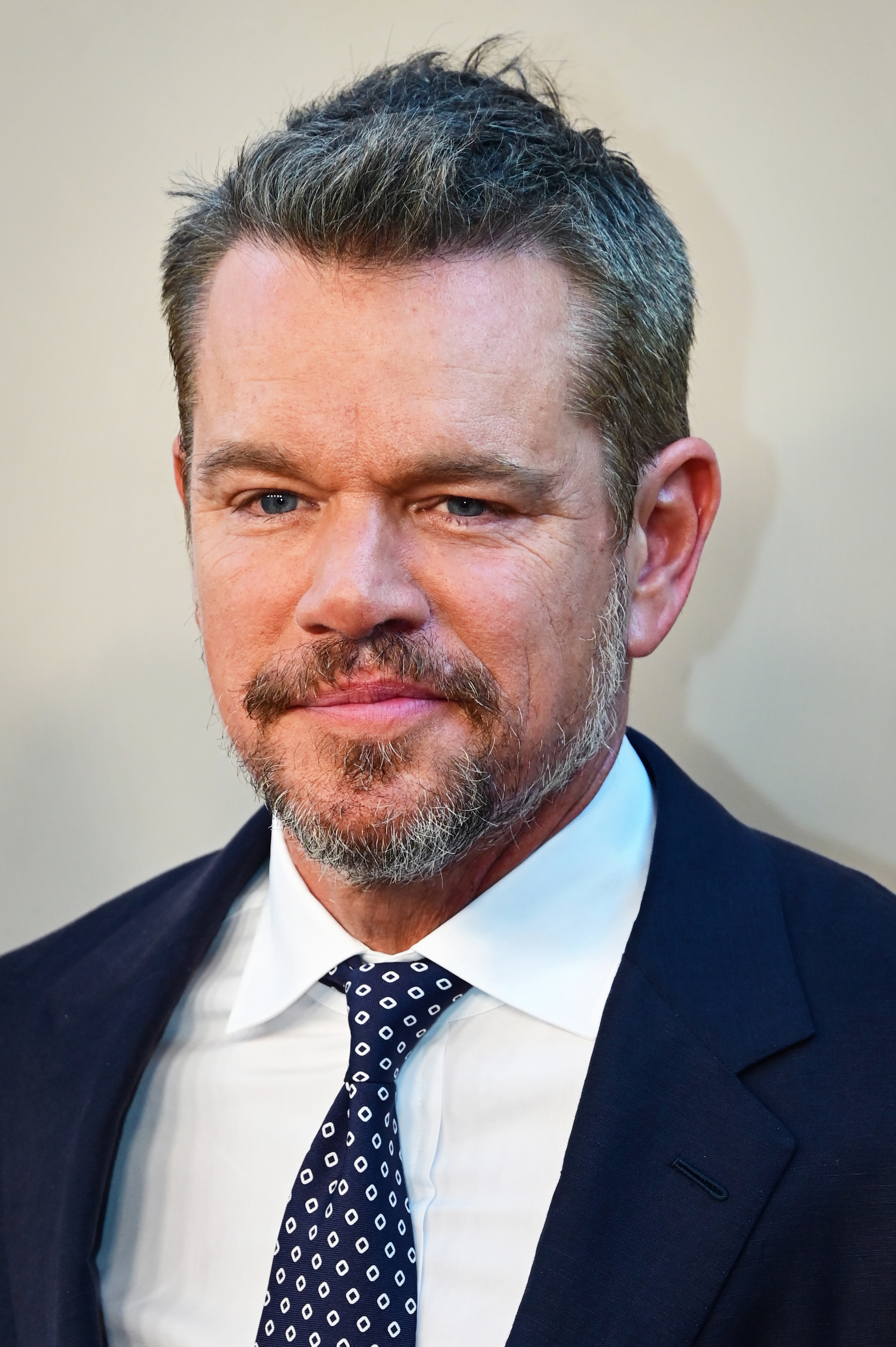
- Damon in 2026
- Born: Matthew Paige Damon; October 8, 1970 (age 56); Cambridge, Massachusetts, US
- Education: Harvard University
- Occupations: Actor; film producer; screenwriter
- Years active: 1987–present
- Works: Full list
- Spouse: Luciana Bozán Barroso (m. 2005)
- Children: 3
- Awards: Full list
- Matt Damon's voice From BBC Radio 4's The Film Programme, recorded August 17, 2007

Signature
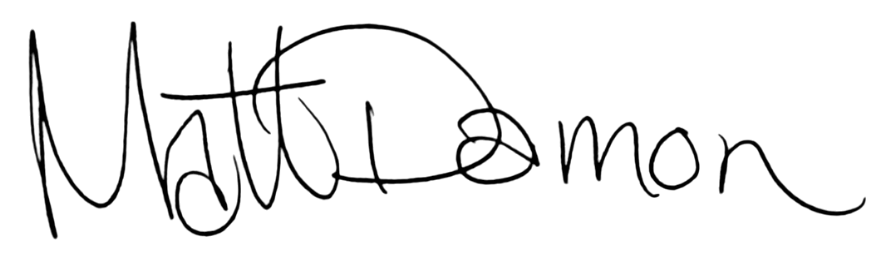

Matthew Paige Damon (/ˈdeɪmən/ DAY-mən; born October 8, 1970) is an American actor, film producer, and screenwriter. He was ranked among Forbes's most bankable stars in 2007, and in 2010 was one of the highest-grossing actors of all time. He has received various awards and nominations, including an Academy Award, an Actor Award, and two Golden Globe Awards, in addition to nominations for three British Academy Film Awards and seven Primetime Emmy Awards.

Damon made his acting debut in the film Mystic Pizza (1988) before gaining prominence in 1997 when he and Ben Affleck wrote and starred in Good Will Hunting, which won them the Academy Award for Best Original Screenplay and the Golden Globe Award for Best Screenplay. He further established himself as a leading man by starring as Tom Ripley in The Talented Mr. Ripley (1999), Jason Bourne in the Bourne franchise (2002–2007; 2016), and Linus Caldwell in the Ocean's trilogy (2001–2007). He received a nomination for the Academy Award for Best Supporting Actor for playing a rugby player in Invictus (2009) and received another nomination for the Academy Award for Best Actor and won the Golden Globe Award for Best Actor for playing an astronaut stranded on Mars in The Martian (2015). He also acted in The Rainmaker (1997), Saving Private Ryan (1998), Syriana (2005), The Departed (2006), The Informant! (2009), True Grit (2010), Contagion (2011), Interstellar (2014), Ford v Ferrari (2019), The Last Duel (2021), Air (2023), Oppenheimer (2023), and played the titular character in The Odyssey (2026).

On television, Damon portrayed Scott Thorson in the HBO biopic Behind the Candelabra (2013), for which he was nominated for a Primetime Emmy Award. He was Emmy-nominated for his guest role in 30 Rock in 2011 and for hosting Saturday Night Live in 2019. He also produced the reality series Project Greenlight (2001–2015) as well as the film Manchester by the Sea (2016). Damon has performed voiceover work in both animated and documentary films and established two production companies with Affleck, Artists Equity and the former Pearl Street Films. He has been involved in charitable work with organizations including the One Campaign, H2O Africa Foundation, Feeding America, and Water.org.

== Early life and education ==
Matthew Paige Damon was born in Cambridge, Massachusetts, on October 8, 1970, the second son of Kent Telfer Damon, a stockbroker, and Nancy Carlsson-Paige, an early childhood education professor at Lesley University. His father has English and Scottish ancestry, while his mother is of Finnish and Swedish descent; her family surname had been changed from Pajari to Paige. Damon and his family moved to Newton for two years, where he lived in a two-bedroom duplex next to the historian and author Howard Zinn. (Note: Matt Damon maintained a life-long relationship with his former neighbor historian and author Howard Zinn, whose biographical film You Can't Be Neutral on a Moving Train and audio version of A People's History of the United States Damon narrated.) His parents divorced when he was two years old, and he and his brother returned with their mother to Cambridge, where they lived in a six-family communal house. His brother, Kyle, is a sculptor and artist. Damon has said that, as a teenager, he felt lonely, as if he did not belong, and that his mother's by-the-book approach to child-rearing had made it hard for him to define his own identity.

Damon attended Cambridge Alternative School and Cambridge Rindge and Latin School, and was a good student. He acted in several high-school theater productions, and has credited his drama teacher, Gerry Speca, with having an important artistic influence on him, while noting wryly that Speca gave Ben Affleck (Damon's close friend and schoolmate) the "biggest roles and longest speeches".

He attended Harvard University as a member of the class of 1992, residing in Lowell House, but left before receiving his degree to take a lead role in the film Geronimo: An American Legend. While at Harvard, as an exercise for an English class, Damon wrote an essay in the form of a film treatment that was later developed into the screenplay Good Will Hunting (for which he received an Academy Award). Damon also took Gregory Nagy's course on the Ancient Greek Hero. While at Harvard, Damon took a drama/acting class and once did a scene with classmate and future Supreme Court justice Ketanji Brown Jackson. At Harvard, Damon was a member of the Delphic Club, one of the university's Final Clubs. In 2013, he was awarded the Harvard Arts Medal.

== Career ==
=== 1988–1999: Early work and breakthrough ===
Damon entered Harvard University in 1988, (Note: He lived in Matthews Hall and then Lowell House.) where he appeared in student theater plays, such as Burn This and A... My Name is Alice. Later, he made his film debut at the age of 18, with a single line of dialogue in the romantic comedy Mystic Pizza. As a student at Harvard, he acted in small roles such as in the TNT original film Rising Son and the ensemble prep-school drama School Ties. He left the school in 1992, a semester (12 credits) shy of completing his Bachelor of Arts in English to feature in Geronimo: An American Legend in Los Angeles, erroneously expecting the movie to be a big success. (Note: "By the time I figured out I had made the wrong decision, it was too late. I was living out here with a bunch of actors, and we were all scrambling to make ends meet," he has said.) Damon next appeared as an opiate-addicted soldier in 1996's Courage Under Fire, for which he lost 40 pounds (18 kg) in 100 days on a self-prescribed diet and fitness regimen. Courage Under Fire gained him critical notice; The Washington Post called his performance "impressive".

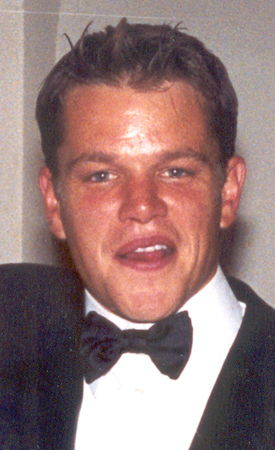
Damon during filming for The Talented Mr. Ripley in 1999

During the early 1990s, Damon and Affleck wrote Good Will Hunting (1997), a screenplay about a young mathematics genius and an extension of a screenplay Damon wrote as an assignment at Harvard, having integrated advice from director Rob Reiner, screenwriter William Goldman, and writer/director Kevin Smith. He asked Affleck to perform the scenes with him in front of the class and, when Damon later moved into Affleck's Los Angeles apartment, they began working on the script more seriously. The film, which they wrote mainly during improvisation sessions, was set partly in their hometown of Cambridge, and drew from their own experiences. They sold the screenplay to Castle Rock Entertainment in 1994, but after a conflict with the company, they convinced Miramax to purchase the script. The film received critical praise; Quentin Curtis of The Daily Telegraph found "real wit and vigour, and some depth" in their writing and Emanuel Levy of Variety wrote that Damon "gives a charismatic performance in a demanding role that's bound to catapult him to stardom. Perfectly cast, he makes the aching, step-by-step transformation of Will realistic and credible." It received nine Academy Awards nominations, including Best Actor for Damon; he and Affleck won the Oscar and Golden Globe Award for Best Screenplay. He and Affleck were each paid salaries of $600,000, while the film grossed over $225 million at the worldwide box office. The two later parodied their roles from the film in Kevin Smith's 2001 movie Jay and Silent Bob Strike Back.

Of his "overnight success" through Good Will Hunting, Damon said that by that time he had been working in the cinema for 11 years but still found the change "nearly indescribable—going from total obscurity to walking down a street in New York and having everybody turn and look". Before the film, Damon played the lead in the critically acclaimed drama The Rainmaker (1997), where he was recognized by the Los Angeles Times as "a talented young actor on the brink of stardom." For the role, Damon regained most of the weight he had lost for Courage Under Fire. After meeting Damon on the set of Good Will Hunting, director Steven Spielberg cast him in the brief title role in the 1998 World War II film Saving Private Ryan. He co-starred with Edward Norton in the 1998 poker film Rounders, playing a reformed gambler in law school who must return to playing high-stakes poker to help a friend pay off loan sharks. Despite meager earnings at the box office, it is considered one of the best poker movies of all time.

Damon then portrayed antihero Tom Ripley in The Talented Mr. Ripley (1999), a role for which he lost 11 kilograms (25 lb). Damon said he wanted to display his character's humanity and honesty on screen despite his criminal actions. An adaptation of Patricia Highsmith's 1955 novel of same name, the film co-starred Jude Law, Gwyneth Paltrow, and Cate Blanchett, and received praise from critics. "Damon outstandingly conveys his character's slide from innocent enthusiasm into cold calculation", according to Variety magazine. In Dogma (1999), Damon plays a fallen angel who discusses pop culture as intellectual subject matter with Affleck's character. The film received generally positive reviews, but proved controversial among religious groups who deemed it blasphemous.

=== 2000–2008: Worldwide recognition ===
In 2000, Damon, Affleck, and producers Chris Moore and Sean Bailey founded the production company LivePlanet to create the Emmy-nominated documentary series Project Greenlight, which aimed to find and fund worthwhile film projects by novice filmmakers. Among the company's projects was the short-lived mystery-hybrid series Push, Nevada.

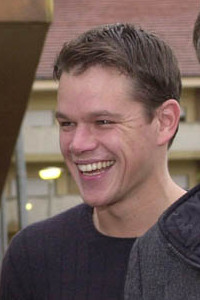
Damon in 2001

Damon's attempts at leading characters in romantic dramas such as 2000's All the Pretty Horses and The Legend of Bagger Vance were commercially and critically unsuccessful. Variety said of his work in All the Pretty Horses: "He just doesn't quite seem like a young man who's spent his life amidst the dust and dung of a Texas cattle ranch. Nor does he strike any sparks with [Penelope] Cruz." He was similarly deemed "uncomfortable being the center" of Robert Redford's The Legend of Bagger Vance by Peter Rainer of New York magazine.

During this period, Damon joined two lucrative film series—Ocean's Trilogy (2001–2007) and Bourne (2002–2016)—and produced the television series Project Greenlight (2001–2005, 2015). He co-starred as thief Linus Caldwell in the former's first installment, Steven Soderbergh's 2001 ensemble film Ocean's Eleven, a remake of the Rat Pack's Ocean's 11 (1960). The role was originally meant for Mark Wahlberg, who declined it in favor of other projects. The film grossed $450 million on a budget of $83 million. Damon, alongside Affleck and others, produced the documentary series Project Greenlight, aired on HBO and later Bravo, which helped newcomers develop their first film. The series was nominated for the Primetime Emmy Award for Outstanding Reality Program in 2002, 2004, and 2005. Damon later said that he and Affleck felt proud that the show helped launch the careers of several directors; Damon later served as the executive producer of a number of projects directed by the winners of the show.

In 2002, Damon began writing and starring in Gerry, a drama about two friends who forget to bring water and food when they go hiking in a desert. The film's reviews were generally favorable, but it was a box-office failure. He then played amnesiac assassin Jason Bourne in Doug Liman's action thriller The Bourne Identity (2002). Liman considered several actors for the role before he cast Damon. Damon insisted on performing many of the stunts himself, undergoing three months of extensive training in stunt work, the use of weapons, boxing, and eskrima. He said that before The Bourne Identity he was jobless for six months, and many of his films during that period underperformed at the box office. He doubted the film's financial prospects, but it proved a commercial success. The film's reviews were also good; Roger Ebert praised it for its ability to absorb the viewer in its "spycraft" and "Damon's ability to be focused and sincere". For his role, Entertainment Weekly named Damon among "the decade's best mixer of brawn and brains."

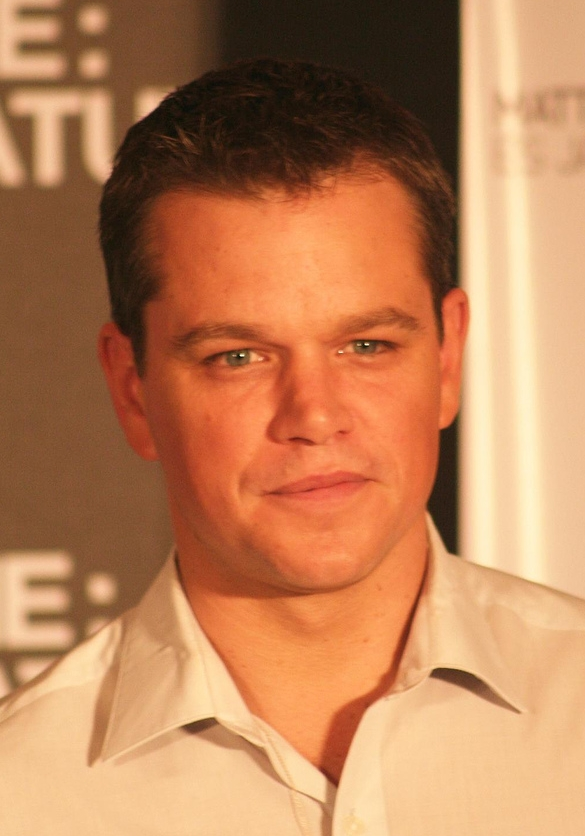
Damon attending an event for The Bourne Ultimatum in 2007

Damon voiced the role of Spirit in the animated film Spirit: Stallion of the Cimarron (2002) and later played a conjoined twin in Stuck on You (2003), which received a mixed critical reception. His major releases in 2004 included starring roles in the sequels The Bourne Supremacy and Ocean's Twelve. Both films earned more than $280 million at the box office. BBC's Nev Pierce called The Bourne Supremacy "a brisk, engrossing and intelligent thriller", adding, "Damon is one hell of an action hero. He does a lot with very little, imbuing his limited dialogue with both rage and sorrow, looking harder and more haunted as the picture progresses". For the film, he earned an Empire Award for Best Actor; Empire attributed Damon's win to his "astute, underplayed performance, through which he totally eschews movie star vanity". He played a fictionalized version of Wilhelm Grimm alongside Heath Ledger in Terry Gilliam's fantasy adventure The Brothers Grimm (2005), a critically panned commercial failure; The Washington Post wrote, "Damon, constantly flashing his newscaster's teeth and flaunting a fake, 'Masterpiece Theatre' dialect, comes across like someone who got lost on the way to an audition for a high school production of The Pirates of Penzance."

Later in 2005, he appeared as an energy analyst in the geopolitical thriller Syriana alongside George Clooney and Jeffrey Wright. The film focuses on petroleum politics and the global influence of the oil industry. Damon says starring in the film broadened his understanding of the oil industry and that he hoped people would talk about the film. Peter Travers of Rolling Stone was mainly impressed with Clooney's acting, but also found Damon's performance "whiplash". In 2006, Damon joined Robert De Niro in The Good Shepherd as a career CIA agent, and played an undercover mobster working for the Massachusetts State Police in Martin Scorsese's The Departed, a remake of the Hong Kong police thriller Infernal Affairs. Assessing his work in the two films, Manohla Dargis of The New York Times wrote that Damon has the unique "ability to recede into a film while also being fully present, a recessed intensity, that distinguishes how he holds the screen." The Departed received critical acclaim and won the Academy Award for Best Picture. (Note: Box Office Mojo ranked it seventh among his films.)

According to Forbes in August 2007, Damon was the most bankable star of the actors reviewed. His last three films at that time averaged $29 at the box office for every dollar he earned. Two of his major releases in 2007 were the films Ocean's Thirteen and The Bourne Ultimatum, the third installments of their respective series. Both films earned more than $300 million at the box office. Damon had an uncredited cameo in Francis Ford Coppola's Youth Without Youth (2007) and another in the 2008 Che Guevara biopic Che. While working on the Bourne films, Damon declined an offer from James Cameron to star in his upcoming film Avatar, as he did not want to break his Bourne contract. Cameron offered Damon 10% of the profits for the film, which went on to become the most successful of all time. Damon said later: "I will go down in history... you will never meet an actor who turned down more money."

=== 2009–2019: Established actor ===
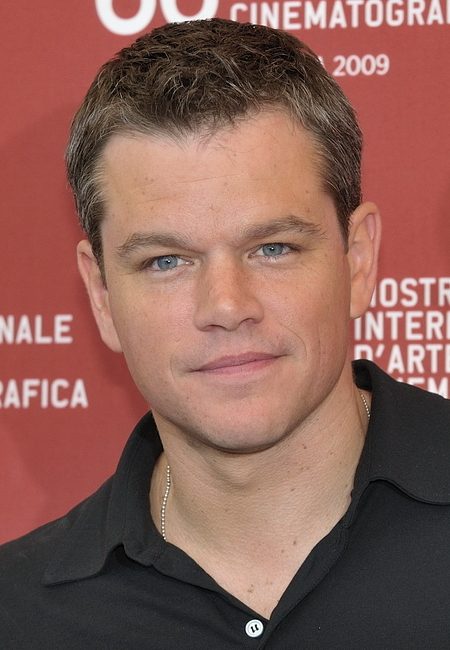
Damon attending an event for The Informant! at the 2009 Venice International Film Festival

He made a guest appearance in 2009 on the sixth-season finale of Entourage as himself, where he tries to pressure Vincent Chase (Adrian Grenier) into donating to his real foundation ONEXONE. His next role was Steven Soderbergh's dark comedy The Informant! (2009), of his Golden Globe-nominated work in which Entertainment Weekly wrote: "The star—who has quietly and steadily turned into a great Everyman actor—is in nimble control as he reveals his character's deep crazies." Also in 2009, Damon portrayed South Africa national rugby union team captain François Pienaar in the Clint Eastwood-directed film Invictus, based on the 2008 John Carlin book Playing the Enemy: Nelson Mandela and the Game That Changed a Nation and featuring Morgan Freeman as Nelson Mandela. Invictus earned Damon an Academy Award nomination for Best Supporting Actor. The New Republic observed that he brought "it off with low-key charm and integrity." Damon also lent his voice to the English version of the animated film Ponyo, released in the United States in August 2009.

In March 2010, Damon and Affleck collaborated again to create another production company, Pearl Street Films, a Warner Bros.-based production company. That year, he reunited with director Paul Greengrass, who directed him in the Bourne Supremacy and Bourne Ultimatum, for the action thriller Green Zone, which flopped commercially and received a score of 53% on Rotten Tomatoes and ambivalent critical reception. He appeared as a guest star in an episode of Arthur, titled "The Making of Arthur", as himself. During season 5 of 30 Rock, he appeared as a guest star in the role of Liz Lemon's boyfriend in the episodes "I Do Do", "The Fabian Strategy", "Live Show", and "Double-Edged Sword". Damon's 2010 projects included Clint Eastwood's Hereafter and the Coen brothers' remake of the 1969 John Wayne-starring Western True Grit. He also narrated Inside Job, a documentary film about the effects of financial deregulation in the 2008 financial crisis.

In 2010, he was one of the highest-grossing actors of all time, ranking 37th. In 2011, he starred in The Adjustment Bureau, Contagion, and We Bought a Zoo. That same year, the documentary he narrated, American Teacher, opened in New York before national screening. Also in 2011, he voiced a krill named Bill in the animated film Happy Feet Two. In 2012, Damon signed a multiyear deal to be the voice of TD Ameritrade advertisements, replacing Sam Waterston as the discount brokerage's spokesman. He donated all fees from the ads to charity. In 2012, Damon filmed Promised Land, directed by Gus Van Sant, which Damon co-wrote with John Krasinski. Damon's next film with Soderbergh was Behind the Candelabra, a drama about the life of pianist/entertainer Liberace (played by Michael Douglas), with Damon playing Liberace's longtime partner Scott Thorson. The film premiered on HBO on May 26, 2013.

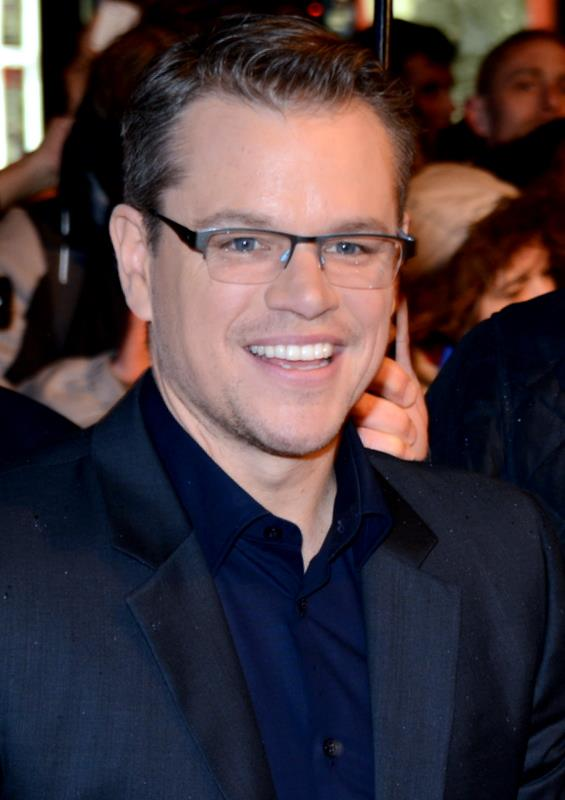
Damon at the French premiere of The Monuments Men in 2014

Damon starred in the science fiction film Elysium (2013), playing car-thief-turned-factory-worker Max DeCosta. He also appeared in the science fiction movie The Zero Theorem in 2013, directed by Terry Gilliam. That same year, Damon appeared in a 20-second advertisement for Nespresso, directed by Grant Heslov, with whom he worked on The Monuments Men. The deal earned him $3 million. Damon also provided voiceover for United Airlines' resurrected "Fly the Friendly Skies" ad campaign in 2013. In 2014, he starred in George Clooney's The Monuments Men, and played the minor role of scientist Dr. Mann in Christopher Nolan's Interstellar. That same year, Damon appeared as a celebrity correspondent for Years of Living Dangerously.

In 2015, Damon had the lead role, astronaut Mark Watney, in Ridley Scott's The Martian, based on Andy Weir's bestselling novel of the same name, a role that earned him the Golden Globe Award for Best Actor – Motion Picture Musical or Comedy and his second Academy Award nomination for Best Actor. Having not returned for the fourth film in the Bourne film series, Damon reprised his role in 2016's Jason Bourne, reuniting with Paul Greengrass. In 2017, Damon played the lead role in Zhang Yimou's The Great Wall, a hit internationally and a disappointment at the domestic box office. The film, and Damon's casting, were not well received by critics. Later in 2017, he starred in two satires, George Clooney's 1950s-set Suburbicon, released in October, and Alexander Payne's comedy Downsizing, released in December. In September 2018, he portrayed jurist Brett Kavanaugh on the late night sketch series Saturday Night Live. In 2019, Damon portrayed Carroll Shelby in the action biographical drama Ford v Ferrari, directed by James Mangold.

=== 2021–present: Continued positive critical reception ===
As of 2021, the films in which he had appeared had collectively earned over $3.88 billion at the North American box office. In 2021, Damon starred in Tom McCarthy's crime drama Stillwater, playing an unemployed oil rig worker from Oklahoma who sets out with a French woman to prove his convicted daughter's innocence. The film premiered at the 2021 Cannes Film Festival. IndieWire called Damon's performance "graced with a quiet softness that offsets the sheer volume of the character he's playing". That same year saw the release of the historical drama The Last Duel, which he starred in and co-wrote alongside Ben Affleck. The film, set in medieval France and based on the book of the same name, focuses on the true story of a knight, Jean de Carrouges, portrayed by Damon, who challenges his former friend to a judicial duel after he's accused of raping his wife. It premiered at the 78th Venice International Film Festival and was favorably reviewed but a financial failure.

In 2023, Damon starred as Nike executive Sonny Vaccaro in Air, a drama film about the launch of Air Jordan, co-starring and directed by Affleck. It marked the first release from Affleck and Damon's independent production company, Artists Equity, which they formed in 2022. Damon received praise for the role, earning a nomination for a Golden Globe Award. He also reunited with Christopher Nolan in the biographical film Oppenheimer, playing Leslie Groves, the director of the Manhattan Project. The film was a critical and commercial success, becoming Damon's highest-grossing movie.

In 2024, Damon starred in and produced The Instigators, alongside Casey Affleck, for Apple TV+.

Damon worked with Nolan once again on the 2026 film The Odyssey, portraying Odysseus, the Greek king of Ithaca. Of working on the film, Damon went on to declare it to be "the pinnacle of my entire career, I loved every minute of it ... it was such an ambitious project that the amount of work that needed to be done - there was no time for anything else. I've never ever done a movie that just required every single person to work - to kind of give maximum effort ... every location on that movie would've been the hardest location on any other movie I've ever done and any day of work would've harder on any other day - on any other movie I've ever done."

== Activism ==
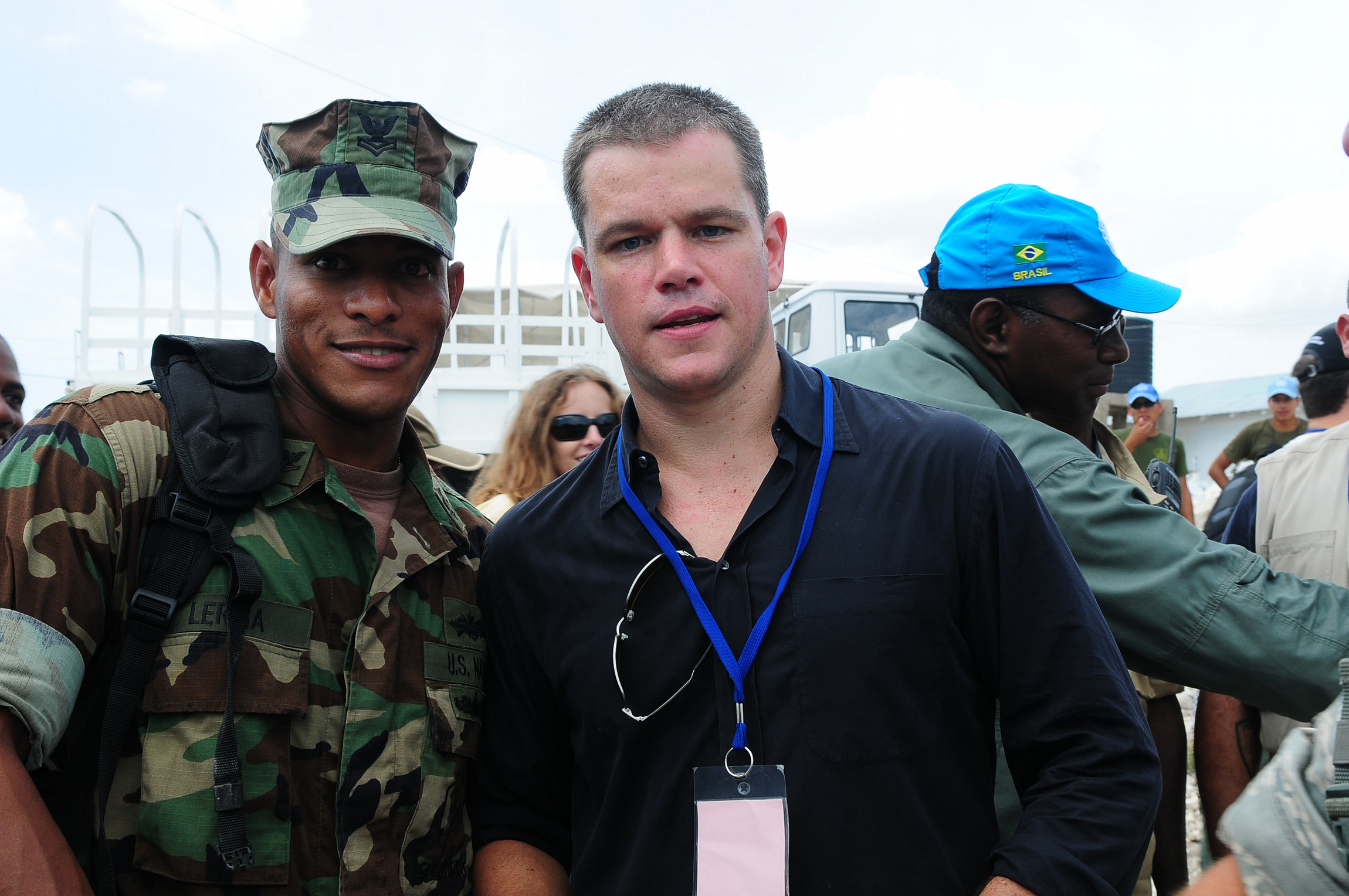
Damon with the United Nations Stabilization Mission in Haiti in 2008

With George Clooney, Brad Pitt, Don Cheadle, David Pressman, and Jerry Weintraub, Damon is one of the founders of Not On Our Watch Project, an organization that focuses global attention and resources to stop and prevent mass atrocities such as in Darfur. Damon supports One Campaign, which is aimed at fighting AIDS and poverty in Third World countries. He has appeared in its print and television advertising. He is an ambassador for ONEXONE, a nonprofit foundation committed to supporting, preserving, and improving the lives of children at home in Canada, the United States, and around the world.

Damon is a spokesperson for Feeding America, a hunger-relief organization, and a member of its Entertainment Council, participating in its Ad Council public service announcements. He was a board member of Tonic Mailstopper (formerly GreenDimes). This company attempted to halt the delivery of junk mail to American homes. (Note: Appearing on The Oprah Winfrey Show on April 20, 2007, Damon promoted the organization's efforts to prevent the trees used for junk mail letters and envelopes from being chopped down. Damon stated: "For an estimated dime a day they can stop 70% of the junk mail that comes to your house. It's very simple, easy to do, great gift to give, I've actually signed up my entire family. It was a gift given to me this past holiday season and I was so impressed that I'm now on the board of the company.") Damon founded the H2O Africa Foundation, the charitable arm of the Running the Sahara expedition, which merged with WaterPartners to create Water.org in 2009. Water.org has partnered with corporate sponsors to promote awareness and raise funds to support its mission of bringing safe, clean, cost-effective drinking water and sanitation to developing countries. In this context, Damon has been the face of advertising campaigns to promote Water.org in conjunction with products from major sponsors.

In 2011, Water.org received an $8 million grant from the PepsiCo Foundation to scale up WaterCredit, which provides microloans to families in India. Damon has promoted those efforts, tying in with Aquafina and Ethos Water bottled water, owned by PepsiCo and Starbucks. Since 2015, Damon has promoted Anheuser-Busch InBev's Stella Artois beer as a Water.org partner, including the sale of limited-edition "blue chalice" glasses imprinted with an embellished blue version of the brand's logo. In a commercial made for broadcast during the 2018 Super Bowl of the United States' National Football League (NFL), he promoted Water.org and Stella Artois's role in supporting its work. On July 30, 2025, Damon competed alongside game show host Ken Jennings in an episode of Who Wants to Be a Millionaire hosted by Jimmy Kimmel, winning $1 million for Water.org, thus becoming not only the third celebrities to win the top prize, but the sixteenth overall contestants to do so.

In October 2021, he announced a new partnership with the cryptocurrency trading platform Crypto.com, under which Crypto.com was to make a $1 million donation to Water.org. In the announcement, Damon said, "Crypto.com gave us this great donation, which is amazing. The money that I make for the commercials to promote them, I give 100% of that to Water.org as well. So, it's millions of dollars coming in to us." Damon's Crypto.com commercial started rolling out in cinemas late in 2021, and then on television in January 2022, mainly during sports programming such as NFL games. Once it was broadcast widely on television, it sparked much criticism, as did its accompanying "making of" featurette. In The Independent, Nathan Place wrote, "Twitter is cringing after a TV commercial starring Matt Damon compared trading cryptocurrency to mankind's greatest achievements. In the ad, which aired during Sunday night's NFL games, Mr Damon makes an abstract plug for crypto.com – a platform for exchanging digital currencies like Bitcoin – while striding past images of explorers and astronauts." In The New Zealand Herald, Lexie Cartwright summed up viewer reaction: "Matt Damon's new commercial plugging cryptocurrency has been absolutely savaged on social media, with viewers dubbing it 'insulting' and 'disgusting'." Cartwright included a series of tweets, among them one by Carole Cadwalladr of The Observer that read, "There isn't enough yuck in the world to describe Matt Damon advertising a Ponzi scheme and comparing it to the moon landings." Jody Rosen of the New York Times wrote, "There is something unseemly, to put it mildly, about the famous and fabulously wealthy urging crypto on their fans" and "The bleakness of that pitch is startling."

== Public image ==
Comedian Jimmy Kimmel has a running gag on his ABC television show, Jimmy Kimmel Live!, where he apologized for not being able to interview Damon at the end of each show. It culminated in a planned skit on September 12, 2006, when Damon stormed off after having his interview cut short. Damon and Kimmel have since continued their feud for over twenty years, mostly involving Damon attempting increasingly desperate measures to guest on the show, while Kimmel would go to elaborate lengths to keep Damon from appearing as a guest. The two have continued their feud in character even in public appearances outside the show, despite privately having a close friendship. The feud has since been heavily covered in media with each successive appearance from Damon. One such incident was on January 24, 2013, where Damon took over his show after "kidnapping" Kimmel for having been bumped from years of shows. It involved celebrities who were previously involved in the "feud", including Robin Williams, Ben Affleck, and Sarah Silverman. Damon's antics on the program appeared in several of E! Entertainment's top ten Jimmy Kimmel Live! spoofs. (Note: On January 31, 2008, Kimmel aired a clip of his then girlfriend, comedian Sarah Silverman, singing a song entitled "I'm Fucking Matt Damon" in which Damon appeared. Kimmel responded on February 24, 2008, with his music video which said that he was "fucking Ben Affleck". It featured Affleck along with several other actors. Another encounter, titled "The Handsome Men's Club", featured Kimmel, along with handsome actors and musicians. At the end of the skit, Kimmel had a door slammed in his face by Damon, who said that they had run out of time, followed by a sinister laugh.)

== Personal life ==
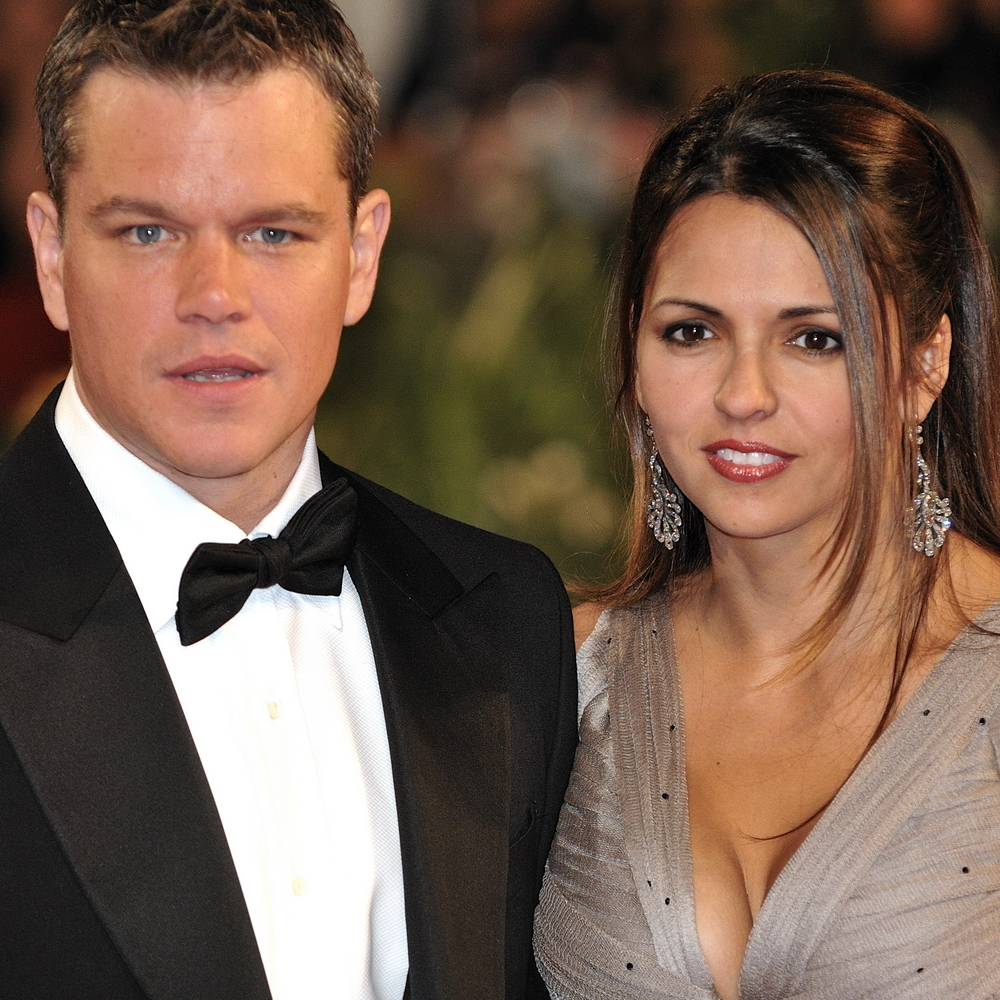
Damon with his wife Luciana Barroso at the 2009 Venice International Film Festival

Damon met his wife, Argentine bartender Luciana Barroso (née Bozán), while filming Stuck on You in Miami in April 2003. They became engaged in September 2005 and married in a private civil ceremony at the Manhattan Marriage Bureau on December 9, 2005. They have three daughters together: Isabella, born in 2006, Gia, born in 2008, and Stella, born in 2010. Connie Simpson served as their nanny.

The couple has lived in Miami and New York City. In 2018, the Damons bought a luxury penthouse in Brooklyn Heights for $16.5 million.

He is a fan of the Boston Red Sox. After the team won the 2007 World Series, he narrated the commemorative DVD release of the event. He has competed in several World Series of Poker (WSOP) events, including the 2010 World Series of Poker main event. He was eliminated from the 1998 WSOP by poker professional Doyle Brunson.

=== Political and social views ===
While discussing the Iraq War on Hardball with Chris Matthews in December 2006, Damon expressed concern about inequities across socioeconomic classes with regard to who is tasked with the responsibility of fighting wars.

In an interview with the Sunday Herald in January 2003, Damon expressed his support for gun control with "I actually hate guns. They freak me out."

Damon is a supporter of the Democratic Party and has made several critical attacks on Republican Party figures. He also expressed disappointment over the policies of President Barack Obama. He had a working relationship with the Obama administration, primarily due to his friendship with Jason Furman, his former Harvard roommate who became Chairman of the Council of Economic Advisors to Obama. In 2012, Damon joined Affleck and John Krasinski in hosting a fundraiser for Democratic Senate nominee Elizabeth Warren. Damon endorsed Hillary Clinton in the 2016 presidential election.

In October and December 2017, Damon made headlines when he made a series of comments about the Me Too movement against sexual harassment and misconduct. On October 10, Sharon Waxman, a former reporter for The New York Times, mentioned that Damon and Russell Crowe had made direct phone calls to her to vouch for the head of Miramax Italy, Fabrizio Lombardo. In her report, she suspected Lombardo of facilitating incidents of Harvey Weinstein's sexual misconduct in Europe. Damon later clarified that the calls were solely to reassure her of Lombardo's professional qualifications in the film industry. Waxman endorsed Damon's statement on Twitter hours later. Also during this time, Damon said he had heard a story from Affleck that Gwyneth Paltrow, a co-worker on a feature film of his, had been harassed by Weinstein in 1996, but thought "she had handled it" because they continued to work together, and Weinstein "treated her incredibly respectfully".

In another series of interviews in December 2017, Damon advocated a "spectrum of behavior" analysis of sexual misconduct cases, noting that some are more serious than others. The comment offended prominent members of the Me Too movement and the public for being "tone-deaf in understand[ing] what abuse is like". On January 17, 2018, Damon apologized on The Today Show for his social commentary, saying he "should get in the back seat and close my mouth for a while".

In March 2018, Damon and Affleck announced they would adopt the inclusion rider agreement in all future production deals with Pearl Street Films.

In August 2021, Damon sparked controversy after saying in an interview with The Sunday Times that he had only "months ago" stopped using the word "fag", saying that it "was commonly used when I was a kid, with a different application". This came after an incident in which his daughter left the table due to his use of the word and "wrote a very long, beautiful treatise on how that word is dangerous". He denied ever using the word "faggot" in his personal life, and of the word "fag": "I explained that that word was used constantly and casually and was even a line of dialogue in a movie of mine as recently as 2003.... To my admiration and pride, she was extremely articulate about the extent to which that word would have been painful to someone in the LGBTQ+ community regardless of how culturally normalized it was. I not only agreed with her but thrilled at her passion, values and desire for social justice."

== Awards and honors ==
Aside from awards he has garnered for his role as an actor and producer, Damon became the 2,343rd person to receive a star on the Hollywood Walk of Fame on July 25, 2007. He reacted to the award by stating: "A few times in my life, I've had these experiences that are just kind of too big to process and this looks like it's going to be one of those times."

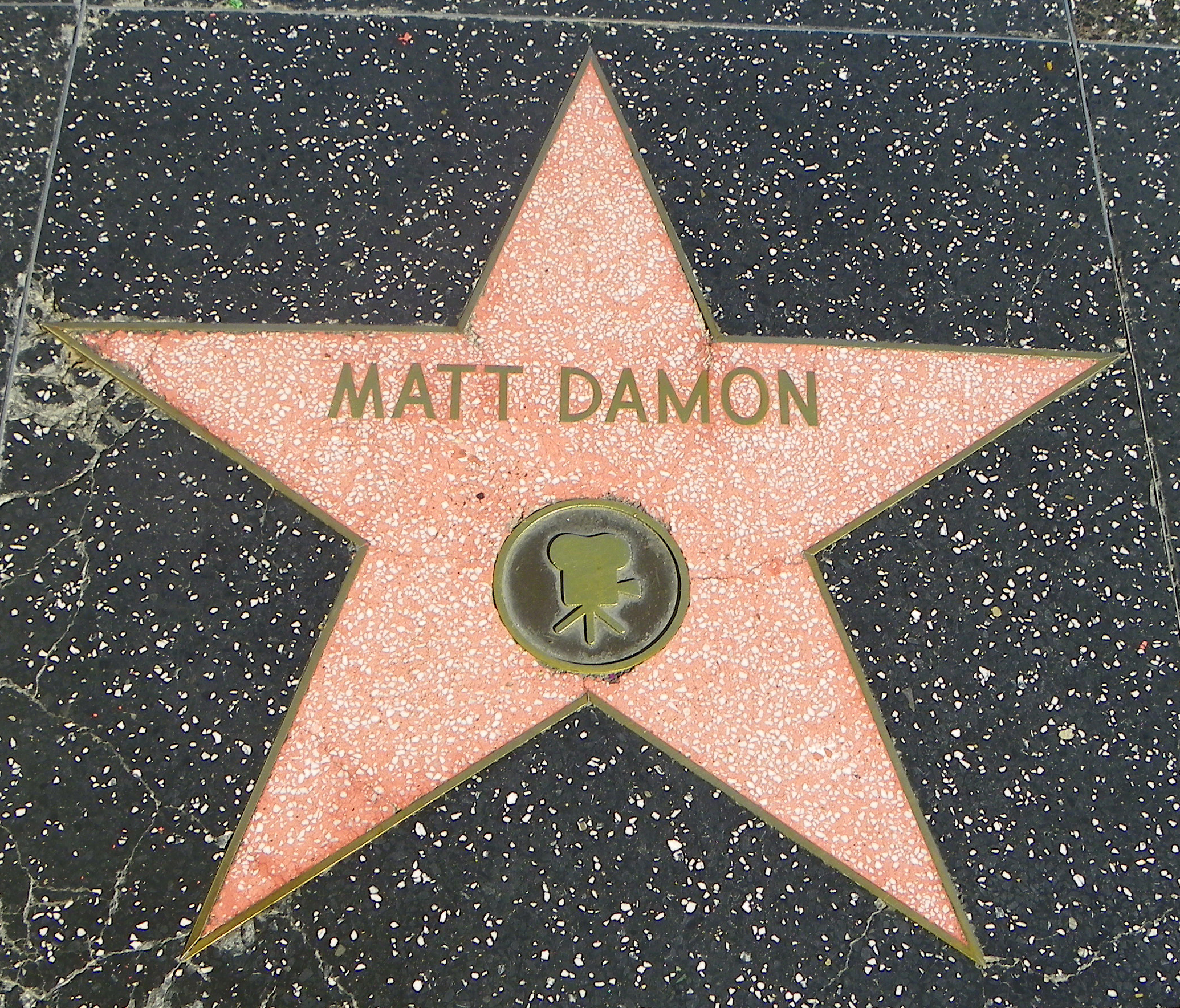
Matt Damon's star on the Hollywood Walk of Fame

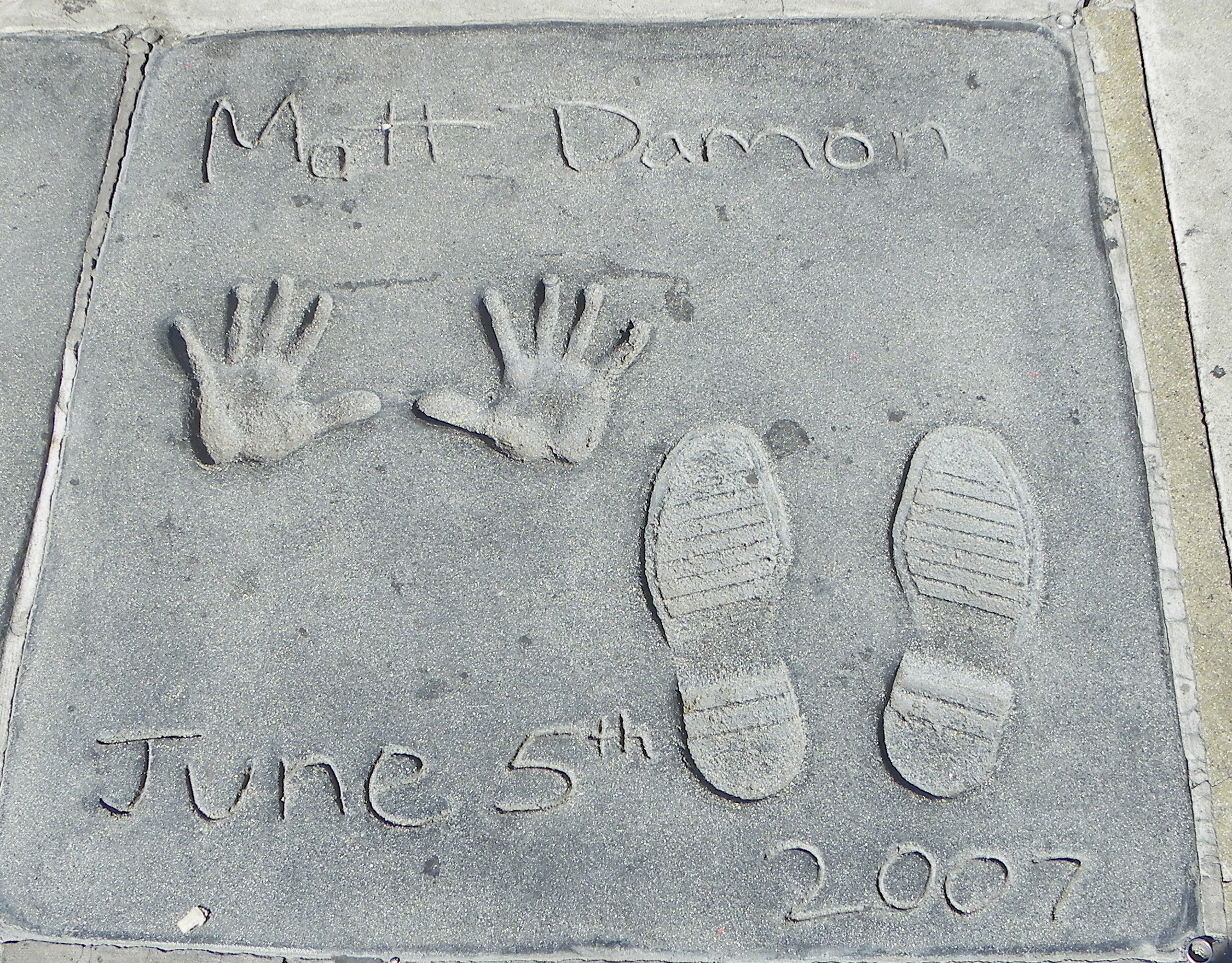
Handprints and footprints of Damon in front of the Grauman's Chinese Theatre
