= Kevin Goetz =

American entertainment researcher and entrepreneur

- Born: United States
- Years active: Entertainment researcher, entrepreneur, producer
- Website: screenengineasi.com

Kevin Goetz is an American entertainment researcher, entrepreneur, and producer who founded the entertainment research firm, Screen Engine.

== Early life and education ==
Goetz grew up in East Brunswick, New Jersey. He graduated from Rutgers University in 1984 with a Bachelor of Fine Arts in theater acting from the Mason Gross School of the Arts.

== Career ==
Goetz began his career at the National Research Group (NRG), a market research firm which later became part of the Nielsen Company. He then worked at OTX, a consumer market research firm, where he became president of its motion picture group.

In 2010, Goetz founded Screen Engine, offering screening research and audience analysis for film projects. The company later merged with ASI Entertainment in 2014 becoming Screen Engine/ASI, expanding into television, gaming, and digitally delivered content. In 2018, a private equity firm, The Wicks Group, acquired a 50% stake in Screen Engine. The firm further expanded through several acquisitions including ticktBox in 2019, Tapestry Research in 2021, and Coherency in 2023.

Goetz produced the film Wild Iris (2001), a Showtime production starring Laura Linney and Gena Rowlands. He is the author of Audience•ology: How Moviegoers Shape the Films We Love, co-written with Darlene Hayman and published by Simon & Schuster in 2021. His second book, How to Score in Hollywood, co-written with Bob Levin, is due to be released in November 2025. Goetz hosts the podcast "Don't Kill the Messenger," which features interviews with filmmakers and entertainment industry figures.

== Recognition ==
In 2001, the Los Angeles Times Magazine included him among the 100 most powerful and influential people in Southern California. In February 2024, Goetz received the Power of Cinema Award from the American Cinematheque. He is a member of the Academy of Motion Picture Arts and Sciences, the Television Academy, and the Producers Guild of America.

== Personal life ==
Goetz lives in Beverly Hills, California.
