= Pajari =

Pajari is a Finnish surname. Notable people with the name include:

- Aaro Pajari (1897–1949), Finnish military officer
- Antti Pajari (b. 1932), Finnish speedway rider
- Matti Pajari (b. 1979), Finnish racing cyclist
- Olli Pajari (1860–1923), Finnish schoolteacher and politician
- Sami Pajari (b. 2001), Finnish racing driver
